= Neustadt District, West Prussia =

The Neustadt district was a Prussian district that existed from 1818 to 1920. It was in the part of West Prussia that fell to Poland after World War I through the Treaty of Versailles. From 1939 to 1945 the district was re-established in occupied Poland as part of the Reichsgau Danzig-West Prussia. Today the area of the former district is in the Polish Pomeranian Voivodeship.

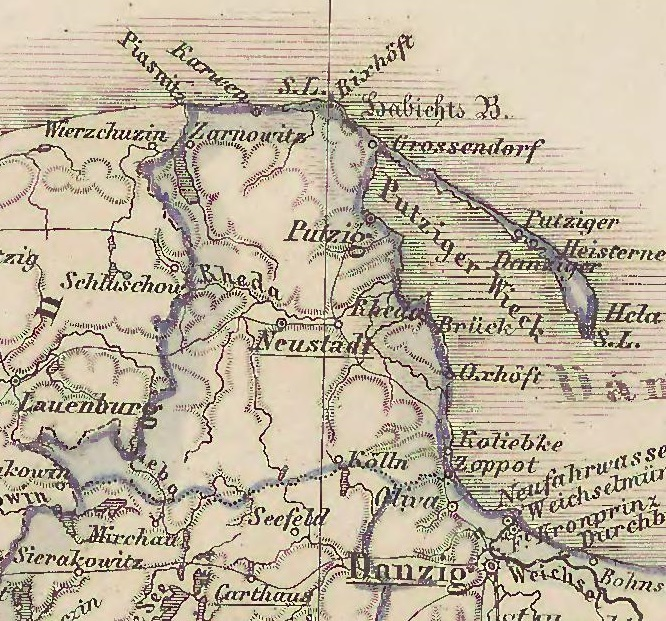
Kreis Neustadt (1818-1887)

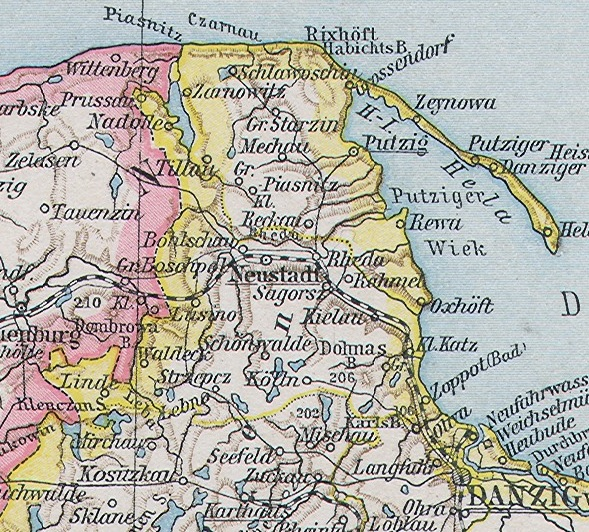
Kreis Neustadt (1887-1920)

Province of West Prussia (1913) Regierungsbezirk Danzig Regierungsbezirk Marienwerder

== History ==
With the First Partition of Poland, the district became part of the Kingdom of Prussia in 1772 and initially belonged to the Dirschau district in the province of West Prussia. In the course of the Prussian administrative reforms, on April 30, 1815, the area became part of the Danzig administrative region in the province of West Prussia. As part of a comprehensive district reform in the Danzig region, the new district of Neustadt was formed on April 1, 1818 from the northern part of the Dirschau district. It included the urban centers of Neustadt, Hela and Putzig. The district office was established in Neustadt.

From December 3, 1829 to April 1, 1878, West Prussia and East Prussia were united to form the Province of Prussia, which had belonged to the German Reich since January 1871. Due to the continuous growth of the population in the 19th century, some districts in West Prussia turned out to be too large and a downsizing appeared to be necessary. On October 1, 1887, the new Putzig district with the district office in the town of Putzig was formed from the northern part of the Neustadt district. The rural community of Zoppot received the town charter on April 1, 1902.

After World War I, due to the provisions of the Versailles Treaty, almost the entire Neustadt district had to be ceded by the German Reich on January 10, 1920. Most of the district was assigned to Poland. The city of Zoppot became part of the Free City of Danzig. A strip of territory west of Lake Żarnowiec with the municipality of Kniewenbruch remained in Germany and became part of the Lauenburg district in the Province of Pomerania.

In the Second Polish Republic, the city of Neustadt was renamed Wejherowo, after its founder Jakub Wejher. As a result of emigration, the German population in the area shrank considerably after 1920.

== Demographics ==
Ethnolinguistic structure of the Neustadt district
Year	Population	German		Polish / Kashubian / Bilingual / Other	
1890	41,660	18,365	44.1%	23,295	55.9%
1900	49,043	22,660	46.2%	26,383	53.8%
1905	55,587	27,048	48.7%	28,539	51.3%
1910	61,620	30,932	50.2%	30,688	49.8%

== Elections ==
In the German Empire, the districts of Neustadt, Karthaus and Putzig formed the Reichstag constituency of Danzig 4. This constituency was won by candidates from the Polish Party in all elections between 1871 and 1912.

== Municipalities ==
In 1910, the Neustadt district comprised two cities and 55 rural communities:

- Bendargau
- Bieschkowitz
- Bohlschau
- Bojahn
- Ciessau
- Czechotzin
- Damerkau
- Dohnasberg
- Espenkrug
- Gdingen
- Glashütte
- Gnewau
- Gossentin
- Gowin
- Grabowitz
- Groß Katz
- Grünberg
- Jellenschehütte
- Kantrschin
- Kielau
- Klutschau
- Kniewenbruch
- Kolletzkau
- Kölln
- Kowalewo
- Lebno
- Lensitz
- Linde
- Lusin
- Mellwin
- Miloschewo
- Nadolle
- Neustadt, city
- Poblotz
- Pretoschin
- Quaschin
- Rahmel
- Reschke
- Rheda
- Robbakau
- Sagorsch
- Sbichau
- Schönwalde
- Seelau
- Soppieschin
- Spechtswalde
- Steinkrug
- Strebielin
- Strepsch
- Ustarbau
- Vitzlin
- Wahlendorf
- Warschkau
- Werder
- Worle
- Zemblau
- Zoppot, city

The city of Zoppot became part of the Free City of Danzig in 1920 and the municipality of Kniewenbruch remained in Germany. All other municipalities were transferred to Poland in 1920.

== Landkreis Neustadt in occupied Poland (1939–1945) ==
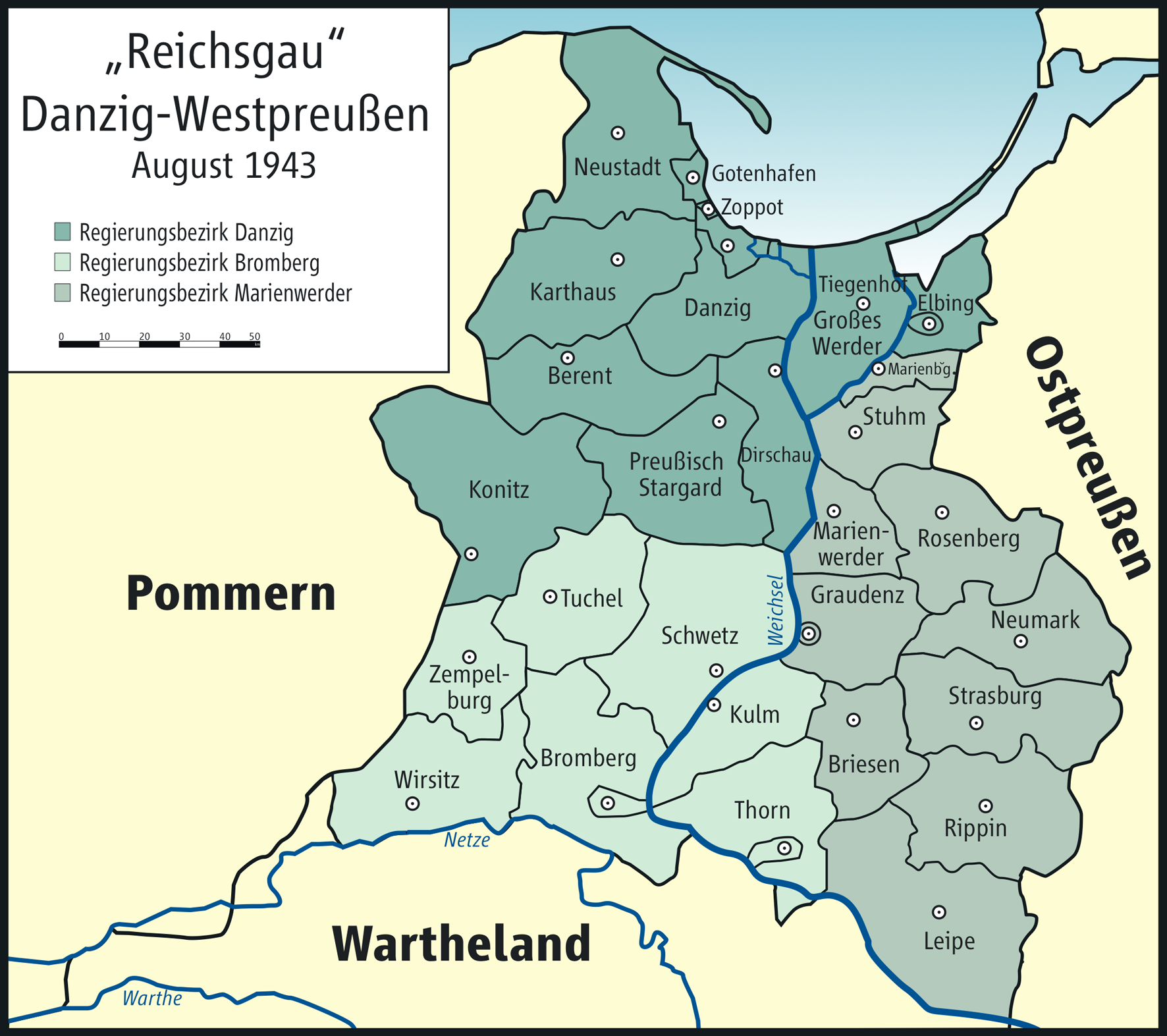
Reichsgau Danzig-West Prussia

=== History ===
After the invasion of Poland by Nazi Germany, the territories of the former districts of Neustadt and Putzig were annexed and added to the newly formed Reichsgau West Prussia, later renamed Reichsgau Danzig-West Prussia.

In the spring of 1945, the district was occupied by the Red Army and was restored to Poland. Germans who settled in the district during the occupation, as well as native members of the German minority in Poland either fled or were expelled.

=== Place names ===
In some cases, place names were considered "not German" enough and were given a phonetic alignment, were translated or replaced by newly created names, for example:

- Bojahn: Blücherode
- Ceynowa: Ziegenhagen
- Darslub: Buchheide
- Gohra: first Bergen, then Rhedaberg
- Goschin: Kaiserhof
- Kolletzkau: Kollendorf
- Polzin: Konradswiese
- Quaschin: Quassendorf
- Slawoschin: first Wittenbrock, then Wittenbrook

== Notable people ==
- Florian Ceynowa (1817–1881), Kashubian activist, born in 1817 in Slawoschin, Neustadt district
- Stanisław Maroński (1825–1907), grammar school teacher in Neustadt, published works on the subject of Polish history
