= Kreis Marienburg (West Prussia) =

Former Prussian district

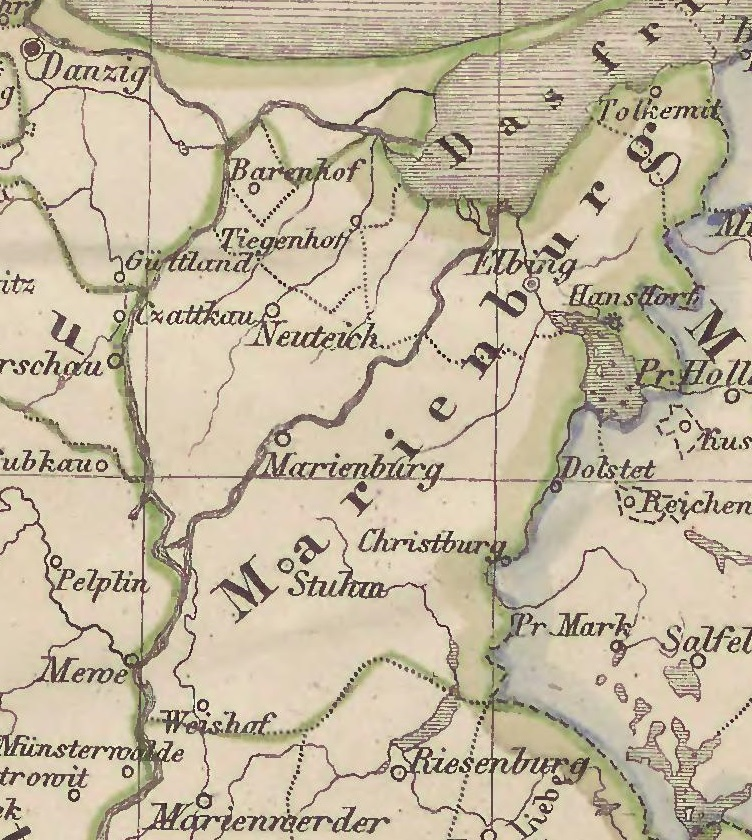
Kreis Marienburg from 1772 to 1818

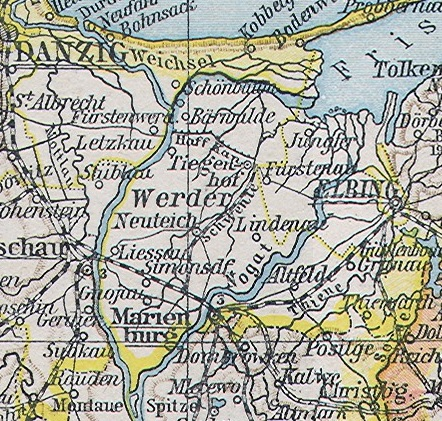
Kreis Marienburg from 1818 to 1920

The Marienburg district was a Prussian district that existed from 1772 to 1945. The district originally belonged to the province of West Prussia and was divided in 1920 by the Treaty of Versailles. Its western half fell to the Free City of Danzig, while its eastern half became part of the province of East Prussia and remained in the German Reich until 1945. The district capital was Marienburg. The territory of the district is now part of the Pomeranian Voivodeship in Poland.

Province of West Prussia (1919) Regierungsbezirk Danzig Regierungsbezirk Marienwerder

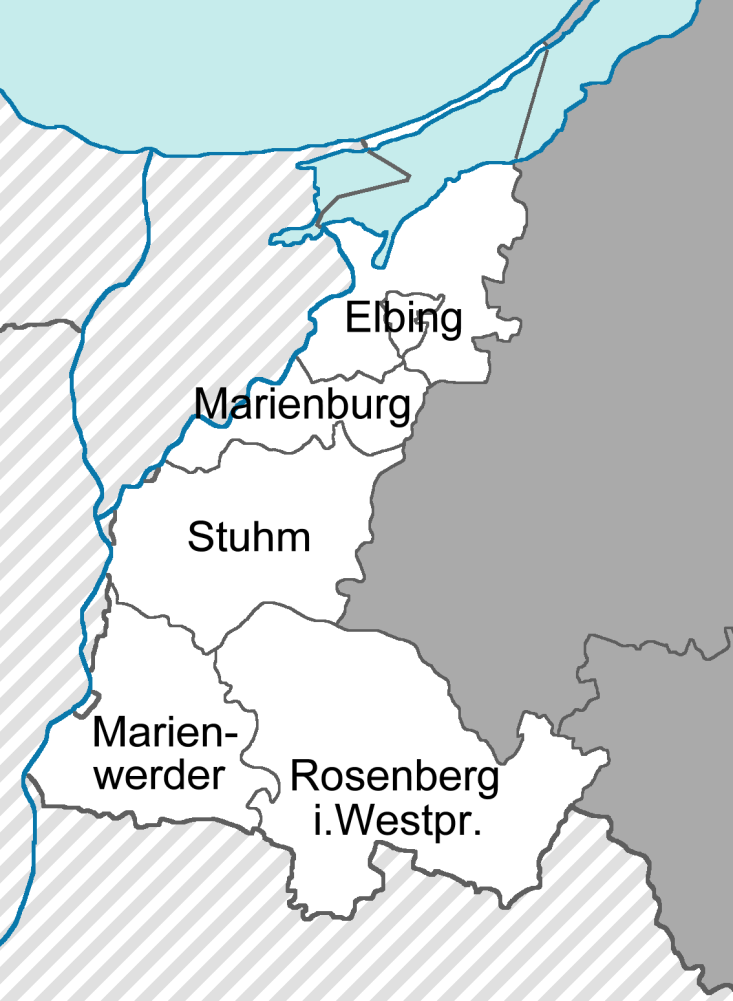
Regierungsbezirk West Prussia (1938)

== History ==
With the First Partition of Poland in 1772, the area of Marienburg became part of the Kingdom of Prussia and belonged there to the province of West Prussia, which was divided into six large districts, including the district of Marienburg. On 30 April 1815 the area became part of Regierungsbezirk Danzig with the province of West Prussia. As part of a comprehensive district reform, the old Marienburg district was significantly reduced in size on 1 April 1818. It now included the towns of Marienburg and Neuteich with their surrounding areas. The district capital was Marienburg. From 3 December 1829 to 1 April 1878, West Prussia and East Prussia were united to form the Province of Prussia, which belonged to the German Empire since 1871.

With the entry into force of the Treaty of Versailles on 10 January 1920 and the dissolution of the Province of West Prussia, the district of Marienburg was divided. The parts of the district lying to the west of the Nogat became part of the Free City of Danzig, while the area lying east of the Nogat remained in the German Reich and was provisionally subordinate to the Oberpräsident in Königsberg. To prepare for the referendum on the final membership of the district, the district area was soon subordinated to the Inter-Allied Commission for Government and Referendum in Marienwerder. After the clear result of the referendum in favor of Germany, the district remained in Germany. On 1 July 1922 the Marienburg district was formally incorporated into the province of East Prussia. Regierungsbezirk Marienwerder was renamed Regierungsbezirk West Prussia for reasons of tradition. The seat of the district president remained in Marienwerder.

On 1 September 1924 the rural communities of Tessensdorf and Willenberg from the Stuhm district were incorporated into the town of Marienburg in the Marienburg district. This was intended to compensate for the loss of territory it had suffered due to the establishment of the Free City of Danzig.

After the German invasion of Poland in 1939, the district of Marienburg became part of the newly formed Reichsgau Danzig-West Prussia, as part of Regierungsbezirk Marienwerder. In the spring of 1945 the district was occupied by the Soviet Red Army. In the summer of 1945 it was placed under Polish administration in accordance with the Potsdam Agreement and the German population of the district was expelled.

== Demographics ==
According to the Prussian census of 1837, the Marienburg district had a population of 48,556 of whom 43,237 (89%) were Germans and 5,319 (11%) were Poles or Polish-German bilinguals.

== Municipalities ==
Before its dissolution in 1945, the district comprised the following municipalities:

- Alt Rosengart
- Altfelde
- Augustwalde
- Baalau
- Eschenhorst
- Fischau
- Grunau
- Hohenwalde
- Jonasdorf
- Kampenau
- Katznase
- Klettendorf
- Königsdorf
- Kronsnest
- Lindenwald
- Marienburg, town
- Markushof
- Notzendorf
- Parwark
- Preußisch Königsdorf
- Preußisch Rosengart
- Pruppendorf
- Reichfelde
- Reichhorst
- Rosenort
- Schlablau
- Schönwiese
- Schwansdorf
- Sommerau
- Sorgenort
- Stalle
- Thiensdorf
- Thiergart
- Thiergartsfelde
- Thörichthof
- Wengeln
- Wengelwalde
