= Eduard Heinrich von Flottwell =

Prussian politician (1786–1865)

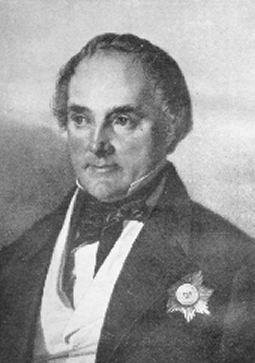
- With Order of the Black Eagle, c. 1861

Oberpräsident of the Grand Duchy of Posen
- In office December 1830 – May 1841
- Preceded by: Theodor von Baumann; Antoni Radziwiłł (as Duke-Governor)
- Succeeded by: Adolf Heinrich von Arnim-Boitzenburg

Oberpräsident of the Province of Saxony
- In office May 1841 – 1844
- Preceded by: Anton of Stolberg-Wernigerode
- Succeeded by: Wilhelm von Wedell

Oberpräsident of the Province of Westphalia
- In office 1846 – July 1850
- Preceded by: Justus Wilhelm Eduard von Schaper
- Succeeded by: Franz von Duesberg

Oberpräsident of the Province of Prussia
- In office 1849–1850
- Preceded by: Rudolf von Auerswald
- Succeeded by: Franz August Eichmann

Oberpräsident of the Province of Brandenburg
- In office 1850–1862
- Preceded by: Klemens von Wolff-Metternich
- Succeeded by: Werner von Selchow

Personal details
- Born: 23 July 1786 Insterburg, East Prussia, Kingdom of Prussia
- Died: 28 May 1865 (aged 78) Berlin, Kingdom of Prussia
- Citizenship: Prussian
- Children: Julius Adalbert Flottwell

Eduard Heinrich Flottwell (23 July 1786 – 28 May 1865; after 1861 von Flottwell) was a Prussian Staatsminister. He served as Oberpräsident (governor) of the Grand Duchy of Posen (from 1830) and of the Saxony (from 1841), Westphalia (from 1846), Prussia (1849–1850) and Brandenburg (from 1850) provinces. He was also Prussian minister of finance (1844-1846) and interior minister (1858-1859).

== Early life ==
Flottwell was born in Insterburg in the Province of East Prussia (present-day Chernyakhovsk in Russian Kaliningrad Oblast), studied law at the University of Königsberg and entered the civil service at the Insterburg court in 1805.

== Career ==
From 1812 he was a member of the East Prussian Regierungspräsidium of Gumbinnen. After the Napoleonic Wars he together with Oberpräsident Theodor von Schön re-organised the administration of the West Prussian province at Danzig. In 1825 he was appointed Regierungspräsident of Marienwerder.

When in 1830 the Polish November Uprising led by Michał Gedeon Radziwiłł broke out at Warsaw in Russian Congress Poland, his brother Antoni Radziwiłł was dismissed as Duke-Governor of the Prussian Grand Duchy of Posen by King Frederick William III and the sole rule passed to Flottwell as the new Oberpräsident. He was a strong supporter of Germanisation and standardised schooling policies, which by some was seen as directed against ethnic Polish Prussians in the region. In 1843, in "Anerkennung der Hilfe nach dem großen Hamburger Brand" (acknowledgment of the assistance after the great Hamburg fire), he was named an honorary citizen of Hamburg.
