= Kreis Berent =

District of Prussia

Province of West Prussia (1919) Regierungsbezirk Danzig Regierungsbezirk Marienwerder

The Berent district was a Prussian district that existed from 1818 to 1920. It was in the part of West Prussia that fell to Poland after World War I in 1920. Its capital was Berent. From 1939 to 1945, the district was re-established in German-occupied Poland as part of the newly established Reichsgau Danzig-West Prussia. Today the territory of the district is located in the Polish Pomeranian Voivodeship.

== History ==
With the First Partition of Poland in 1772, the area of the future Berent district was annexed by the Kingdom of Prussia and initially belonged to the Stargard district in the province of West Prussia. On 30 April 1815 the Stargard district became part of Regierungsbezirk Danzig. As part of a comprehensive district reform, the new Berent district was formed on 1 April 1818 from parts of the old Stargard district. It included the towns of Berent and Schöneck. The district office was in Berent. The district bordered in the west on the Pomeranian district of Bütow, in the north on the district of Karthaus and the district of Danzig, in the east on the district of Preußisch Stargard and in the south on the district of Konitz.

From 3 December 1829 to 1 April 1878, West Prussia and East Prussia were united to form the Province of Prussia, which had belonged to the German Reich since January 1871. Due to the provisions of the Treaty of Versailles, the Berent district had to be ceded by the German Reich on 10 January 1920. Most of the district fell to Poland. Several communities in the northeastern part of the district were ceded to the Free City of Danzig and were assigned to the Danziger Höhe district.

== Demographics ==
The district had a mixed population of Germans, Kashubians and Poles.

Ethnolinguistic structure of Kreis Berent
Year	Population	German		Polish / Kashubian / Bilingual / Other	
1837	24,540	7,216	29.4%	17,324	70.6%
1855	34,718	12,483	36.0%	22,235	64.0%
1861	38,767	18,572	47.9%	20,195	52.1%
1900	49,821	22,664	45.5%	27,157	54.5%
1905	53,726	23,515	43.8%	30,211	56.2%
1910	55,976	23,682	42.3%	32,294	57.7%

== Politics ==
=== District administrators ===
- 1818–1825: Johann Carl von Schulz
- 1825–1853: Ludwig Blindow
- 1853–1896: Hermann Engler
- 1896–1920: Friedrich Trüstedt

=== Elections ===
In the German Empire, the districts of Berent and Preußisch Stargard formed the Reichstag constituency of Danzig 5. This constituency was won by candidates from the Polish Party in all elections to the Reichstag between 1871 and 1912.

== Municipalities ==
In 1910, the Berent district contained the following municipalities:

- Adlig Schönfließ
- Alt Barkoschin
- Alt Bukowitz
- Alt Grabau
- Alt Kischau
- Alt Paleschken
- Alt und Neu Englershütte
- Barenhütte^{DZ}
- Barloggen
- Bebernitz
- Beek
- Berent, town
- Blumfelde
- Demlin
- Dobrogosch
- Dzimianen
- Eichenberg
- Ellerbruch^{DZ}
- Fersenau
- Foßhütte
- Funkelkau
- Gartschin
- Gillnitz
- Gladau
- Golluhn
- Grabaushütte
- Grenzacker^{DZ}
- Groß Klinsch
- Groß Lipschin
- Groß Pallubin
- Grünthal
- Grzibau
- Hoch Liniewo
- Hoch Paleschken
- Hornikau
- Jarischau
- Jaschhütte
- Jeseritz
- Jungfernberg
- Juschken
- Kalisch
- Kamerau
- Kamerauofen
- Kartowen
- Klein Bendomin
- Klein Pallubin
- Kleschkau
- Konarschin
- Königlich Boschpol
- Königlich Schönfließ
- Königsdorf
- Kornen
- Koschmin
- Lienfelde
- Lindenberg
- Liniewken
- Lippischau
- Lippusch
- Lorenz
- Lubahn
- Lubianen
- Neu Barkoschin
- Neu Bukowitz
- Neu Ciß
- Neu Fietz
- Neu Grabau
- Neuhöfel
- Neu Kischau
- Neu Klinsch
- Neu Lipschin
- Neu Paleschken
- Neu Podleß
- Neuwieck
- Niedamowo
- Niederhölle^{DZ}
- Oberhölle^{DZ}
- Ober Mahlkau
- Ober Schridlau
- Ochsenkopf^{DZ}
- Olpuch
- Piechowitz
- Plachti
- Plense
- Plotzitz
- Pogutken
- Poldersee
- Raduhn
- Recknitz
- Rottenberg
- Sanddorf
- Sawadda
- Schadrau
- Scharshütte^{DZ}
- Schatarpi
- Schlusa
- Schöneck, town
- Schönheide
- Schwarzhof
- Schwarzhütte^{DZ}
- Schwarzin
- Sietzenhütte
- Sobonsch
- Spohn
- Squirawen
- Stawisken
- Stoffershütte
- Strauchhütte^{DZ}
- StrippauDZ
- Trockenhütte^{DZ}
- Trzebuhn
- Tuschkau
- Wenzkau
- Wiesenthal^{DZ}
- Wigonin
- Wischin
- Woithal

The municipalities marked ^{DZ} became part of the Danziger Höhe district in the Free City of Danzig. All other municipalities fell to Poland in 1920.

== Landkreis Berent in occupied Poland (1939-1945) ==
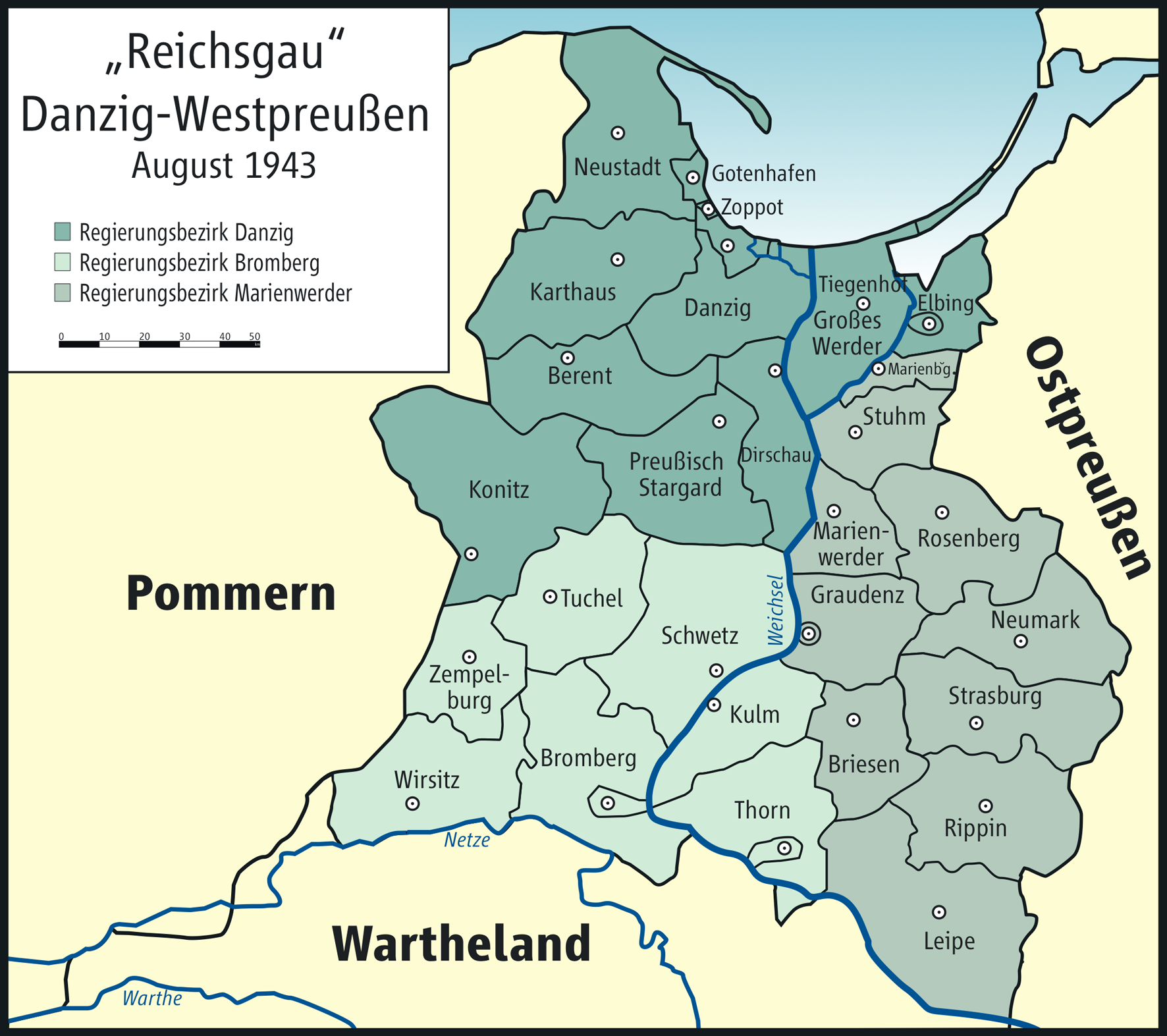
Danzig-West Prussia (1943)

=== History ===
After the German invasion of Poland, on 26 November 1939, the Berent district became part of the administrative region of Danzig in the newly formed Reichsgau Danzig-West Prussia. The towns of Berent and Schöneck were subject to the German municipal code of 30 January 1935, which was valid in the Altreich and provided for the enforcement of the Führerprinzip at the municipal level. On 1 December 1939, 11 communities from the northern part of the Berent district were transferred to the new Danzig district. Towards the end of World War II, the district was occupied by the Red Army in the spring of 1945 and was restored to Poland. The remaining German population was expelled.

=== District administrators ===
- 1939–1940: Günter Modrow
- 1940–1941: Kurt Witte
- 1941–1944: Heinz Hesemann

=== Place names ===
On 25 June 1942 all place names were Germanized with the consent of the Reich Minister of the Interior. Either the name from 1918 was retained or - if "not German" enough - acoustically adjusted or translated, for example:

- Gostomken: Fichtenau
- Groß Pallubin: Großpahlen
- Konarschin: Kunertsfeld
- Neupodleß: Neupoldersee
- Olpuch: Klettenhagen
- Stawisken: Teichdorf
- Trzebuhn: Tremborn
- Wigonin: Angersdorf
