= Landkreis Thorn =

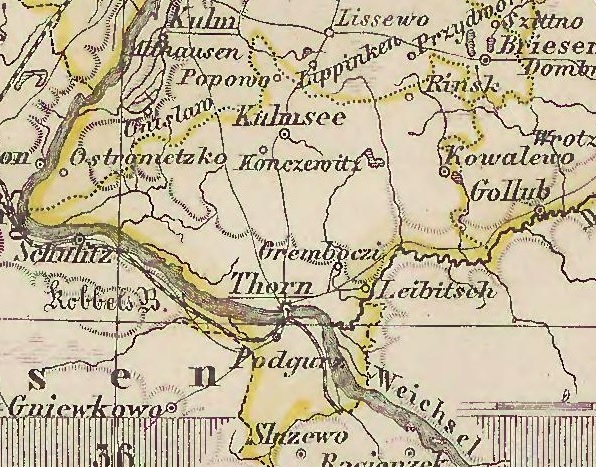
Thorn district (1818-1887)

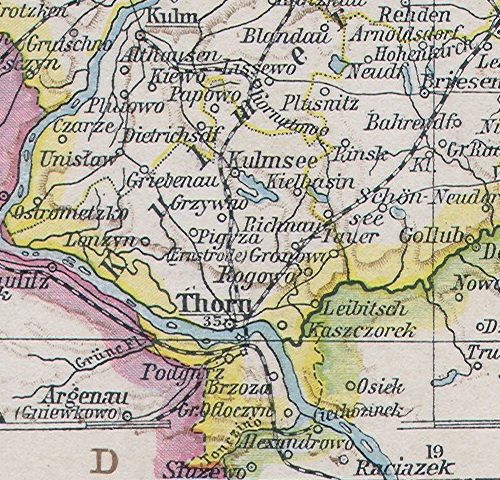
Thorn district (1887-1920)

Province of West Prussia (1919) Regierungsbezirk Danzig Regierungsbezirk Marienwerder

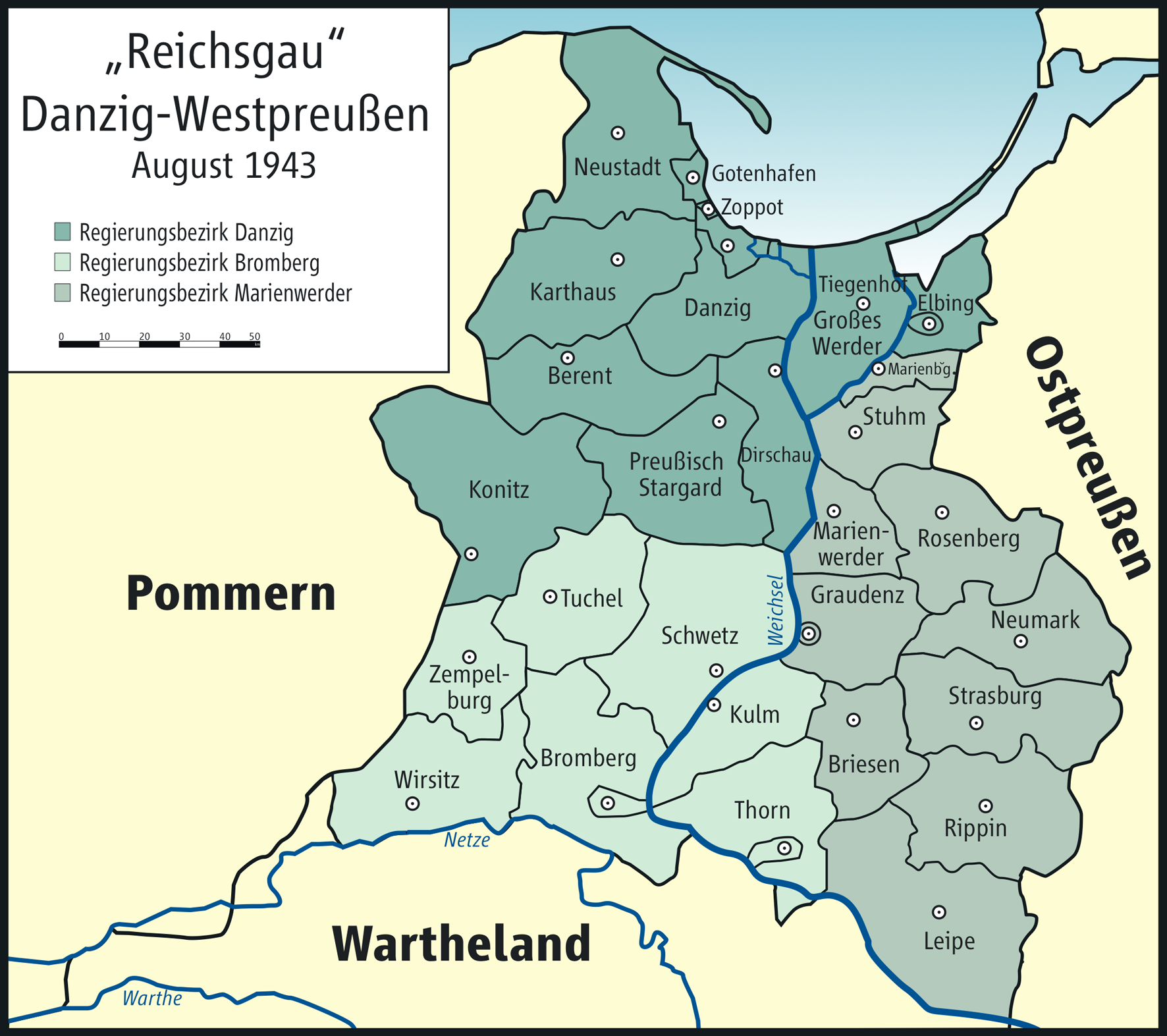
Reichsgau Danzig-West Prussia

The district of Thorn was a Prussian district in the Marienwerder administrative region that existed from 1818 to 1920. It belonged to the province of West Prussia, except for the period from 1829 to 1878 when it was part of the Province of Prussia. Its capital was Thorn. It was in the part of West Prussia that fell to Poland after World War I in 1920 through the Treaty of Versailles. From 1939 to 1945, the district of Thorn was re-established in Reichsgau Danzig-West Prussia in occupied Poland. Today, the area of the district is in the Kuyavian-Pomeranian Voivodeship in Poland.

== Geography ==
The district was located in Chełmno Land in the extreme south of West Prussia and was traversed by the Vistula river, with the greater part of the district area lying on the right (eastern) bank. With the city of Thorn, which was independent from 1900, the district had a major urban center, which was not the case everywhere in the sparsely populated West Prussia. The even larger city of Bromberg was immediately west of the district area.

The district bordered the West Prussian districts of Briesen and Kulm in the north. In the southwest were the districts of Bromberg and Hohensalza, which belonged to the Province of Posen. In the southeast, the district bordered Congress Poland, which was part of the Russian Empire.

== History ==
The northern part of the district was annexed by Prussia through the First Partition of Poland in 1772. The city of Thorn and its neighboring towns followed in 1793, as part of the Second Partition of Poland. On April 30, 1815, the area became part of the Marienwerder administrative region in the Province of West Prussia. As part of a comprehensive district reform, the new district of Thorn (German: Kreis Thorn) was formed on April 1, 1818. This included the urban centers of Culmsee, Schönsee, Podgorz and Thorn. The seat of the district office was in the city of Thorn.

From December 3, 1829, to April 1, 1878, West Prussia and East Prussia were united to form the Province of Prussia, which had belonged to the German Reich since 1871. On October 1, 1887, the Thorn district ceded part of its territory, including the town of Schönsee, to the new district of Briesen. Since April 1, 1900, the city of Thorn formed its own urban district, Stadtkreis Thorn. The remainder of the Thorn district was called Landkreis Thorn. On April 1, 1906, the rural communities of Mocker and Korzeniec were incorporated into the urban district of Thorn. As a result of the Versailles Treaty, the district of Thorn had to be ceded by Germany to Poland on January 10, 1920.

After the invasion of Poland in 1939, the territory of the Polish Corridor was annexed by Nazi Germany. On November 26, 1939, the Thorn district under its German name became part of Regierungsbezirk Bromberg in the newly formed Reichsgau Danzig-West Prussia. In the spring of 1945 the district was occupied by the Red Army and was restored to Poland. In the following years, the remaining German population was expelled.

== Demographics ==
The district had a mixed population of Germans and Poles.

Ethnolinguistic structure of Landkreis Thorn
Year	Population	German		Polish / Bilingual	
1905	58,765	27,508	46.8%	31,257	53.2%
1910	59,317	27,751	46.8%	31,566	53.2%

== Elections ==
In the German Empire, the constituency of Marienwerder 4 was formed from the districts of Thorn and Kulm. The constituency was won by either National Liberal or Polish candidates in the Reichstag elections from 1871 to 1912.

== Municipalities ==
In 1910, the district of Thorn included the two towns of Culmsee and Podgorz and 66 rural communities.

- Alt Thorn
- Amthal
- Balkau
- Bildschön
- Birglau
- Bischöflich Papau
- Biskupitz
- Boguslawken
- Bruchnowo
- Chrapitz
- Culmsee, town
- Deutsch Rogau
- Dreilinden
- Eichenau
- Elisenau
- Ellermühl
- Folgowo
- Gostgau
- Grabowitz
- Gramtschen
- Griffen
- Groß Bösendorf
- Groß Nessau
- Groß Rogau
- Gurske
- Guttau
- Hermannsdorf
- Herzogsfelde
- Hohenhausen
- Kaschorek
- Klein Bösendorf
- Klein Nessau
- Kompanie
- Konczewitz
- Kostbar
- Leibitsch
- Lonzyn
- Luben
- Lulkau
- Mlynietz
- Neu Culmsee
- Neubruch
- Neudorf
- Ober Nessau
- Ottlotschin
- Ottlotschinek
- Pensau
- Piask
- Podgorz, town
- Rentschkau
- Roßgarten
- Rudak
- Sachsenbrück
- Scharnau
- Schillno
- Schmolln
- Schönwalde
- Schwarzbruch
- Seglein
- Siemon
- Smolnik
- Staw
- Steinau
- Stewken
- Swierczyn
- Thornisch Papau
- Ziegelwiese
- Zlotterie
