= Kreis Löbau (West Prussia) =

District in Poland

The Löbau district (German: Kreis Löbau) was a Prussian district in the Marienwerder administrative region that existed from 1818 to 1920. The seat of the district administration was in the city of Neumark. The district belonged to the part of West Prussia that fell to Poland after World War I through the Treaty of Versailles in 1920. Today, the territory of the district is in the Warmian-Masurian Voivodeship in Poland.

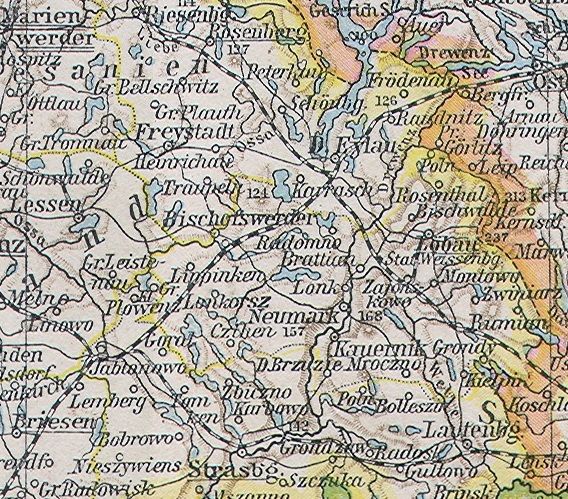
Kreis Löbau in 1890

Province of West Prussia (1919) Regierungsbezirk Danzig Regierungsbezirk Marienwerder

== History ==
The area of the Löbau district was annexed by Prussia during the First Partition of Poland in 1772 and belonged to the Michelau district until 1818. In 1815, the area became part of Regierungsbezirk Marienwerder in the province of West Prussia. As part of a comprehensive district reform, the Michelau district was divided into the Löbau and Strasburg districts on April 1, 1818. From December 3, 1829 to April 1, 1878, West Prussia and East Prussia were united as the Province of Prussia, which had belonged to the German Empire since 1871. After World War I, the largely Polish-speaking district of Löbau had to be ceded to Poland on January 10, 1920 in accordance with the Treaty of Versailles.

== Demographics ==
Population of the Löbau district
	1831		1861	
Germans	3,868	14.3%	8,956	20.8%
Poles	23,225	85.7%	34,059	79.2%
Total	27,093		43,015	

== Elections ==
In the German Empire, the district of Löbau together with the district of Rosenberg formed the Reichstag constituency of Marienwerder 2. The constituency was always won by conservative candidates except for the elections of 1890 and 1893, in which the Polish candidate won.

== Municipalities ==
In 1910, the Löbau district comprised the two towns of Löbau and Neumark as well as 97 rural communities:

Municipalities in Kreis Löbau (West Prussia)
Adlig Iwanken; Bischwalde; Brattian; Bratuszewo; Chrosle; Czichen; Deutsch Brzozie; Eichwalde; Fittowo; Gay; Grabau; Grischlin; Grodziczno; Grondy; Gronowo; Groß Ballowken; Groß Ossowken; Groß Pacoltowo; Guttowo; Gwisdzyn; Hartowitz; Jamielnik; Jeglia; Kaczek; Kamionken; Kauernik; Kazanitz; Kielpin; Klein Ballowken; Klein Rehwalde; Kon; Königlich Borrek; Kopaniarze	Krottoschin; Krzeminiewo; Kulingen; Lekarth; Linnowitz; Lipowitz; Lippinken; Löbau; Londzek; Londzyn; Lonkorsz; Lorken; Lossen; Ludwigsthal; Marzencitz; Montowo; Mortung; Mroczenko; Mroczno; Naguszewo; Nawra; Nelberg; Neuhof; Neumark; Nikolaiken; Omulle; Ossettno; Ostaszewo; Otremba; Petersdorf; Pomierken; Pronikau; Raczek	Radomno; Rakowitz; Rohrfeld; Rommen; Rosenthal; Ruda; Rumian; Rybno; Rynnek; Samplau; Schwarzenau; Skarlin; Stephansdorf; Sugainko; Summin; Swiniarc; Targowisko; Terreschewo; Thomasdorf; Tillitz; Tillitzken; Truszczyn; Waldek; Wardengowko; Wawerwitz; Werry; Wonno; Zajonskowo; Zakurzewo; Zaribinnek; Zielkau; Zlottowo; Zwinniarz
