= Danzig (region) =

Former region in Prussia

Coordinates: 54°10′N 19°00′E

Danzig Regierungsbezirk Danzig
- Region
- Interactive map of Danzig
- Country: Prussia (since 1871 part of Germany)
- Province: West Prussia (till 1829 and after 1878); Province of Prussia (1829-1878)
- Established: 1815
- Seat: Danzig

Administrative regions of West Prussia: Regierungsbezirk Danzig Regierungsbezirk Marienwerder

The Danzig Region (Regierungsbezirk Danzig) was a government region, within the Prussian Provinces of West Prussia and Prussia. The regional capital was Danzig (Gdańsk). Prussian government regions were not bodies of regional self-rule of the districts and cities comprised, but shear top-to-down government agencies to apply federal or state law and supervise local entities of self-rules, such as municipalities, rural and urban districts.

== History ==
Polish westerly Royal Prussia was annexed by the easterly Kingdom of Prussia during the late 18th century Partitions of Poland, with the city of Danzig becoming part of the Prussian Kingdom in 1793. The territory was administered in the new province of West Prussia (1772-1829, 1878-1920) and the new Province of Prussia (1829-1878).

In 1815, after the Napoleonic Wars, West Prussia was divided into the Regions of Marienwerder and Danzig. While the governor and provincial authorities were based in Danzig, the provincial court was in the town of Marienwerder in West Prussia (Kwidzyn).

West Prussia was reorganised into districts (Kreise) within each government region from 1815–18. The Danzig Region included the urban districts (Stadtkreise) of Danzig and Elbing (Elbląg) (since 1874), as well as the rural districts of Berent, Danzig-Land, Elbing-Land, Karthaus, Marienburg, Neustadt, and Preußisch Stargard.

In 1887 a number of districts changed in the Danzig Region. The rural district of Danzig was divided into the rural districts of Danziger Höhe (Danzig Heights) and Danziger Niederung (Danzig Lowlands); the seats of each district were in the city of Danzig. Two more new districts were formed, the southern parts of the former Danzig District became part of the new Dirschau District. The northern areas of the Neustadt District were partitioned off to form the new Putzig.

As a result of World War I, the Treaty of Versailles allocated most of West Prussia to the Second Polish Republic, and the Danzig Region was dissolved in 1920. The city of Danzig and its environs became the Free City of Danzig. A few eastern areas of the Danzig Region remained in the Free State of Prussia in Weimar Germany, however. In 1920 the rural districts of Elbing and Marienburg in West Prussia as well as the city of Elbing were added to the truncated Marienwerder Region, which in 1922 was renamed as West Prussia Region for reason of tradition when it was transferred from the defunct Province of West Prussia to the Province of East Prussia.

== Districts ==
=== Urban districts ===
Danzig formed an urban district from the beginning, Elbing reached that status in 1874 and was thus partitioned from Elbing Rural District, and several times enlarged on the expense of the surrounding rural district.

1. 1818-1920: Stadtkreis Danzig (Gdańsk); thereafter persisting as urban district within Free Danzig
2. 1874-1920: Stadtkreis Elbing (Elbląg); thereafter persisting till 1945 as an urban district in Germany

=== Rural districts ===
The period when a district formed part of the Danzig Region is indicated by the years before the district names.

1. 1818-1920: Berent, seated in Berent in West Prussia (Kościerzyna);
2. 1818-1887: Danzig-Land, seat: Russoschin (till 1828), Praust (till 1845), then Danzig; partitioned into the new districts of Danzig Heights, Lowlands and Dirschau
3. 1887-1920: Danziger Höhe (Heights), seat: Danzig; the district persisted till 1939 as part of Free Danzig
4. 1887-1920: Danziger Niederung (Lowlands), seat: Danzig; the district persisted till 1939 as part of Free Danzig
5. 1772–1818, 1887-1920: Dirschau, seat: Dirschau (Tczew)
6. 1818-1920: Elbing-Land, seat: Elbing; persisting till 1945 as a rural district in Germany, with its area west of the Nogat ceded to the new Großes Werder district in Free Danzig
7. 1818-1920: Karthaus, seat: Carthaus/Karthaus in West Prussia (Kartuzy)
8. 1818-1920: Marienburg, seat: Marienburg (Malbork); persisting till 1945 as a rural district in Germany, with its area west of the Nogat ceded to Großes Werder district in Free Danzig
9. 1818-1920: Neustadt, seat: Neustadt (Wejherowo)
10. 1772-1920: Preußisch Stargard, seat: Preußisch Stargard (Starogard Gdański)
11. 1887-1920: Putzig, seated in Putzig (Puck); the district was partitioned from the Neustadt District, northern part

== Demographics ==
The Danzig region had a German majority population with significant minorities of Poles and Kashubians.

Ethnolinguistic Structure of Regierungsbezirk Danzig (1910)
| District (Kreis) | Polish name | Population | German | % | Polish / Kashubian / Bilingual | % |
|---|---|---|---|---|---|---|
| Berent | Kościerzyna | 55,976 | 23,682 | 42.3% | 32,287 | 57.7% |
| Danziger Höhe | Gdańsk | 53,506 | 47,397 | 88.6% | 6,071 | 11.3% |
| Danziger Niederung | Gdańsk | 36,345 | 36,008 | 99.1% | 327 | 0.9% |
| Stadtkreis Danzig | Gdańsk | 170,337 | 164,343 | 96.5% | 5,521 | 3.2% |
| Landkreis Elbing | Elbląg | 38,611 | 38,558 | 99.9% | 48 | 0.1% |
| Stadtkreis Elbing | Elbląg | 58,636 | 58,330 | 99.5% | 248 | 0.4% |
| Karthaus | Kartuzy | 69,891 | 19,319 | 27.6% | 50,568 | 72.4% |
| Marienburg | Malbork | 62,999 | 61,050 | 96.9% | 1,924 | 3.1% |
| Neustadt | Wejherowo | 61,620 | 30,932 | 50.2% | 30,661 | 49.8% |
| Putzig | Puck | 26,548 | 7,970 | 30.0% | 18,561 | 69.9% |
| Preußisch Stargard | Starogard Gdański | 65,427 | 17,165 | 26.2% | 48,250 | 73.7% |
| Dirschau | Tczew | 42,723 | 27,865 | 65.2% | 14,846 | 34.7% |
| Total | - | 742,619 | 532,619 | 71.7% | 209,312 | 28.2% |

Demographic evolution of the Danzig Region (1837-1910)
| Year | Population | German | % | Polish / Kashubian / Bilingual | % |
|---|---|---|---|---|---|
| 1837 | 341,975 | 217,582 | 63.6% | 124,393 | 36.4% |
| 1852 | 417,108 | 266,001 | 63.8% | 151,107 | 36.2% |
| 1890 | 589,176 | 421,125 | 71.5% | 167,642 | 28.5% |
| 1900 | 665,988 | 477,589 | 71.7% | 187,578 | 28.2% |
| 1905 | 709,312 | 511,423 | 72.1% | 197,295 | 27.8% |
| 1910 | 742,619 | 532,619 | 71.7% | 209,312 | 28.2% |

== District presidents ==
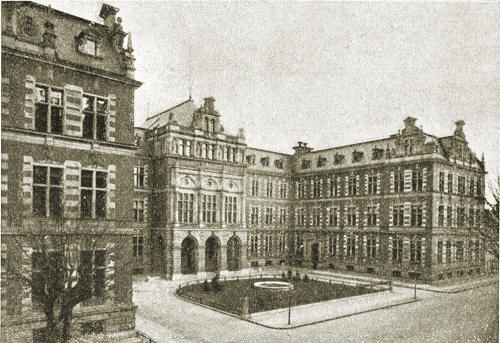
Seat of the Government of Danzig

Each of the nineteen Regierungsbezirke featured a non-legislative governing body called a Regierungspräsidium or Bezirksregierung (district government) headed by a Regierungspräsident (district president), concerned mostly with administrative decisions on a local level for districts within its jurisdiction.

| 1816–1819: Theodor von Schön (1773–1856) 1819–1825: Theodor Nicolovius (1768–1831) 1825–1840: Johann Carl Rothe (1771–1853) 1841–1863: Robert von Blumenthal (1806–1892) 1863–1868: Robert von Prittwitz und Gaffron (1806–1889) 1868–1876: Gustav von Diest (1826–1911) 1876–1878: Otto von Hoffmann (1833–1905) | 1878–1881: Heinrich von Achenbach (1829–1899) 1881–1883: Wilhelm von Saltzwedel (1820–1882) 1883–1887: Anton Rothe (1837–1905) 1887–1890: Adolf von Heppe (1836–1899) 1890–1902: Friedrich von Holwede (1841–1921) 1902–1909: Jaroslaw von Jarotzky (1851–1928) 1909–1918: Lothar Foerster (1865–1939) |
