= Arnau Church =

Church in Rodnink, Russia

Coordinates: 54.700647°N 20.667729°E

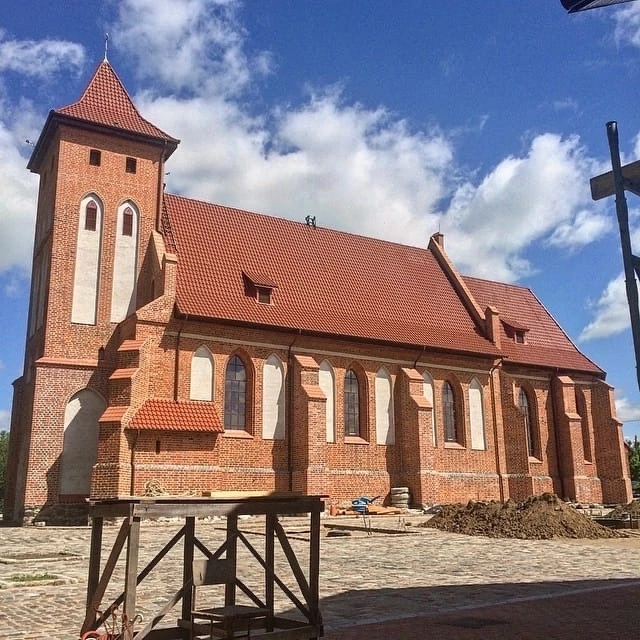

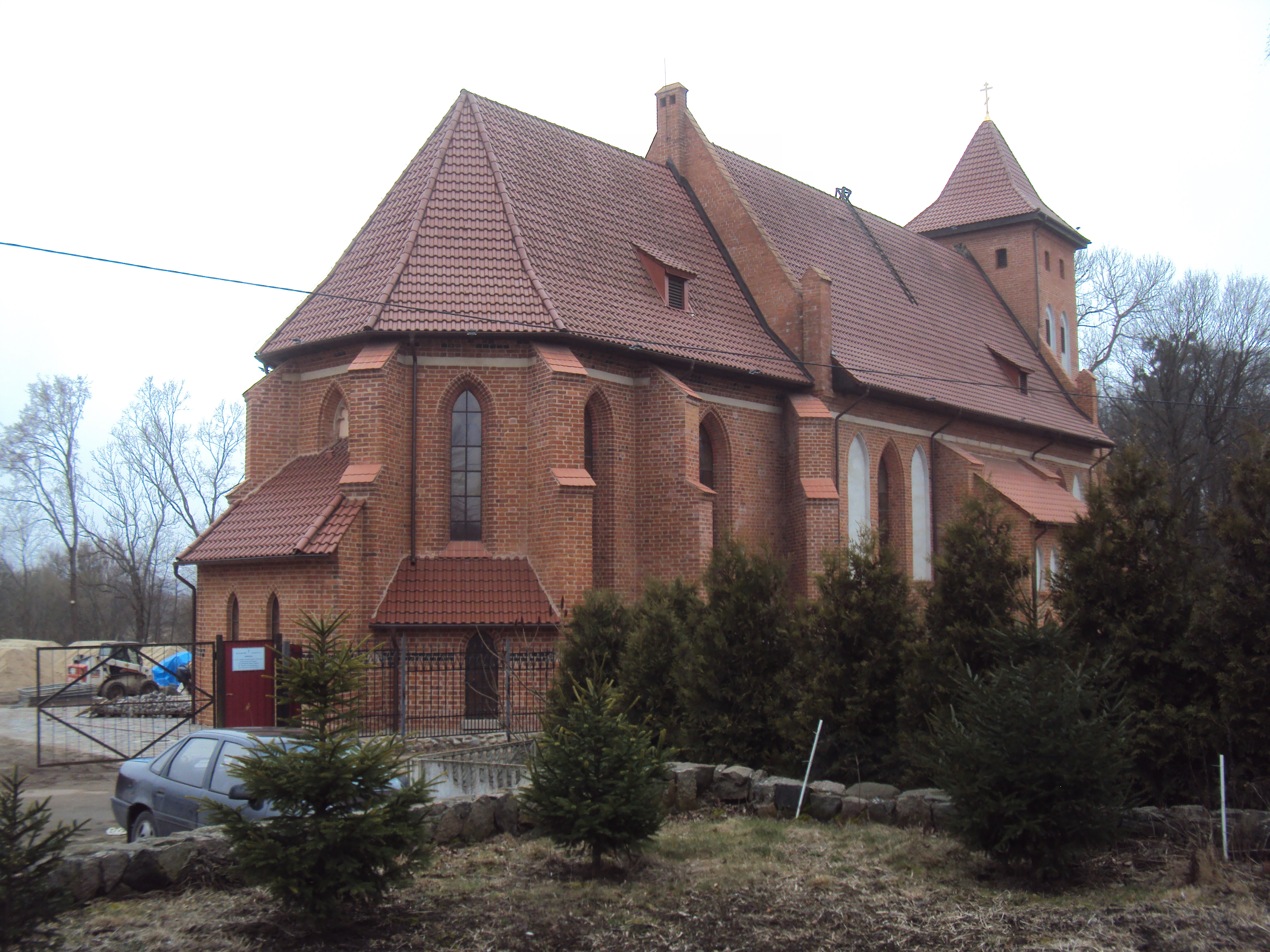

The Arnau Church (German: Kirche Arnau) of St. Catherine of Alexandria is a Brick Gothic church 8 km east of Kaliningrad near the Pregolya River and the Russian-Lithuanian border.

It was built in the 14th century as a Catholic church in the East Prussian village of Arnau (modern Rodniki) and until recently contained more than 200 medieval frescoes from the 14th century. It became a Lutheran church after the Reformation and the frescoes were whitewashed, then uncovered in the early 20th century. The graveyard contains the tomb of Theodor von Schön.

After 1945, when the Kaliningrad region became part of the Soviet Union, the church was used for grain storage. In 2003 a restoration campaign was launched, with the church building then belonging to the Kaliningrad History Museum, which used it for exhibitions and orthodox liturgy.

In 2010 local legislators transferred the ownership of the church to the Russian Orthodox Church, and Church officials started a renovation that caused irreversible damage to the frescoes. Prof. Dr. Nicole Riedl, a restoration expert in medieval wall paintings at Hawk University of Applied Sciences and Arts in Hildesheim, described the frescoes as being "irretrievably lost" in a 2014 report prepared for the German-based Kuratorium Arnau, an organization created in 1992 to conserve the church and its frescoes. As a result of the report, the Kaliningrad Diocese of the Russian Orthodox Church cut off relations with Kuratorium Arnau. Riedl later said to The Art Newspaper that only 2-3% of the frescoes now survived, and that the Russian Orthodox Church had "deliberately destroyed" the rest.
