= Kreis Karthaus =

Former Prussian district

The Karthaus district was a Prussian district that existed from 1818 to 1920. It was located in the part of West Prussia that fell to Poland after World War I through the Treaty of Versailles in 1920, as part of the Polish Corridor. The capital of the district was Karthaus. From 1939 to 1945, the district was re-established as part of Reichsgau Danzig-West Prussia in occupied Poland. Today the territory of the district lies in the Polish Pomeranian Voivodeship.

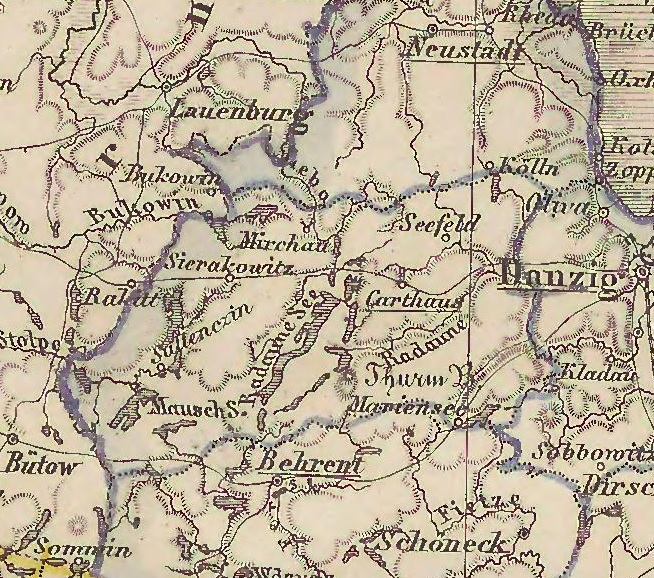
Kreis Karthaus (1818 to 1920)

Province of West Prussia Regierungsbezirk Danzig Regierungsbezirk Marienwerder

== History ==
With the First Partition of Poland in 1772, the territory of the future Karthaus district became part of the Kingdom of Prussia, and it was initially divided between the Dirschau and Stargard districts in the province of West Prussia. On April 30, 1815, the area was made part of Regierungsbezirk Danzig. As part of a comprehensive district reform, parts of the old Dirschau and Stargard districts were separated to form the new Carthaus district on April 1, 1818. The spelling of the name of the town and the district was changed to Karthaus, over the course of the 19th century. From December 3, 1829, to April 1, 1878, West Prussia and East Prussia were united to form the Province of Prussia, which had belonged to the German Empire since 1871.

Due to the provisions of the Versailles Treaty, the Karthaus district had to be ceded by the German Reich on January 10, 1920. Most of the district fell to Poland and continued to exist as Powiat Kartuski in the new Pomeranian Voivodeship. Several communities in the east of the district fell to the Free City of Danzig and were assigned to the Danziger Höhe district. On November 30, 1920, there was an exchange of territory between Poland and Germany. The localities Żukówko and Mühlchen, which had belonged to the Karthaus district in Poland, were transferred to the Bütow district in the Prussian Province of Pomerania, while the localities Pommersch Prondzonka, Althütte bei Buchwalde and Schellews were transferred from the Bütow district to Poland.

== Demographics ==
Ethnolinguistic structure of the district
Year	1831	1837	1852	1855	1858	1861	1890	1892	1900	1905	1910
% of Poles / Kashubians	85%	84%	77%	76%	76%	77%	68%	76%	69%	70%	72%
% of Germans / Others	15%	16%	23%	24%	24%	23%	32%	24%	31%	30%	28%
Total population of the district	29,144	31,406	42,371	45,042	47,622	51,348	59,348	59,855	62,990	66,612	69,891
