= Kreis Stuhm =

Former Prussian district

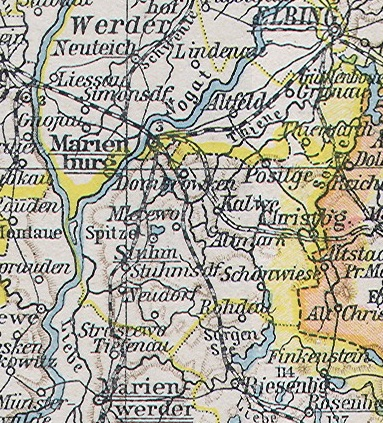
Kreis Stuhm (1818-1945)

Province of West Prussia Regierungsbezirk Danzig Regierungsbezirk Marienwerder

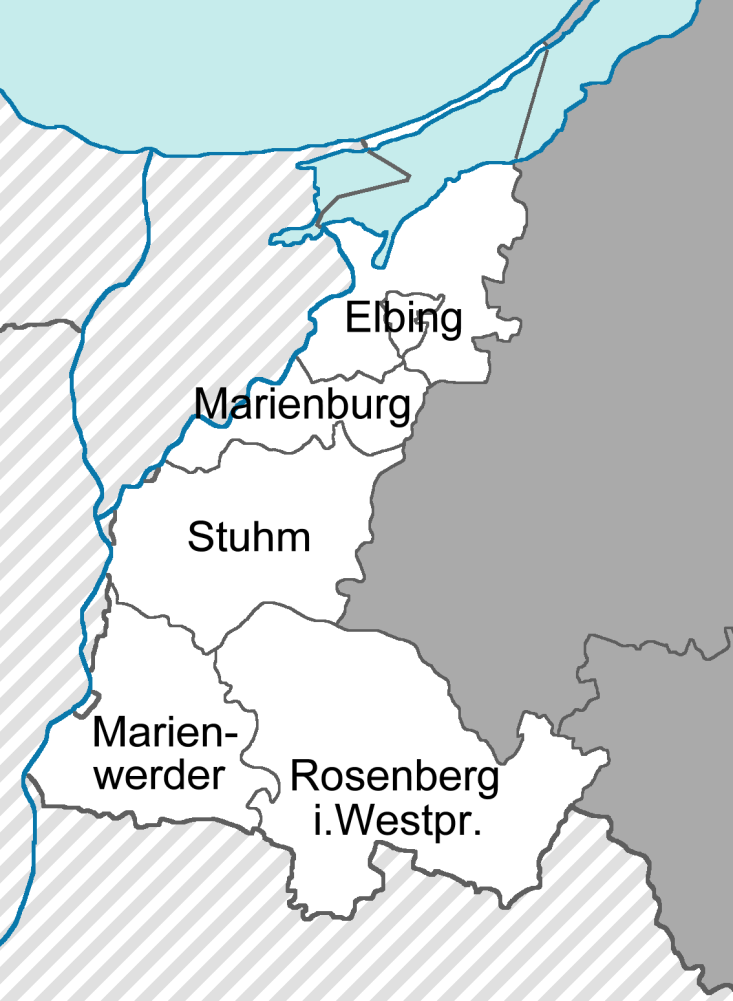
Regierungsbezirk West Prussia, in August 1939

The Stuhm district was a Prussian district that existed between 1818 and 1945. It belonged to the part of West Prussia that remained in the German Reich after World War I and was since part of the province of East Prussia. Today, the territory of the district is located in the Pomeranian Voivodeship in Poland.

== History ==
The area of the Stuhm district was annexed by Prussia during the First Partition of Poland in 1772 and belonged to the Marienburg district until 1818. As part of a comprehensive district reform in the province of West Prussia, the new Stuhm district was formed on 1 April 1818 from the southern part of the Marienburg district. It comprised the towns of Christburg and Stuhm.

From 3 December 1829 to 1 April 1878, West Prussia and East Prussia were united to form the Province of Prussia, which became part of the German Empire in 1871. With the entry into force of the Treaty of Versailles on 10 January 1920 and the associated dissolution of the Province of West Prussia, the Stuhm district was initially subordinated to the Oberpräsident in Königsberg. In preparation for the referendum on the future membership of the district, it was subordinated to the Inter-Allied Commission for Government and Referendum in Marienwerder. In the referendum on 1 July 1920, 80 percent of the voters in the Stuhm district decided that the district would remain in the German Reich. On 1 July 1922 the Stuhm district was incorporated into the province of East Prussia. Regierungsbezirk Marienwerder was renamed Regierungsbezirk Westpreußen for reasons of tradition.

On 1 September 1924 the rural communities of Tessensdorf and Willenberg were transferred from the Stuhm district to the Marienburg district and were incorporated into the town of Marienburg. After the invasion of Poland in 1939, the Stuhm district became part of the newly formed Reichsgau Danzig-West Prussia. In the spring of 1945, the Red Army conquered the district and placed it under Polish administration. Many of the local people were expelled until 1947 under Polish rule.After assumption of Polish rule after the Second World War, 700 locals were deported to the remainder of Germany on December 1, 1945.

== Demographics ==
Population of the Stuhm district
	1834		1837		1849		1855		1867	
Germans	12,903	46.5%	15,512	54.4%	18,941	54.6%	21,932	57.7%	23,555	58.2%
Poles	14,372	51,8%	13,024	45.6%	15,777	45.4%	16,104	42.3%	16,928	41.8%
Total	27,725		28,536		34,718		38,036		40,483	

== Municipalities ==
Prior to its dissolution in 1945, the district comprised two towns and 65 other municipalities:

- Altendorf
- Altmark
- Ankemitt
- Baalau
- Baumgarth
- Blonaken
- Bönhof
- Braunswalde
- Bruch
- Budisch
- Christburg (town)
- Deutsch Damerau
- Dietrichsdorf
- Georgensdorf
- Groß Brodsende
- Großwaplitz
- Grünhagen
- Güldenfelde
- Heinrode
- Hohendorf
- Honigfelde
- Iggeln
- Jordansdorf
- Kalsen
- Kalwe
- Kammerau
- Kiesling
- Klein Brodsende
- Konradswalde
- Laabe
- Laase
- Lichtfelde
- Losendorf
- Mahlau
- Menthen
- Mirahnen
- Montauerweide
- Morainen
- Neudorf
- Neuhöferfelde
- Neumark
- Neunhuben
- Niklaskirchen
- Pestlin
- Peterswalde
- Pirklitz
- Polixen
- Portschweiten
- Posilge
- Preußisch Damerau
- Ramten
- Rehhof
- Rudnerweide
- Sadlacken
- Schönwiese
- Schroop
- Stangenberg
- Stuhm (town)
- Teschendorf
- Tiefensee
- Tragheimerweide
- Trankwitz
- Troop
- Usnitz
- Wadkeim
- Wargels
- Weißenberg

=== Place names ===
In some cases, place names that were considered "not German" enough in the 1930s received phonetic alignment or translation:

- Barlewitz → Wargels
- Czewskawolla → Petersbruch
- Jordanken → Jordansdorf
- Kollosomp → Kalsen
- Kommerau → Kammerau
- Mlecewo → Heinrode
- Nikolaiken → Niklaskirchen
- Sadluken → Sadlacken
- Straszewo → Dietrichsdorf
- Watkowitz → Wadkeim
