= Stanisław Maroński =

Polish educator and historian

Stanisław Maroński (1825–1907) was a Polish educator and historian.

== Publications (selection) ==
- (in German) Die stammesverwandtschaftlichen und politischen Beziehungen Pommerns zu Polen, bis zum Ende der ersten polnischen Herrschaft in Pommerellen, im Jahre 1227. Neustadt i. W. 1866
- De auguribus Romanis commentationis pars prior. Neustadt/Wpr.()
- Herodot's Gelonen keine preussisch-litauische Völkerschaft
- Jan Łaski, prymas, jako obrońca interesów narodowych w walce z polityką Zakonu krzyżackiego w Polsce
- Pieśń o narodzie cierpienia / Stanisław Maroński. - Gniezno, 1848.
