= Theodor von Schön =

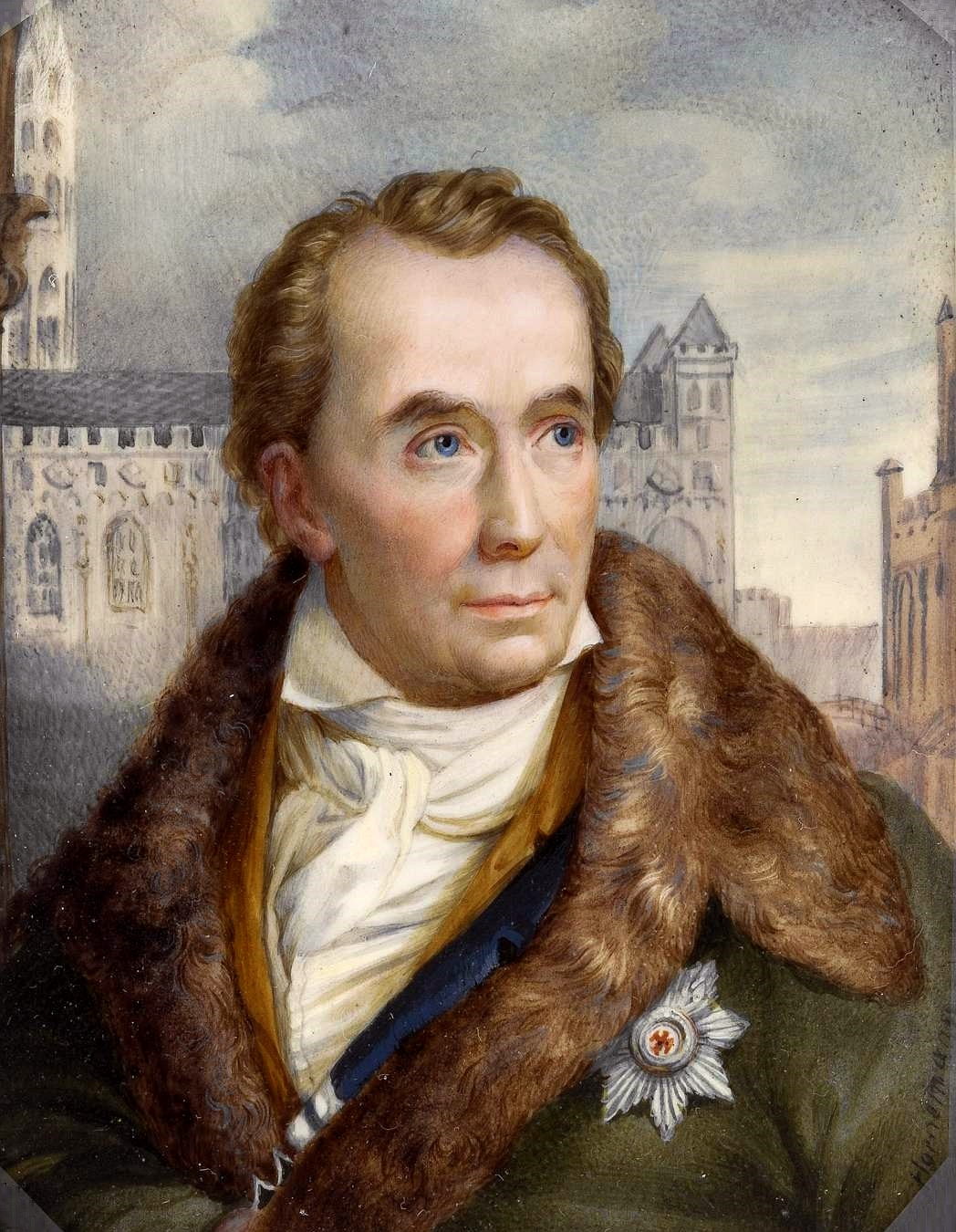

Heinrich Theodor von Schön (20 January 1773 – 23 July 1856) was a Prussian statesman who assisted in the liberal reforms in Prussia during the Napoleonic Wars.

== Biography ==
Schön was born in Schreitlauken, Tilsit district, East Prussia (now Šereitlaukis, Pagėgiai Municipality, Lithuania). He studied law and political science at the University of Königsberg. In 1793, he entered the Prussian government service and was rapidly promoted. After the Peace of Tilsit (1807), he served as the regional governor of Regierungsbezirk Gumbinnen from 1809 to 1815. He rendered assistance in carrying out the reforms of Baron vom Stein and Karl August von Hardenberg, and to him is attributed the authorship of the Politisches Testament, which Stein issued upon his retirement from office. In addition, Schön's memorandum on the abolition of serfdom was the basis of the law of emancipation.

In May 1815, Schön was appointed Oberpräsident of the province of West Prussia. Eight years later in 1824, he was also appointed to lead East Prussia in personal union and, after they were formally merged to form a united Province of Prussia, he continued as the Oberpräsident of the province until 1842. Under his administration, many reforms were made. He was an ardent liberal, and it was partly through his efforts that upon the accession of the new king in 1840, a demand was made for a constitution. Schön was made minister of state, but his ideas were too advanced for Frederick William IV, and he found it expedient in 1842 to retire from political life. He was buried next to the Arnau Church in East Prussia.

Schön's memoirs and correspondence were published by his son under the title of Aus den Papieren des Ministers und Burggrafen von Marienburg Theodor von Schön (1875–83). The share claimed by him in Stein's reforms has been the subject of some controversy.
