= Kreis Dirschau =

Former district of Prussia

- District of Prussia
- 1772–1920
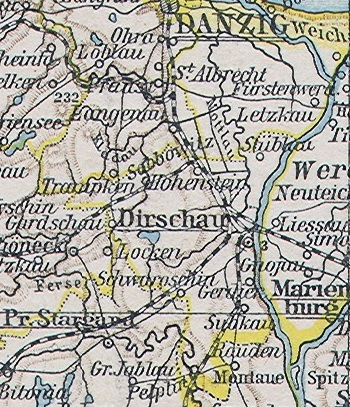
- A map of the district by Richard Andree, 1890
- Capital: Dirschau (Tczew)
- History
  - Established: 1772
  - Disestablished: 1920
- Today part of: Poland

Kreis Dirschau was a Prussian district which existed with varying borders from 1772 to 1818 and from 1887 to 1920. In 1920, following World War I the district was ceded by the German Empire partly to Poland and partly to the Free City of Danzig in accordance Treaty of Versailles. From 1939 to 1945 the district in occupied Poland was re-established as part of the wartime Reichsgau Danzig-West Prussia. Today the former district is in the Polish Pomeranian Voivodeship.

== History ==
=== Kreis Dirschau from 1772 to 1818 ===
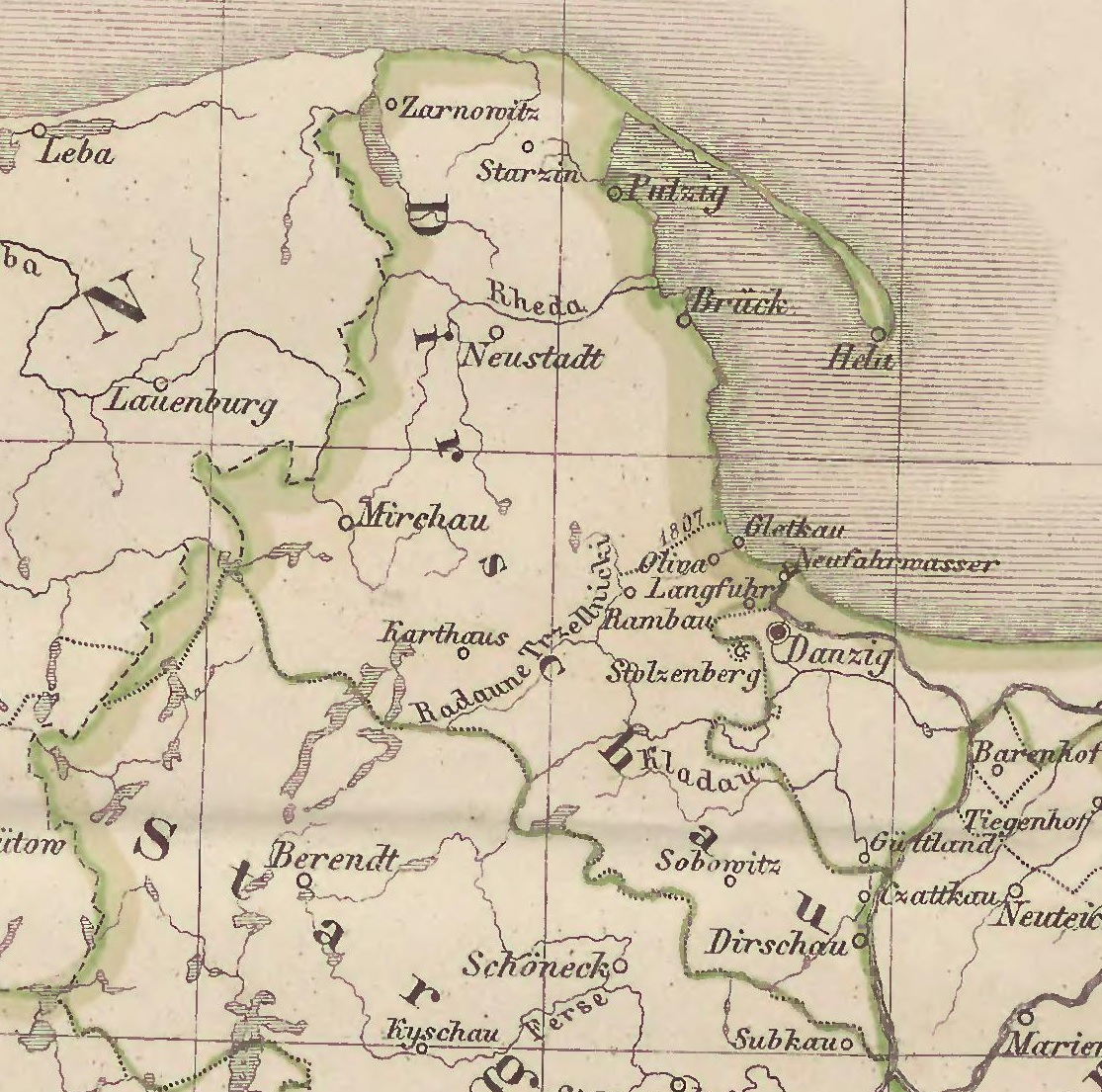
Kreis Dirschau from 1772 to 1818

West Prussia became part of the Kingdom of Prussia through the First Partition of Poland in 1772 and was initially divided into six large districts, including the Dirschau district. The northern part of Pomerelia with the towns of Dirschau, Neustadt, Putzig and Stolzenberg were part of the Dirschau district.

The Prussian provincial authorities ordinance of 30 April 1815 and its implementing provisions made the area part of Regierungsbezirk Danzig in the province of West Prussia. With a comprehensive district reform, new smaller districts were formed on 1 April 1818. The area of the old Dirschau district was incorporated into the newly formed Karthaus, Danzig, Neustadt and Stargard districts.

=== Kreis Dirschau from 1887 to 1920 ===
The continuous growth of the population prompted a district reform in West Prussia. In October 1887, the new Dirschau district was created, consisting of parts of the Danzig district and the Preußisch Stargard district. The seat of the district office and the only town in the district was Dirschau (today Tczew). The district had a German majority and a significant Polish minority.

Due to the provisions of the Versailles Treaty, the Dirschau district was ceded by the German Reich on 10 January 1920. The largest part of the district with the city of Dirschau was transferred to Poland and continued as Powiat Tczewski. Several parishes in the north of the district were ceded to the Free City of Danzig and were incorporated into the Danziger Höhe district.

The communities in the Marienwerder district, which were transferred to Poland in 1920, were largely incorporated into the Powiat Tczewski on 1 April 1932. They had previously formed the Polish Powiat Gniewski from 1924, based in Gniew.

=== Kreis Dirschau in occupied Poland (1939-1945) ===
After the German Invasion of Poland and the subsequent annexation of the district area in violation of international law, the district was re-established as part of Reichsgau Danzig-West Prussia from 1939 to 1945. In November 1939, Germans carried out executions of numerous Poles from Tczew, including local teachers, officials (including pre-war mayor Karol Hempel), craftsmen, a policeman, and even a seventeen-year-old student. From 1939 to 1941, the Einsatzgruppe operated a penal forced labour camp in Tczew.

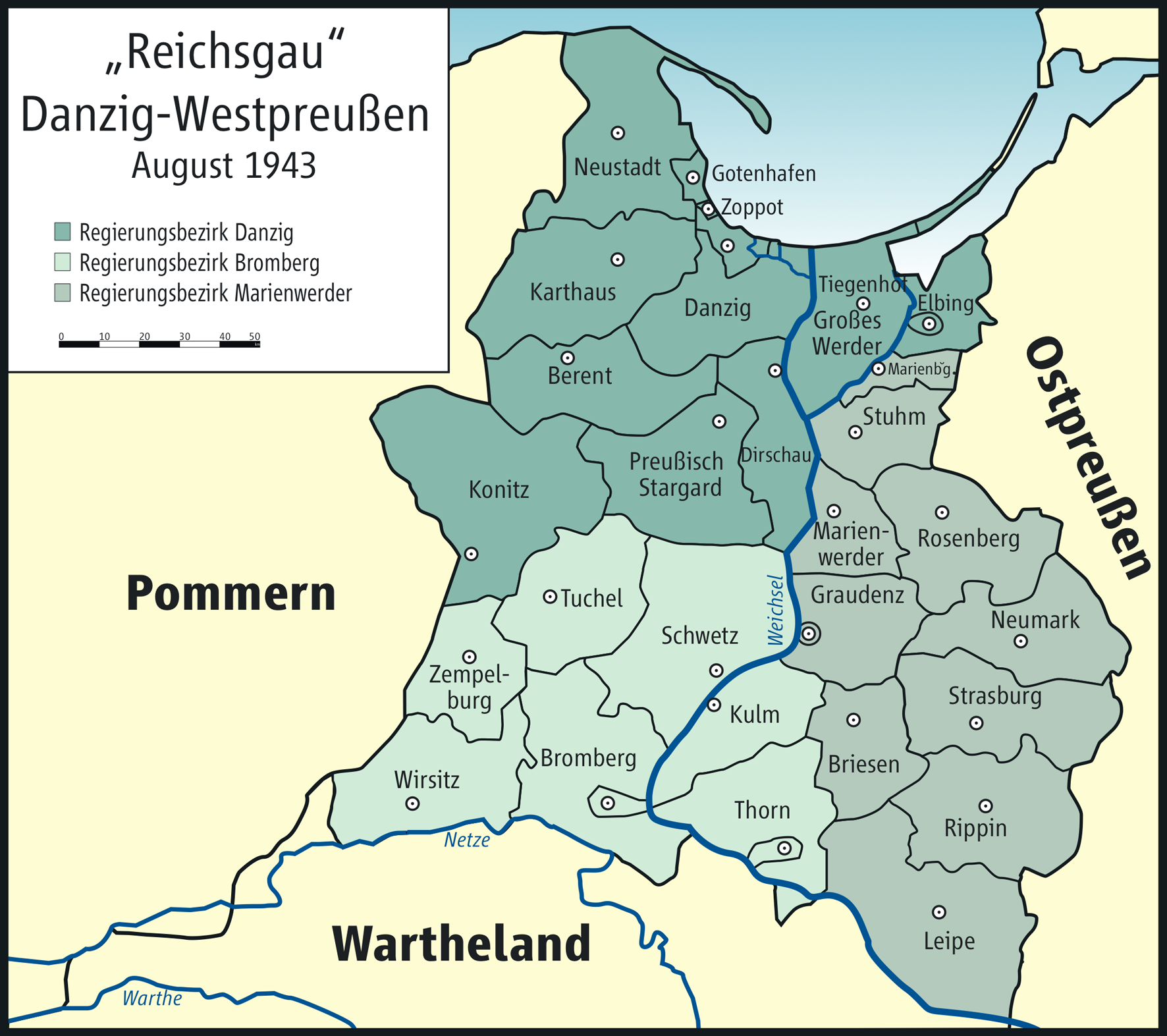
Reichsgau Danzig-West Prussia

In the spring of 1945 the Red Army occupied the district, which was then restored to Poland. In the following years, most of the German inhabitants were expelled.

== Demographics ==
Ethnolinguistic structure in Kreis Dirschau
Year	Population	German		Polish / Bilingual / Other	
1905	40,856	25,466	62.3%	15,390	37.7%
1910	42,723	27,865	65.2%	14,858	34.8%
