= Marienwerder (region) =

Governmental district of Prussia from 1815 to 1945

Administrative regions of West Prussia: Regierungsbezirk Danzig Regierungsbezirk Marienwerder

The Marienwerder Region (German: Regierungsbezirk Marienwerder) was a government region (Regierungsbezirk) of Prussia from 1815 until 1920 and again 1939–1945. It was a part of the province of West Prussia from 1815 to 1829, and again 1878–1920, belonging to the Province of Prussia in the intervening years, and to the Reichsgau Danzig-West Prussia in the years 1939–1945. The regional capital was Marienwerder in West Prussia (now Kwidzyn).

== History ==
Most of Polish Royal Prussia was annexed by King Frederick the Great of Prussia in the 1772 First Partition of Poland. The town of Marienwerder, previously in Ducal Prussia, became an administrative capital of the newly acquired territory, which became the province of West Prussia on 31 January 1773.

West Prussia was divided into the regions of Danzig and Marienwerder in 1815, following the Napoleonic Wars. While the governor and provincial authorities were based in Danzig (Gdańsk), the provincial supreme court of Marienwerder (1772–1943) was in the homonymous town.

From 1815 to 1818, West Prussia was reorganised into districts (or Kreise), within each government region. The Marienwerder Region included the rural districts (Kreise) of Culm (1818–1920), Briesen (1887–1920), Deutsch-Krone (1772–1945), Flatow (1818–1945), Graudenz-Land (1818–1920), Konitz (1772–1920), Löbau in West Prussia (1818–1920), Marienwerder (1752–1945), Rosenberg in West Prussia (1818–1945), Schlochau (1818–1945), Schwetz (1818–1920), Strasburg in West Prussia (1818–1920), Stuhm (1818–1945), Thorn-Land (1818–1920), and Tuchel (1875–1920).

Up until 1920, the Marienwerder Region comprised the urban districts (Stadtkreise) of Graudenz (Grudziądz) and Thorn (Toruń), both established on 1 January 1900.

The Marienwerder Region was placed under an inter-Allied commission from 1920 to 1922 and was eventually divided, with the western districts included within the newly established Polish Republic as part of the so-called Polish Corridor. The eastern part of Marienwerder that voted to be incorporated within the Weimar Republic was named the Region of West Prussia (Regierungsbezirk Westpreußen) while it was joined to the Province of East Prussia from 1922 to 1939, after which the original Marienwerder Region was restored until its dissolution in 1945.

== Demographics ==
Regierungsbezirk Marienwerder had a majority German population, with a large Polish minority.

Ethnolinguistic Structure of Regierungsbezirk Marienwerder (1910)
District (Kreis)	Polish name	Population	German	%	Polish / Kashubian / Bilingual	%
Briesen	Wąbrzeźno	49,506	24,007	48.5%	25,487	51.5%
Culm	Chełmno	50,069	23,345	46.6%	26,709	53.3%
Deutsch Krone	Wałcz	62,182	61,143	98.3%	1,022	1.6%
Flatow	Złotów	69,186	50,648	73.2%	18,531	26.8%
Landkreis Graudenz	Grudziądz	48,818	28,755	58.9%	20,046	41.1%
Stadtkreis Graudenz	Grudziądz	40,325	34,193	84.8%	6,076	15.1%
Konitz	Chojnice	63,723	28,032	44.0%	35,670	56.0%
Löbau	Lubawa	59,037	12,119	20.5%	46,911	79.5%
Marienwerder	Kwidzyn	68,426	42,465	62.1%	25,944	37.9%
Rosenberg	Susz	54,550	50,194	92.0%	4,321	7.9%
Schlochau	Człuchów	67,157	56,648	84.4%	10,488	15.6%
Schwetz	Świecie	89,712	42,233	47.1%	47,465	52.9%
Strasburg	Brodnica	62,142	21,097	33.9%	41,026	66.0%
Stuhm	Sztum	36,527	20,923	57.3%	15,583	42.7%
Landkreis Thorn	Toruń	59,317	27,751	46.8%	31,493	53.1%
Stadtkreis Thorn	Toruń	46,227	30,505	66.0%	15,576	33.7%
Tuchel	Tuchola	33,951	11,265	33.2%	22,656	66.7%
Total	-	960,855	565,323	58.8%	395,004	41.1%

== Districts 1818 to 1920 ==
=== Urban districts ===
1. Thorn (1900–1920; 1939–1945), disentangled from Thorn District
2. Graudenz (1900–1920; 1939–1945), disentangled from Graudenz District

=== Rural districts ===
1. Culm (1818–1920; 1939–1945), based in Culm upon Vistula
2. Briesen (1887–1920; 1939–1945), based in Briesen in West Prussia
3. Deutsch-Krone (1772–1945), based in Deutsch-Krone
4. Flatow (1818–1945), based in Flatow
5. Graudenz[-Land (as of 1900)] (1818–1920), based in Graudenz
6. Konitz (1772–1920; 1939–1945), based in Konitz
7. Löbau (1818–1920; 1939–1945), based in Löbau in West Prussia
8. Marienwerder (1752–1945), based in Marienwerder in West Prussia
9. Rosenberg (1818–1945), based in Rosenberg in West Prussia
10. Schlochau (1818–1945), based in Schlochau
11. Schwetz (1818–1920), based in Schwetz
12. Strasburg in West Prussia (1818–1920; 1939–1945), based in Strasburg in West Prussia
13. Stuhm (1818–1945), based in Stuhm
14. Thorn[-Land (as of 1900)] (1818–1920; 1939–1945), based in Thorn
15. Tuchel (1875–1920; 1939–1945), based in Tuchel

== Regional presidents ==
Each of the nineteen Regierungsbezirke featured a non-legislative governing body called a Regierungspräsidium or Bezirksregierung (regional government) headed by a Regierungspräsident (regional president), concerned mostly with applying state law to administrative decisions on municipalities within their jurisdiction and their umbrella organisations (the districts).

- 1814–1823 : Theodor Gottlieb von Hippel the Younger (1775–1843)
- 1823–1825 : Johann Carl Rothe (1771–1853)
- 1825–1830 : Eduard von Flottwell (1786–1865)
- 1830–1850 : Jakob von Nordenflycht (1785–1854)
- 1850–1875 : Botho Heinrich zu Eulenburg (1804–1879)
- 1875–1881 : Adalbert von Flottwell (1829–1909)
- 1881–1891 : Christian Julius von Massenbach (1832–1904)
- 1891–1901 : Karl Heinrich Ludwig von Horn (1833–1911)
- 1901–1905 : Ernst Ludwig von Jagow (1853–1930)
- 1905–1920 : Karl Schilling (1858–1931)
- 1939–1945 : Otto von Keudell

== Literature ==
- (in German) Michael Rademacher: Deutsche Verwaltungsgeschichte Preußen, Provinz Westpreußen (2006)
- (in German) E. Jacobson: Topographisch-statistisches Handbuch für den Regierungsbezirk Marienwerder, Danzig 1868 (Online, Google).
