= West Prussia =

Province of Prussia (1772–1829, 1878–1919)

Province of West Prussia Provinz Westpreußen (German) Prusy Zachodnie (Polish)
- Province of Prussia
- 1773–1829; 1878–1919
- Flag (1886–1919) Coat of arms

- West Prussia (red), within the Kingdom of Prussia (blue), within the German Empire, as of 1878
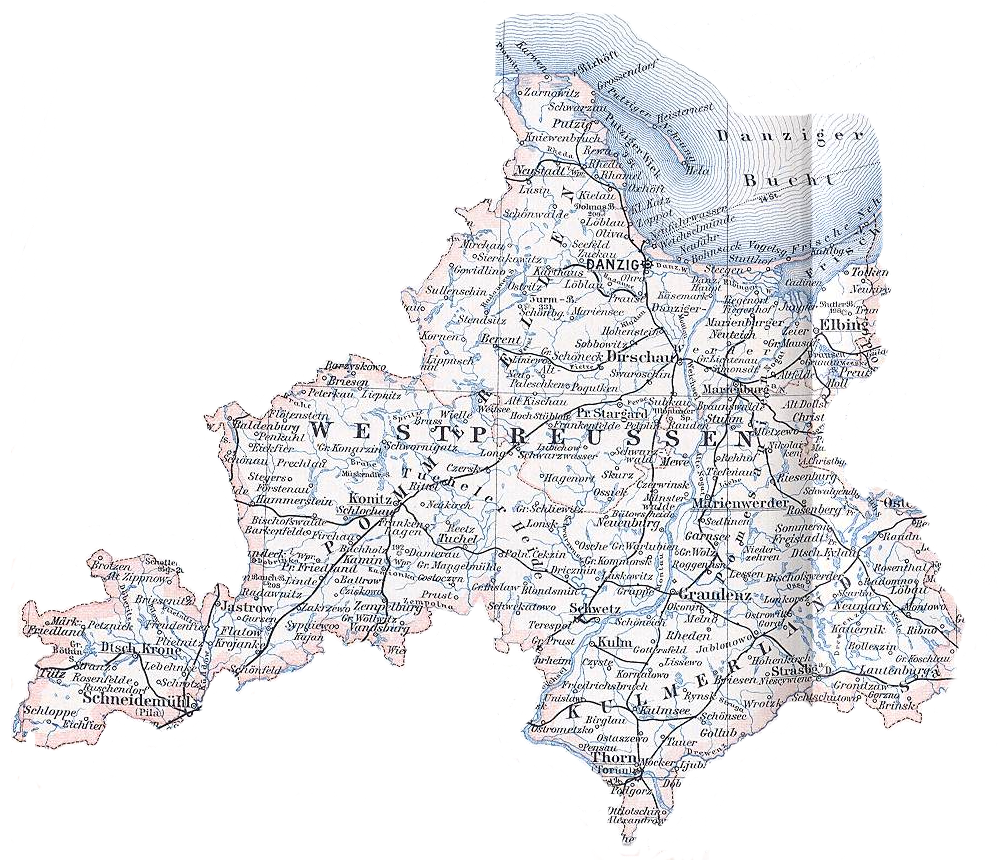
- West Prussia

Anthem
- Westpreußenlied "Song of West Prussia" (1878–1919)
- Capital: Marienwerder (1773–1793, 1806–1813); Danzig (1793–1806, 1813–1919)
- Demonym: West Prussian
- Area
  - 1910: 25,534 km^{2} (9,859 sq mi)
- Population
  - 1910: 1,703,474
- History
  - Established: 1773
  - Division by Napoleon: 1806
  - Restored: 1815
  - Province of Prussia: 1829–1878
  - Treaty of Versailles: 1919
  - Disestablished: 1919
- Political subdivisions: Danzig; Marienwerder
Preceded by
Royal Prussia
Duchy of Warsaw
Free City of Danzig (Napoleonic)
Province of Prussia
Succeeded by
Duchy of Warsaw
Free City of Danzig (Napoleonic)
Province of Prussia
Pomeranian Voivodeship (1919–1939)
Free City of Danzig
Region of West Prussia
Posen-West Prussia
- Today part of: Poland

The Province of West Prussia (German: Provinz Westpreußen; Kashubian: Zôpadné Prësë; Polish: Prusy Zachodnie) was a province of Prussia from 1773 to 1829 and from 1878 to 1919. West Prussia was established as a province of the Kingdom of Prussia in 1773, formed from Royal Prussia following its annexation in the First Partition of Poland. West Prussia was merged with East Prussia in 1829 to form the Province of Prussia, then re-established in 1878 when the merger was reversed under the German Empire. West Prussia was a province of the Free State of Prussia within Weimar Germany in 1918–1919, but it lost most of its territory to the Second Polish Republic and the Free City of Danzig under the Treaty of Versailles. It was therefore dissolved in 1919, with its remaining western territory merging with Posen to form the Prussian Province Posen–West Prussia. Its eastern territory became part of East Prussia as the Region of West Prussia.

West Prussia's provincial capital alternated between Marienwerder (present-day Kwidzyn, Poland) and Danzig (Gdańsk, Poland). It was notable for its ethnic and religious diversity due to immigration and cultural changes. In the early Middle Ages, the bulk of the region was inhabited by West Slavic Lechitic tribes, but the Teutonic Order's conquest of the region in the 14th century resulted in extensive German colonisation. As a result of Germanisation, Germans became the most numerous ethnic group in West Prussia by the middle of the 19th century, although their distribution was uneven. Poles and Kashubians made around 36% of the population of the province. The majority of Germans were Protestant, while most Poles were Catholic. There was also a significant Jewish minority.

== Geography ==
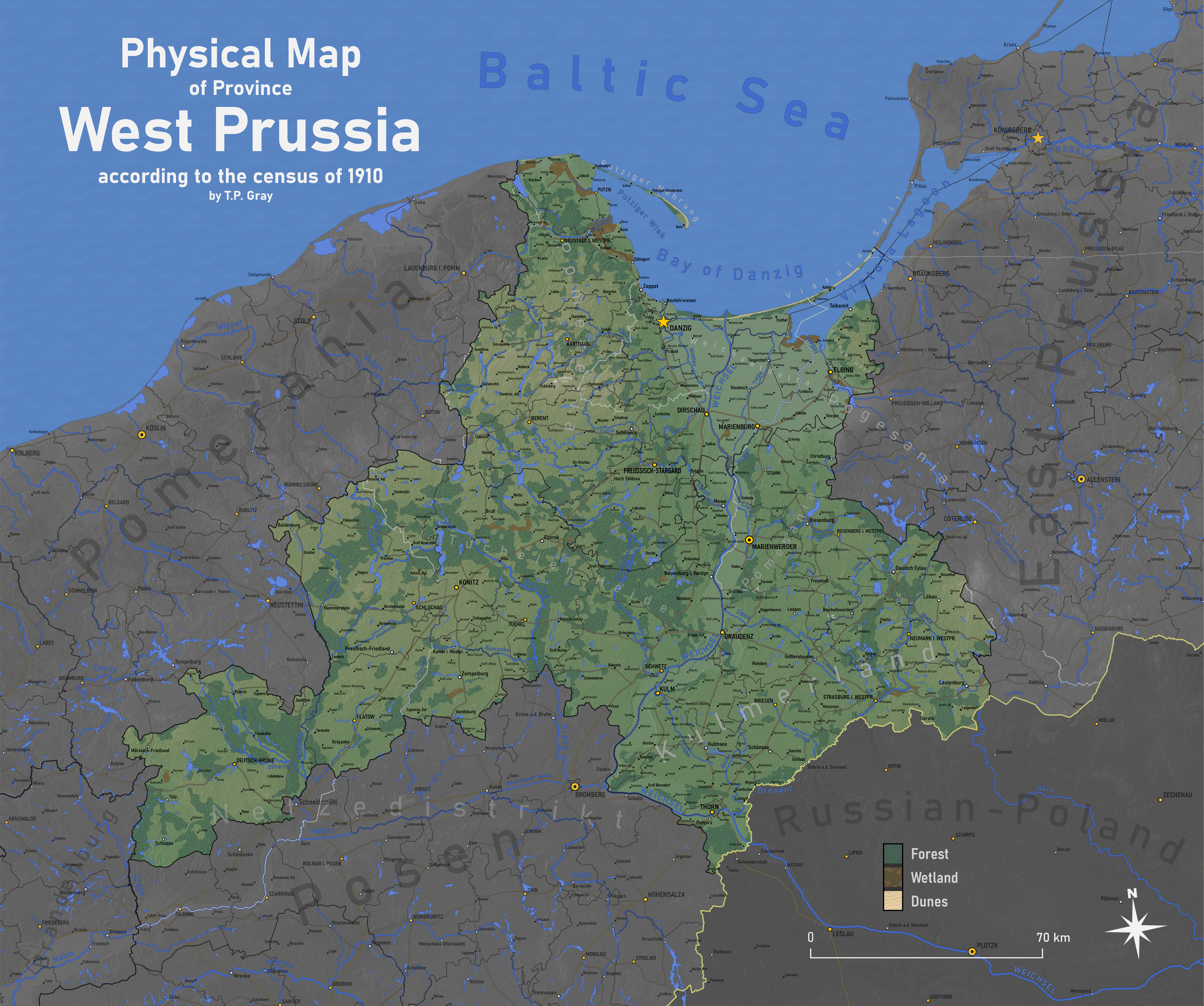
Physical map of West Prussia in the year 1910

The landscape of West Prussia consisted of the lower reaches of the Vistula River (German: Weichsel, Polish: Wisła) near its mouth at the Baltic Sea and neighbouring lands to the west and east.

In the west, the province shared a border with easternmost Brandenburg and comprised the lands between the provinces of Posen and Pomerania. This region of the province was characterized by the Baltic Uplands, with southward flowing rivers joining the Netze (Polish: Noteć). The Brahe (Polish: Brda) drained much of the area, joining the Vistula after passing through Bromberg (Polish: Bydgoszcz). Numerous large expanses of woodland, including the Tuchola Forest, were located in this part of the province. Farther north near the Baltic Sea is the Kashubian Lake District, where the highest point of the former province, Turmberg (Polish: Wieżyca), reached 329 meters above sea level. The headwaters of Pomeranian rivers such as the Stolpe (Polish: Słupia) and Leba (Polish: Łeba) were located in these uplands.

In the north is the Baltic coast, consisting of a graded shoreline with landmarks such as the Hel Peninsula stretching 35 kilometers into Gdańsk Bay and the Vistula Fens where the river meets the sea. The Vistula delta encompasses a heavily cultivated area of approximately 2,000 square kilometers of land, much of it below sea level. Danzig (Polish: Gdańsk), the largest city of the province, was founded at the northwestern end of the delta. The Nogat river, a distributary of the Vistula, flows to the northeast past the city of Marienburg (Polish: Malbork) and into the Vistula Lagoon. Farther east near Elbing (Polish: Elbląg), the border with East Prussia crossed the Vistula Spit, Vistula Lagoon, and the Elbląg Upland.

In the southeast, the course of the Vistula River forms a wide, flat plain, with adjacent escarpments sometimes exceeding 60 meters in height above the river valley. The area included the fertile Culmerland (Chełmno Land), with historic cities such as Culm (Polish: Chełmno), Thorn (Polish: Toruń), and Graudenz (Polish: Grudziądz). The Culmerland stretched eastward to the border with East Prussia, partially bounded on the south by the path of the river Drewenz (Polish: Drwęca), which formed part of the province's southeastern border with Congress Poland and the Russian Empire.

== History ==
=== Pre-provincial period ===
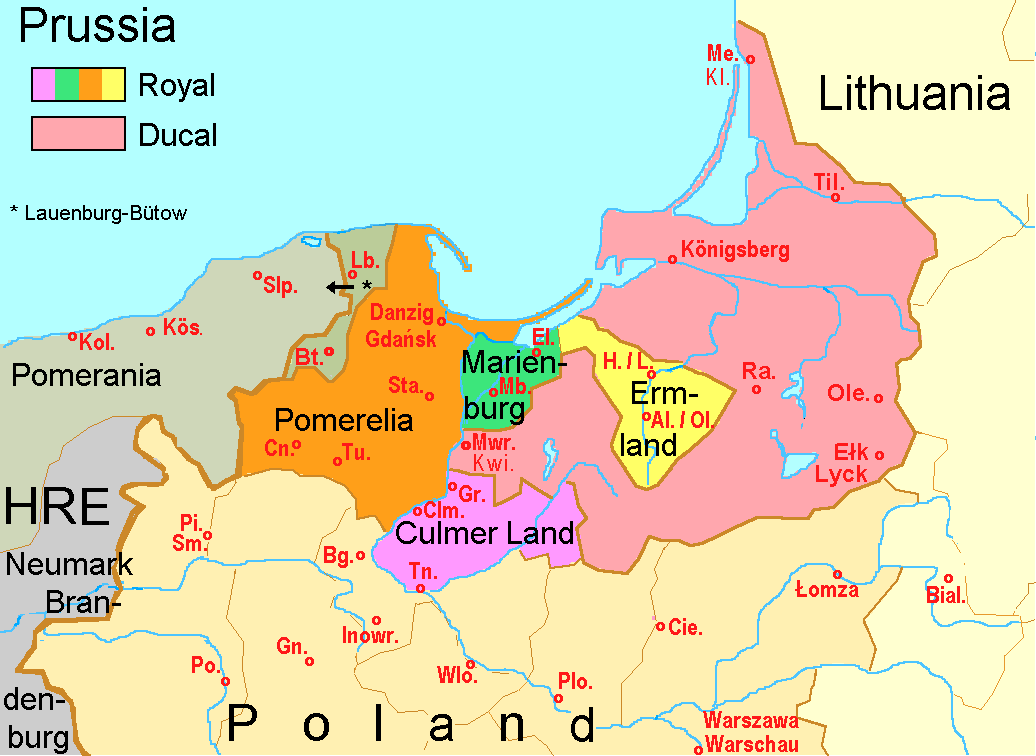
Royal and Ducal Prussia in 1525

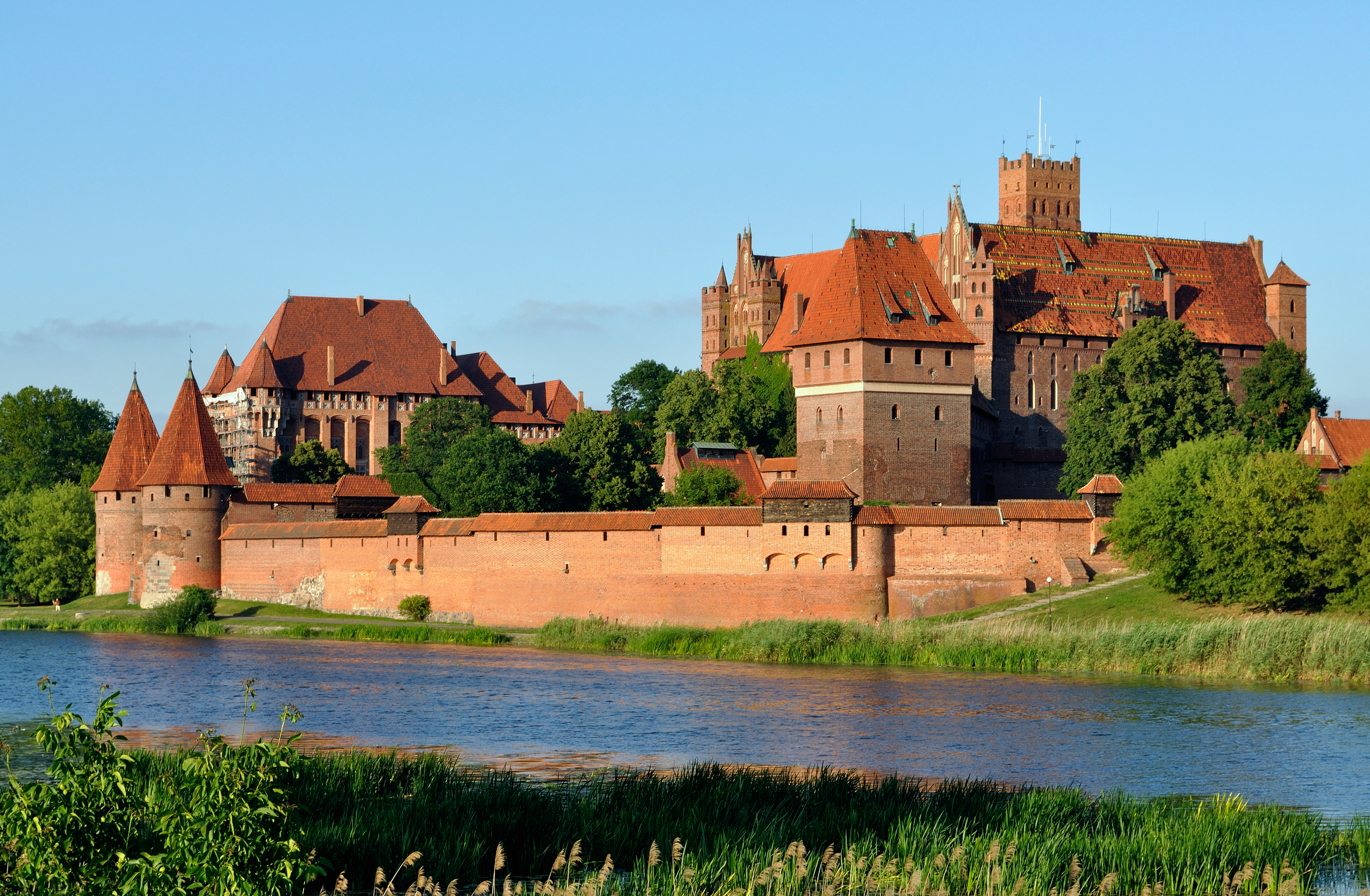
The fortress Ordensburg Marienburg in Malbork, Poland. Founded in 1274 by the Teutonic Order on the river Nogat, it is the world's largest brick castle. It served as one of several royal residences of the Polish kings from 1466 until 1772.

In 1308 the Polish King Ladislaus the Short requested help from Heinrich of Plötzke of the Teutonic Order against Waldemar, Margrave of Brandenburg-Stendal, in a dispute over the historically Polish region of Pomerelia, (also known as Gdańsk Pomerania). Heinrich not only drove the Brandenburgians out of Danzig but went on to occupy the rest of Pomerelia and made it part of the State of the Teutonic Order. In the takeover of Danzig, Heinrich's men destroyed much of the city and killed a large, although still disputed, number of the city's inhabitants. The possession of Danzig and Pomerelia by the Teutonic Order was questioned by the Polish kings Ladislaus and Casimir the Great in legal suits at the papal court in 1320 and 1333. Both times, and also in 1339, the Teutonic Order was ordered by the Pope to return Pomerelia and other of their lands to Poland, but they did not comply.

The events set the stage for a series of Polish–Teutonic Wars during the 14th and 15th centuries. Under Teutonic rule, western, mainly German-speaking farmers, traders and craftsmen were encouraged to settle in the region. In 1454 the Prussian Confederation, made up of representatives of the Prussian estates, sought to break away from the Teutonic Order and join Poland, leading to the outbreak of the Thirteen Years' War. It was settled by the Second Peace of Thorn, under which Poland acquired most of the region and thenceforth formed Royal Prussia. It consisted of Pomerelia and Chełmno Land, expanded by the addition of parts of the formerly Old Prussian territories of Pomesania, Pogesania and Warmia. The region initially had a degree of autonomy with its own local legislature called the Prussian Estates, and it maintained its own laws, customs and rights. Royal Prussia was ultimately re-absorbed into the Crown of the Kingdom of Poland following the Union of Lublin in 1569.

The locally spoken language differed among social classes. The aristocracy and urban burghers were initially highly Germanised as a result of earlier Teutonic policies, but they were gradually Polonised in the later years. The peasantry continued to speak predominantly Kashubian and Polish.

East Prussia around Königsberg remained part of the State of the Teutonic Order, which was reduced to a vassal state of the Polish kings. Its territory was secularised to become the Lutheran Duchy of Prussia under the 1525 Treaty of Kraków and the Prussian Homage. Beginning in 1618, the duchy was ruled in personal union with the Imperial Margraviate of Brandenburg. The Hohenzollern rulers of Brandenburg-Prussia were able to remove Polish suzerainty in the 1657 Treaty of Wehlau. In 1701, under Holy Roman Emperor Leopold I, the duchy was elevated to the Kingdom of Prussia.

=== Establishment ===
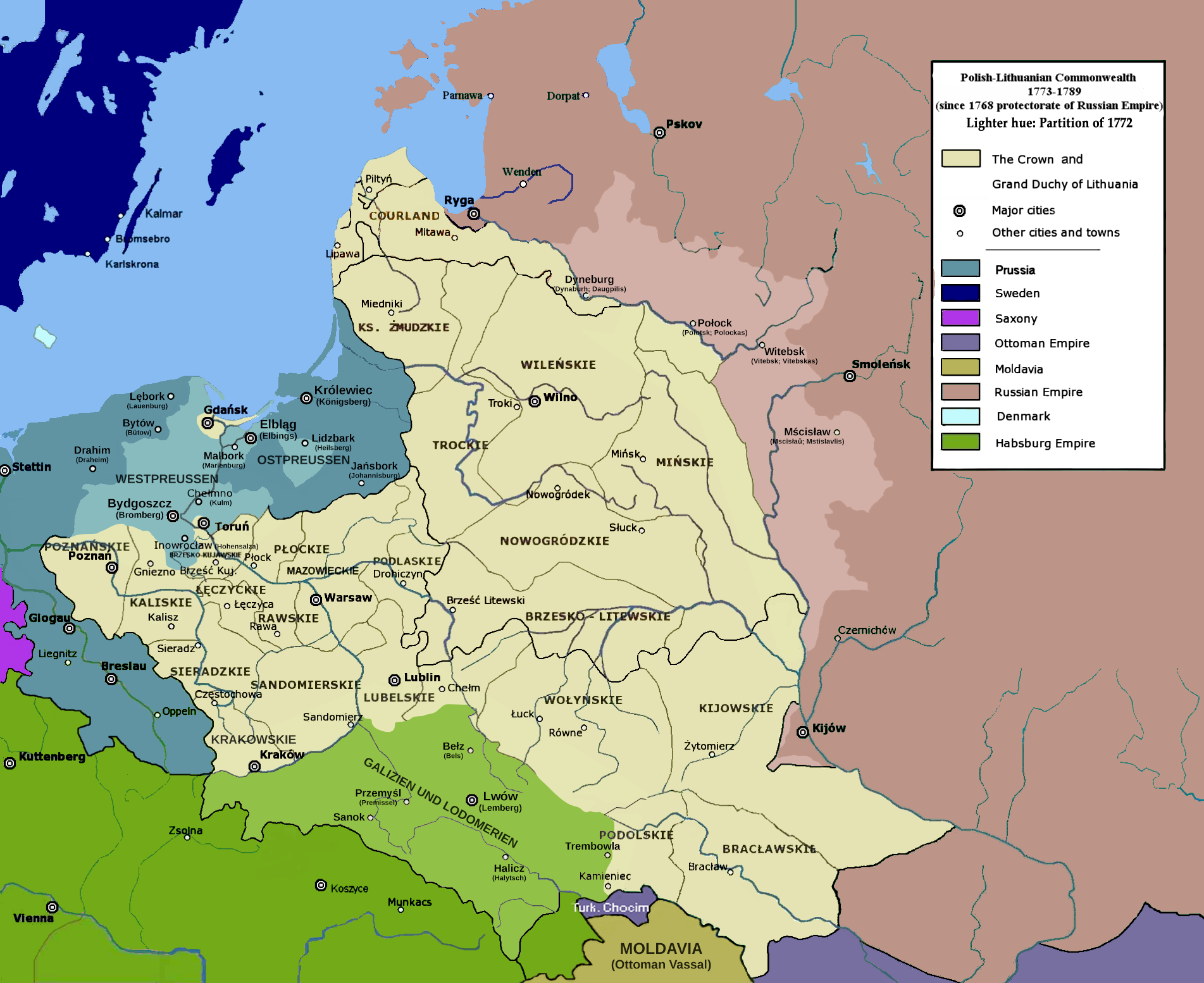
West Prussia following the First Partition of Poland. It is the lighter shaded part of the Kingdom of Prussia along the Baltic coastline.

In 1772 the Prussian king Frederick II (Frederick the Great) arranged for the Russian Empire to annex the eastern part of the weak and divided Polish–Lithuanian Commonwealth and for Prussia to take most of Royal Prussia. The resulting First Partition of Poland gave Prussia a land connection between the Province of Pomerania and East Prussia, cutting off Polish access to the Baltic Sea. The annexed provinces of Pomerania (Pomerelia), excluding Danzig, plus Malbork (Marienburg) and Chełmno (Culm), excluding the city of Toruń (Thorn), were incorporated into the new Province of West Prussia the following year, as was the formerly East Prussian Marienwerder Kreis. Warmia (Ermland) became part of East Prussia, while the annexed parts of Greater Poland and Kuyavia formed a separate Netze District located to the south. German-speaking Protestants made up 54% of the annexed area and 75% of the urban population.

The Partition Sejm, a puppet legislature created for the purpose, ratified the cession on 30 September 1773, and at the same time the Polish king renounced his title to Prussia. Thereafter, Frederick held the title "King of Prussia" rather than "King in Prussia", which had been the case when West Prussia was part of Poland.

Danzig and Thorn became part of West Prussia in the Second Partition of Poland in 1793.

Following the partitions, Prussian systems replaced the Polish administrative and legal code in West Prussia. From 1772 to 1775, 750 schools were built in the province. Teachers and administrators, who were both Protestant and Roman Catholic, were encouraged to be able to speak both German and Polish. Frederick II advised his successors to learn Polish, a policy followed by the Hohenzollern dynasty until Frederick III (r. 1888) decided not to have his son William II (r. 1888–1914) learn the language. Despite his encouragement of bilingualism, Frederick II had little but contempt for the Polish nobility (szlachta), and wrote that Poland had "the worst government in Europe with the exception of the Ottoman Empire". In a letter to his brother Henry, Frederick said of the province that "there is a lot of work to be done; there is no order and no planning, and the towns are in a lamentable condition". Frederick invited German immigrants to redevelop the province, with some 300,000 answering the call.

Even though some German authors viewed the establishment of West Prussia as a historic reunification of the lands of the Teutonic State, the Prussian government officially avoided justifying the annexation with such an argument. The reason was that the Teutonic Order still called for the reestablishment of its rule over East and West Prussia.

=== Napoleonic Wars and Congress of Vienna ===
In 1806, armies of the French Empire under Napoleon defeated Prussia at the Battle of Jena–Auerstedt. In the resulting Treaties of Tilsit, West Prussia lost its southern territory around Thorn and Culm to the short-lived Duchy of Warsaw; it also lost Danzig, which was a Free City from 1807 until 1814. After Napoleon's final defeat in 1815, Danzig, Culm and Thorn were returned to West Prussia by the Congress of Vienna. Some areas of Greater Poland annexed in 1772 that had formed the Netze District were added to West Prussia as well; the remainder became part of the Grand Duchy of Posen.

The Congress of Vienna also established the German Confederation, an association of 39 German-speaking states under the nominal leadership of the Austrian Empire as a replacement for the dissolved Holy Roman Empire. With the exception of the Lauenburg and Bütow Land and the former Starostwo of Draheim, the Prussian lands which had been outside the Empire (former Ducal Prussia and those territories gained during the partitions of Poland) were not part of the Confederation. They included both predominantly Polish- or Kashubian-speaking areas (former Greater Poland and Pomerelia within West Prussia and the Grand Duchy of Posen) and German-speaking areas (Malbork Land within West Prussia and most of East Prussia). The Frankfurt Parliament planned to include these regions in a unified Germany during the failed German revolutions of 1848–1849.

In 1815, the province was administratively subdivided into the governmental districts (Regierungsbezirke) of Danzig and Marienwerder. West Prussia was joined with East Prussia in personal union under a single Oberpräsident in 1824, then in 1829 the two provinces were officially combined to form the Province of Prussia within the Kingdom of Prussia.

=== Incorporation into Germany ===
The entire Province of Prussia, including those parts that had not belonged to the German Confederation, became part of the North German Confederation in 1866 when it superseded the German Confederation. In 1878, seven years after the formation of the German Empire, East and West Prussia were separated to once again become provinces of the Kingdom of Prussia, the largest state within the new empire.

With rise of nationalism, the Hohenzollern-ruled Kingdom of Prussia increasingly became a target of aggressive Germanisation efforts, German settlement, anti-Catholic campaigns (the Kulturkampf), as well as disfranchisement and expropriations of Poles. Germany "systematically Germanicised 'eastern' place names and public signs, fostered German cultural imperialism, and provided financial and other inducements for German farmers, officials, clergy, and teachers to settle and work in the east. After [Chancellor Otto von] Bismarck's fall in 1890, Kaiser Wilhelm II actively encouraged all this."

Historian Andrzej Chwalba cites additional Germanisation measures that included:

- Ethnic Germans were favoured in government contracts, winning them over Poles.
- Ethnic Germans were promoted in investment plans and supply contracts.
- German craftsmen in Polish territories received the best locations in cities from the authorities so that they could start their own businesses and prosper.
- Under the threat of arrest, soldiers received orders that banned them from buying in Polish shops and from Poles.
- German merchants were encouraged to settle in Polish territories.
- Tax incentives and beneficial financial arrangements were proposed to German officials and clerks if they would settle in Polish-inhabited provinces.

In the German census of 1910, the population of West Prussia was set at 1,703,474, of whom 64.5% were German and the remainder (35.5%) Polish. Polish author Stanislas Kozicki wrote in 1918 that the true share of Poles may have been 42.5% because "a number of Polish Catholics have been inscribed as German". The numbers included German military personnel stationed in the region as well as civil clerks and officials who were settled as part of the German state's official policy of Germanisation of Polish areas.

=== Dissolution ===
Division of West Prussia, 1920. Yellow shades - Free City of Danzig; Red/orange - Second Polish Republic; Blue - Prussia (Weimar Republic); Purple - Marienwerder plebiscite area of East Prussia

The Treaty of Versailles, which ended the state of war between Germany and most of the Allied Powers after World War I, divided West Prussia into four areas as part as the restoration of Poland. The region around Danzig became a free city under the oversight of the League of Nations; the districts farthest to the east were made part of the Province of East Prussia as the administrative district of West Prussia with its seat at Marienwerder; the westernmost districts became part of the Province of Posen–West Prussia in 1922; and the central region was granted to the new Polish state as the Pomeranian Voivodeship, also referred to as the Polish Corridor.

The 1920 East Prussian plebiscite, a vote mandated by the Treaty of Versailles to allow certain mixed Polish and German areas of Prussia to decide whether to become part of Poland or to remain in Germany, included the eastern part of West Prussia. The Marienwerder plebiscite area included, partially or fully, the districts of Marienwerder, Stuhm, Rosenberg and Marienburg. The residents of the region voted by a majority of 92.4% to remain with Germany.

The majority of German speakers in the non-plebescite regions that had been ceded to Poland moved west into areas that still belonged to Prussia and Germany. Under Article 91 of the Treaty of Versailles, all German nationals who were resident in those regions before 1 January 1908 automatically became Polish citizens, although within two years of the treaty's effective date they could opt for German nationality. Many of those affected thought that the option was a referendum on whether their region should be part of Germany or of Poland rather than a personal choice. The new Polish government's strict policy regarding minorities led to well over half of German speakers in the regions of Posen and West Prussia that had become part of Poland to emigrate.

Division of the province between Poland, Weimar Germany and the Free City of Danzig after World War I
West Prussia	Area in 1910 in km^{2}	Share of territory	Population in 1910	After WW1 part of:	Notes
Given to:	25,580 km^{2}	100%	1,703,474	Divided between:	
Poland	15,900 km^{2}	62%	57%	Pomeranian Voivodeship	(Note: Poland received several cities and counties of West Prussia located east of the Vistula: Lubawa, Brodnica, Wąbrzeźno, Toruń, Chełmno, Grudziądz; as well as most of cities and counties of West Prussia located west of it: Świecie, Tuchola, Starogard Gdański, Kwidzyn (only part west of the Vistula), most of county Tczew, eastern part of county Złotów, part of county Człuchów, as well as counties Chojnice, Kościerzyna, Kartuzy, coastal Wejherowo and Puck with Gdynia; as well as a small western part of Danziger Höhe and areas around Janowo east of the Vistula.)
Free City Danzig	1,966 km^{2}	8%	19%	Free City of Danzig	
Germany	2,927 km^{2}	11%	15%	East Prussia	(Note: Parts of West Prussia east of the Nogat and the Vistula Rivers, which remained in Germany after 1918, including the city and county of Elbląg and counties Malbork (part east of Nogat), Sztum, Kwidzyn (only the part east of the Vistula) and Susz, were incorporated to East Prussia as the Regency of West Prussia. The area of historical Pomesania had significant Polish minority.)
Germany	4,787 km^{2}	19%	9%	Posen-West Prussia	(Note: Western part of West Prussia with county Wałcz and parts of counties Złotów and Człuchów (the latter two split between Poland and Germany). This area included 12 towns and cities: Człuchów, Debrzno, Biały Bór, Czarne, Lędyczek, Złotów, Krajenka, Wałcz, Mirosławiec, Człopa, Tuczno and Jastrowie. The area was home to significant Polish minority.)

=== World War II ===
Following Nazi Germany's 1939 invasion of Poland, the region which had been the Province of West Prussia became part of the Reichsgau Danzig-West Prussia. Some 130,000 Germans were settled in the region, while between 120,000 and 170,000 Poles and Jews were removed through expulsion or enslavement, or were killed in extermination camps or massacred. As in all other Nazi-occupied areas, Poles and Jews were classified as Untermenschen by the German state, with the fate of many being slavery and extermination, the latter in particular during Intelligenzaktion Pommern massacres and in the Stutthof concentration camp.

Late in the war, many West Prussian Germans fled westward as the Red Army advanced. All of the areas occupied by Nazis were restored to Poland according to the post-war Potsdam Agreement in 1945, along with additional neighbouring areas of former Nazi Germany and areas that had been part of Germany before the war. The vast majority of the remaining German population of the region that had not fled was subsequently expelled westward. Many German civilians were deported to labuor camps like Vorkuta in the Soviet Union, where a large number of them perished or were later reported missing. In 1949, the refugees established the non-profit Landsmannschaft Westpreussen to represent West Prussians in the Federal Republic of Germany.

== Historical population ==
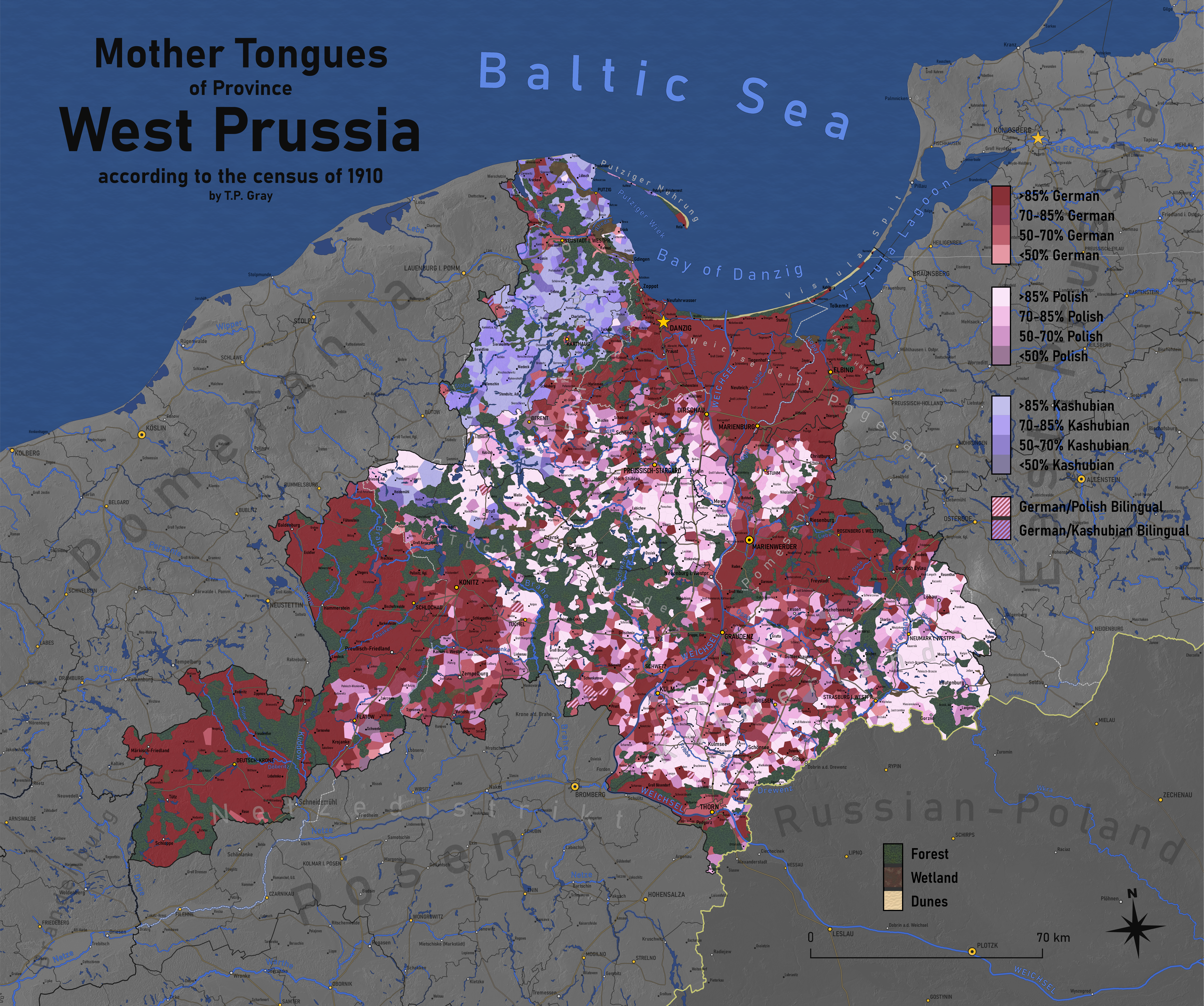
Mother tongues of West Prussia according to the 1910 census. Darker shades of red are predominantly German, pink to white are more strongly Polish, and blue is Kashubian.

Religious confessions of West Prussia according to the 1910 census. Blue shades are Protestant, pink Catholic, and dark green is largely uninhabited forest areas.

Perhaps the earliest estimations on ethnic or national structure of West Prussia are from 1819. At that time, West Prussia had 630,077 inhabitants, including 327,300 Poles (52%), 290,000 Germans (46%) and 12,700 Jews (2%).

Ethnic structure of West Prussia in 1819
Ethnic group	Population	
Ethnic group	Number	Percentage
Poles	327,300	52%
Germans	290,000	46%
Jews	12,700	2%
Total	630,077	100%

in 1831 geographer Karl Andree gave the total population of West Prussia as 700,000 – including 50% Poles (350,000), 47% Germans (330,000) and 3% Jews (20,000).

The population more than doubled during the next seven decades, reaching 1,433,681 inhabitants (including 1,976 foreigners) in 1890.

- 1875 – 1,343,057
- 1880 – 1,405,898
- 1890 – 1,433,681 (717,532 Catholics, 681,195 Protestants, 21,750 Jews, other)
- 1900 – 1,563,658 (800,395 Catholics, 730,685 Protestants, 18,226 Jews, other)
- 1905 – 1,641,936
- 1910 – 1,703,474 (according to German statistics, there were 35.5% Poles, while according to Polish statisticians the percentage of Poles was 42.5%)

According to the German census of 1910, in areas that became Polish after 1918, 42% of the populace was German (including German military, officials and colonists), while the Polish census of 1921 found 19% of Germans in the same territory.

Contemporary sources in the late 19th and early 20th centuries gave the number of Kashubians between 80,000 and 200,000.

== Subdivisions ==
Governmental districts of West Prussia with their Kreise (1910). Danzig is in red, Marienwereder in blue.

Languages within the administrative divisions of West Prussia according to the German census of 1910. German Polish Kashubian other or bilingual

Prussian provinces were subdivided into governmental districts called Regierungsbezirke. West Prussia had two: Danzig in the north and Marienwerder in the south. The governmental districts were further subdivided into Kreise. Cities had their own Stadtkreis (urban district), and the surrounding rural area was named for the city but referred to as a Landkreis (rural district).

Ethnolinguistic structure of West Prussia by district (1910)
District (Kreis)	Regierungsbezirk	Polish name	Population	German	%	Polish / Kashubian / Bilingual	%
Berent	Danzig	Powiat kościerski	55,976	23,682	42.3%	32,287	57.7%
Danziger Höhe	Danzig	Powiat Gdańskie Wyżyny	53,506	47,397	88.6%	6,071	11.3%
Danziger Niederung	Danzig	Powiat Gdańskie Wyżyny	36,345	36,008	99.1%	327	0.9%
Stadtkreis Danzig	Danzig	Powiat grodzki Gdańsk	170,337	164,343	96.5%	5,521	3.2%
Dirschau	Danzig	Powiat tczewski	42,723	27,865	65.2%	14,846	34.7%
Landkreis Elbing	Danzig	Powiat elbląski	38,611	38,558	99.9%	48	0.1%
Stadtkreis Elbing	Danzig	Powiat grodzki Elbląg	58,636	58,330	99.5%	248	0.4%
Karthaus	Danzig	Powiat kartuski	69,891	19,319	27.6%	50,568	72.4%
Marienburg	Danzig	Powiat malborski	62,999	61,050	96.9%	1,924	3.1%
Neustadt	Danzig	Powiat wejherowski	61,620	30,932	50.2%	30,661	49.8%
Preußisch Stargard	Danzig	Powiat starogardzki	65,427	17,165	26.2%	48,250	73.7%
Putzig	Danzig	Powiat pucki	26,548	7,970	30%	18,561	69.9%
Total (Danzig)	Danzig	Rejencja gdańska łącznie	742,619	532,619	71.7%	209,312	28.2%
Briesen	Marienwerder	Powiat wąbrzeski	49,506	24,007	48.5%	25,487	51.5%
Culm	Marienwerder	Powiat chełmiński	50,069	23,345	46.6%	26,709	53.3%
Deutsch Krone	Marienwerder	Powiat wałecki	62,182	61,143	98.3%	1,022	1.6%
Flatow	Marienwerder	Powiat złotowski	69,186	50,648	73.2%	18,531	26.8%
Landkreis Graudenz	Marienwerder	Powiat grudziądzki	48,818	28,755	58.9%	20,046	41.1%
Stadtkreis Graudenz	Marienwerder	Powiat grodzki Grudziądz	40,325	34,193	84.8%	6,076	15.1%
Konitz	Marienwerder	Powiat chojnicki	63,723	28,032	44%	35,670	56%
Löbau	Marienwerder	Powiat lubawski	59,037	12,119	20.5%	46,911	79.5%
Marienwerder	Marienwerder	Powiat kwidzyński	68,426	42,465	62.1%	25,944	37.9%
Rosenberg	Marienwerder	Powiat suski	54,550	50,194	92%	4,321	7.9%
Schlochau	Marienwerder	Powiat człuchowski	67,157	56,648	84.4%	10,488	15.6%
Schwetz	Marienwerder	Powiat świecki	89,712	42,233	47.1%	47,465	52.9%
Strasburg	Marienwerder	Powiat brodnicki	62,142	21,097	33.9%	41,026	66%
Stuhm	Marienwerder	Powiat sztumski	36,527	20,923	57.3%	15,583	42.7%
Landkreis Thorn	Marienwerder	Powiat toruński	59,317	27,751	46.8%	31,493	53.1%
Stadtkreis Thorn	Marienwerder	Powiat grodzki Toruń	46,227	30,505	66%	15,576	33.7%
Tuchel	Marienwerder	Powiat tucholski	33,951	11,265	33.2%	22,656	66.7%
Total (Marienwerder)	Marienwerder	Rejencja kwidzyńska łącznie	960,855	565,323	58.8%	395,004	41.1%
Total (West Prussia)	-	-	1,703,474	1,097,942	64.5%	604,316	35.5%

== See also ==
- History of Pomerania
- Territorial losses of Germany in the 20th century
