= Province of Prussia =

Province of Prussia (1829–1878)

Province of Prussia Provinz Preußen (German)
- Province of the Kingdom of Prussia
- 1829–1878
- Flag Coat of arms

- Province of Prussia (red), within the Kingdom of Prussia (blue), within the German Empire
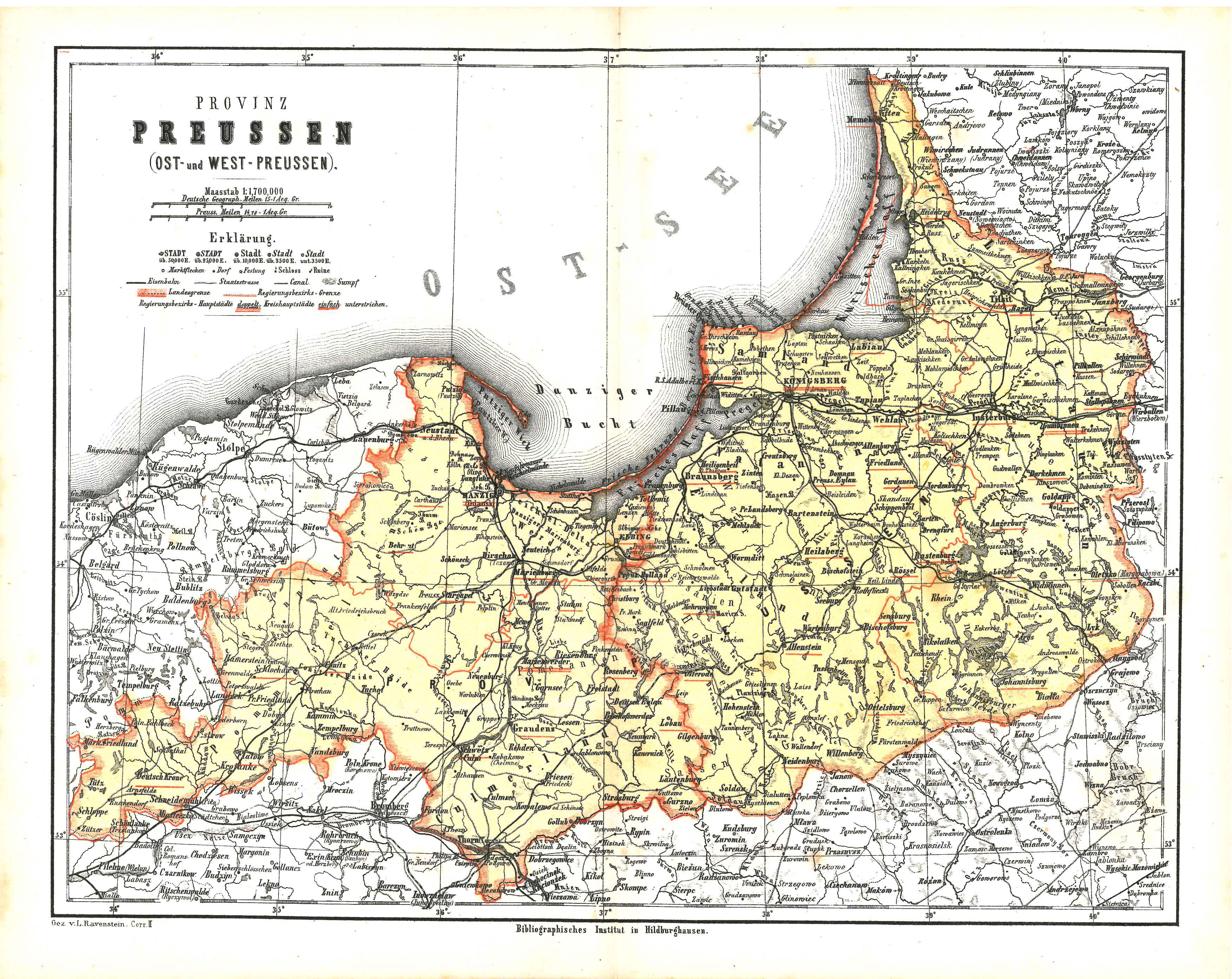
- Map of the Province of Prussia showing the border between West Prussia and East Prussia
- Capital: Königsberg
- Demonym: Prussian
- Area
  - Coordinates: 54°44′N 20°29′E
  - 1871: 62,528 km^{2} (24,142 sq mi)
- Population
  - 1871: 3,137,545
- History
  - Established: 1829
  - Disestablished: 1878
- Political subdivisions: Königsberg; Gumbinnen; Danzig; Marienwerder
Preceded by	Succeeded by
West Prussia; East Prussia	West Prussia; East Prussia
- Today part of: Lithuania; Poland; Russia

The Province of Prussia (German: Provinz Preußen; Polish: Prowincja Prusy; Lithuanian: Prūsijos provincija; Kashubian: Prowincjô Prësë) was a province of the Kingdom of Prussia from 1829 to 1878. It was created by joining the provinces of West Prussia and East Prussia and was dissolved in 1878 when the merger was reversed. Königsberg (present day Kaliningrad, Russia) was the provincial capital.

== History ==
=== Background ===
Until 1466, most of what became the Province of Prussia belonged to the State of the Teutonic Order. In 1454, the Prussian Confederation revolted against the rule of the Order and precipitated the Thirteen Years' War. At the end of the fighting in 1466, the Second Peace of Thorn established Royal Prussia in the region that approximately corresponded to the future West Prussia. It was a province of the Crown of the Kingdom of Poland and was integrated into the Polish–Lithuanian Commonwealth when it was formed in 1569.

The 1466 peace treaty left the eastern part of the region, covering roughly the same area as the later East Prussia, under the Teutonic Order as a fief of the Polish Crown. In 1525, while it was still a vassal state of Poland, the rule of the Order came to an end, and eastern Prussia became the Duchy of Prussia. The Hohenzollern rulers of Brandenburg inherited the Duchy in 1618, with the resulting state known as Brandenburg–Prussia. Frederick William, the Great Elector of Brandenburg, achieved full sovereignty over the Duchy in 1660. It was elevated in status to become the Kingdom of Prussia in 1701.

In the First Partition of Poland (1772), Prussia's King Frederick II (Frederick the Great) arranged for the Russian Empire to annex the eastern part of the weak and divided Polish–Lithuanian Commonwealth and for Prussia to take most of Royal Prussia. On 31 January 1733, he had the former Duchy of Prussia renamed East Prussia and the newly acquired region West Prussia. German-speaking Protestants made up 54% of the annexed area and 75% of the urban population. The cities of Danzig and Thorn became part of West Prussia in the Second Partition of Poland in 1793.

The Congress of Vienna (1814–1815), as part of redrawing many of Europe's national borders after the Napoleonic Wars, created the 39-state German Confederation (1815–1866) to stand in the place of the disbanded Holy Roman Empire. The Confederation included the Kingdom of Prussia but not East and West Prussia because they had not been part of the Holy Roman Empire. Prussian King Frederick William III had wanted them included in the Confederation so that if a border war broke out with the Russian Empire, the Confederation would be obliged to support him. He was opposed by Austria's powerful Prince Metternich, who feared that including East and West Prussia would shift the balance of power too much in favor of Prussia, and the two provinces remained outside the Confederation.

=== Creation ===
Following the Congress of Vienna, the Kingdom of Prussia reorganized itself into ten provinces. Jakob von Auerswald was named governor (Oberpräsident) of East Prussia with its capital at Königsberg, and Theodor von Schön accepted the governorship of West Prussia at its capital, Danzig. From the time he took office, Schön spoke out repeatedly in favor of uniting the two provinces. An East Prussian by birth, he thought that the region had seen too little progress and believed that it would develop best if it were united under his own leadership. When Auerswald retired in 1824, Frederick William III appointed Schön governor of East Prussia as well. His position at the head of both provinces joined the two in a personal union with Königsberg as the capital. An unpublished cabinet order of 3 December 1829 made the union official and created the Province of Prussia. Schön remained its governor until 1842.

The Province of Prussia briefly became part of the German Confederation during the German revolutions of 1848–1849. With the support of King Frederick William IV, the assembly of representatives from across the Confederation that was meeting at Frankfurt voted unanimously to admit the province on 11 April 1848. The decision allowed its male citizens to elect members to the Frankfurt National Assembly, the first freely elected parliament for all the German states. Poles living in the former West Prussia formed an association that protested the moves and resolved to boycott the election. After the failure of the revolution, the restored parliament of the German Confederation, the Federal Convention (Bundesversammlung), expelled the Province of Prussia on 3 October 1851.

=== Separation ===
A number of factors led to the Province of Prussia being split into East and West Prussia in 1878, seven years after the founding of the German Empire. There were differences between the two regions' economies and local government institutions, and with the rise of Polish nationalism, the significant Polish minority in the west was causing increasing concern. In addition, as Danzig's economic strength grew, its leading citizens argued that it should become a provincial capital again and move out from under Königsberg's shadow.

Under a law of 19 March 1877, Emperor Wilhelm I, with the agreement of both houses of parliament, set down the conditions for the division of the province, which was to take place on 1 April 1878. From that date the Province of Prussia ceased to exist.

== Governors ==
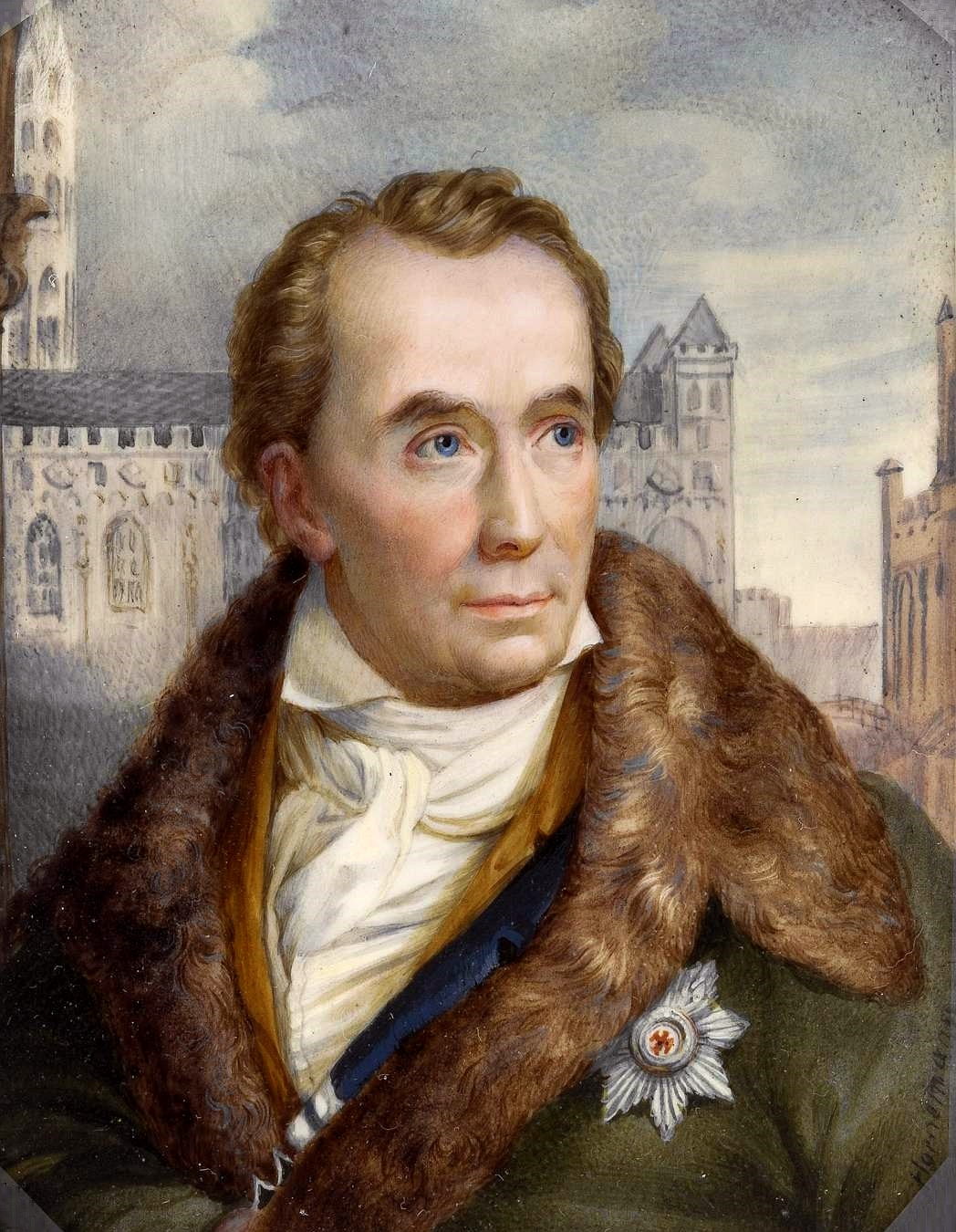
Theodor von Schön, the Province of Prussia's first and longest-serving governor

The Province of Prussia's governors (Oberpräsidenten) were:

- 1824–1842 Theodor von Schön
- 1842–1848 Karl Wilhelm Bötticher
- 1848–1849 Rudolf von Auerswald
- 1849–1850 Eduard von Flottwell
- 1850–1868 Franz August Eichmann
- 1869–1878 Karl von Horn

== Demographics ==
In 1850, the two west Prussian districts of Danzig und Marienwerder were approximately 65% German and 35% Polish. The east Prussian districts of Königsberg und Gumbinnen were about 70% German, 19% Polish and 11% Lithuanian.
