= Reichsgau Danzig-West Prussia =

Administrative division of Nazi Germany

- Reichsgau of Nazi Germany
- 1939–1945
- Flag Coat of arms

- Map of Nazi Germany showing its administrative subdivisions (Gaue and Reichsgaue)
- Capital: Danzig
- Government
- Gauleiter
  - 1939–1945: Albert Forster
- History
  - Establishment: 8 October 1939
  - Disestablishment: 1 August 1945
Preceded by
Pomeranian Voivodeship
Free City of Danzig
Marienwerder
Gau East Prussia
Succeeded by
Gdańsk Voivodeship
Masurian District
- Today part of: Poland

Reichsgau Danzig-West Prussia (German: Reichsgau Danzig-Westpreußen) was an administrative division of Nazi Germany created on 8 October 1939 from annexed territory of the Free City of Danzig, the Pomeranian Voivodeship (Polish Corridor) of the Second Polish Republic, and the Regierungsbezirk West Prussia of Gau East Prussia.

Before 2 November 1939, the Reichsgau was called Reichsgau West Prussia. Though the name resembled that of the pre-1920 Prussian province of West Prussia, the territory was not identical. Unlike the former Prussian province, the Reichsgau included the Bromberg (Bydgoszcz) region in the south and lacked the Deutsch-Krone (Wałcz) region in the west.

The province's capital was Danzig (Gdańsk), and its population without the city was (in 1939) 1,487,452. The province's area was 26,056 km^{2}, 21,237 km^{2} of which was annexed Danzig and Pomeranian territory. During the Reichsgau's short existence, Poles and Jews in that area were subjected by Nazi Germany to extermination as "subhumans".

== History ==
The Prussian province West Prussia created from Polish territory annexed by Prussia in Partitions of Poland was dissolved in 1920, following the Treaty of Versailles. The bulk of it inhabited by Polish majority became part of the newly established Second Republic of Poland and was administered as Pomeranian Voivodship (Polish Corridor). The eastern remains of German West Prussia were attached to the Province of East Prussia as Regierungsbezirk West Prussia - a Regierungsbezirk ("government region") being a German administrative subunit of a province (Provinz) comprising several counties (Kreise). The western remains of German West Prussia were merged to the German remains of the former Province of Posen and made a new province, Posen-West Prussia.

After the Nazis came to power in Germany, they reformed the administrative system by transforming the former German provinces and states into their Gau system in 1935 as a part of their Gleichschaltung policy.

In 1938, German Posen-West Prussia was dissolved and its former West Prussian territory was attached to the German Pomeranian Gau. Also in 1938, the Polish Pomeranian Voivodship was expanded southward to comprise the Bydgoszcz region. The resulting enlarged Pomeranian voivodeship was called Greater Pomeranian Voivodship (Wielkopomorskie).

When Nazi Germany invaded Poland in September 1939, this Greater Pomeranian voivodship was first made the German military district "West Prussia", and by a decree of Adolf Hitler on 8 October merged with the Free City of Danzig and the East Prussian Regierungsbezirk West Prussia, to form the Reichsgau West Prussia. The western remains remained outside and continued to be administered by the German Pomeranian Gau as Regierungsbezirk Grenzmark Posen-West Prussia according to the 1938 reform, while the Bromberg (Bydogoszcz) region stayed with Reichsgau West Prussia and was not attached to Reichsgau Posen, the later "Warthegau". The designation Reichsgau instead of just Gau indicates that the province primarily consisted of annexed territory. A Gauleiter of a Reichsgau was also titled Reichsstatthalter. Other Reichsgaue were e.g. Reichsgau Wartheland and Reichsgau Sudetenland.

The Free City of Danzig comprised the Nazi Party's Gau Danzig which had been established in March 1926. The Gauleiters of Gau Danzig were:

- Hans Albert Hohnfeldt (March 1926 - June 1928)
- Walter Maass, Acting (August 1928 - March 1929)
- Erich Koch, Acting (March 1929 - September 1930)
- Arthur Greiser, Acting (October 1930)
- Albert Forster (from 15 October 1930)

On 1 September 1939 at the start of the war, Germany immediately annexed the Free City of Danzig. Following the establishment of the new Reichsgau Danzig-West Prussia on 8 October, Forster was named Gauleiter and Reichsstatthalter of the expanded territory on 26 October.

== Population ==
The Reichsgau was very heterogenous, like the territory, which comprised territory of the pre-war Danzig (completely), of Germany (West Prussia Government Region) and of Poland (roughly the Pomeranian Voivodeship), the population amounted to 2,179,000 altogether, with 1,494,000 Polish citizens of mostly Polish ethnicity, 408,000 Danzig citizens of mostly German ethnicity and 277,000 German citizens of mostly German ethnicity. The German occupiers considered the Danzig and Polish citizenships as naught, due to the de facto abolition of these two states. Christian Danzigers and Christian Poles of German ethnicity were granted German citizenship, Jewish Danzigers, and Jewish Poles of which ethnicity so ever were denied the German citizenship. As to Christian Danzigers and Christian Poles of Polish ethnicity the acceptance as citizens was mostly denied, but under certain circumstances granted.

=== Extermination and expulsion of ethnic Poles and Jews by Nazi Germany ===
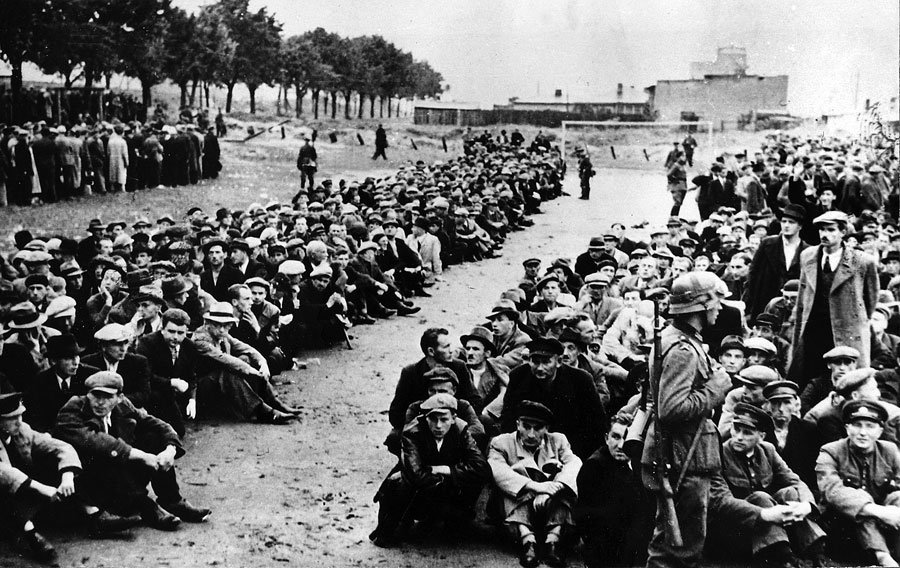
Polish nationals rounded up during the ethnic cleansing of Gdynia, September 1939

Nazi German policy aimed at extermination of Jewish and Polish population. Mass-murder sites in the region include:

- Stutthof concentration camp, where over 85,000 died (mostly Poles);
- Piaśnica, where some 12,000 local Polish-Kashub intelligentsia and others were murdered.

Nazi policy to exterminate the Polish and Jewish populations was conducted in several phases; the first stage occurred in September 1939. The main Nazi responsible for genocide conducted in the Pomeranian Voivodeship was Gauleiter Albert Forster, who was involved in the mass murder and ethnic cleansing of Jews and ethnic Poles and enlisted to his program, often under threat of violence, Polish citizens—descendants of Germanic settlers—whom the Nazis saw as Germans. Forster declared that Poles must be eradicated: "We must exterminate this nation, starting from the cradle."

The Reichsgau was the site of the Stutthof concentration camp and its sub camps where over 85,000 people were executed or died of illness, starvation or mistreatment. Of the 52,000 Jews who were sent to the camp only around 3,000 would survive.

During the Winter of 1939/40 between 12,000 and 16,000 people were murdered at Piaśnica by Einsatzkommando 16, units of the 36th Regiment of SS, and members of the Selbstschutz, a militia force made up of Poles of German ethnicity. The local Selbstschutz, under the command of Ludolf von Alvensleben, numbered 17,667 and before their disbandment in October 1939 had killed 4,247 people.

Commander of the Selbstschutz Ludolf von Alvensleben told his men on 16 October 1939:

You are now the master race here. Nothing was yet built up through softness and weakness... That’s why I expect, just as our Führer Adolf Hitler expects from you, that you are disciplined, but stand together hard as Krupp steel. Don’t be soft, be merciless, and clear out everything that is not German and could hinder us in the work of construction.

Jews did not figure prominently among the victims in West Prussia, as the area's Jewish population was small and most had fled before the Germans arrived. However, in places where they were present, they were expelled and murdered in what was classified as "other measures" which simply meant murder. In areas where Jewish families or individuals remained, a "shameful situation" was proclaimed, and Nazi authorities expected the Selbstschutz to remedy it through "direct action". In August 1943 around 500 Jews from a camp in the Pomeranian Voivodeship were sent to Auschwitz, out of which 434 were immediately killed upon arrival.

It is estimated that, by war's end, up to 60,000 people had been murdered in the region, and up to 170,000 expelled. though other estimates place the figure at around 35,000. Forster himself reported that, by February 1940, 87,000 people had been "evacuated" from the region.

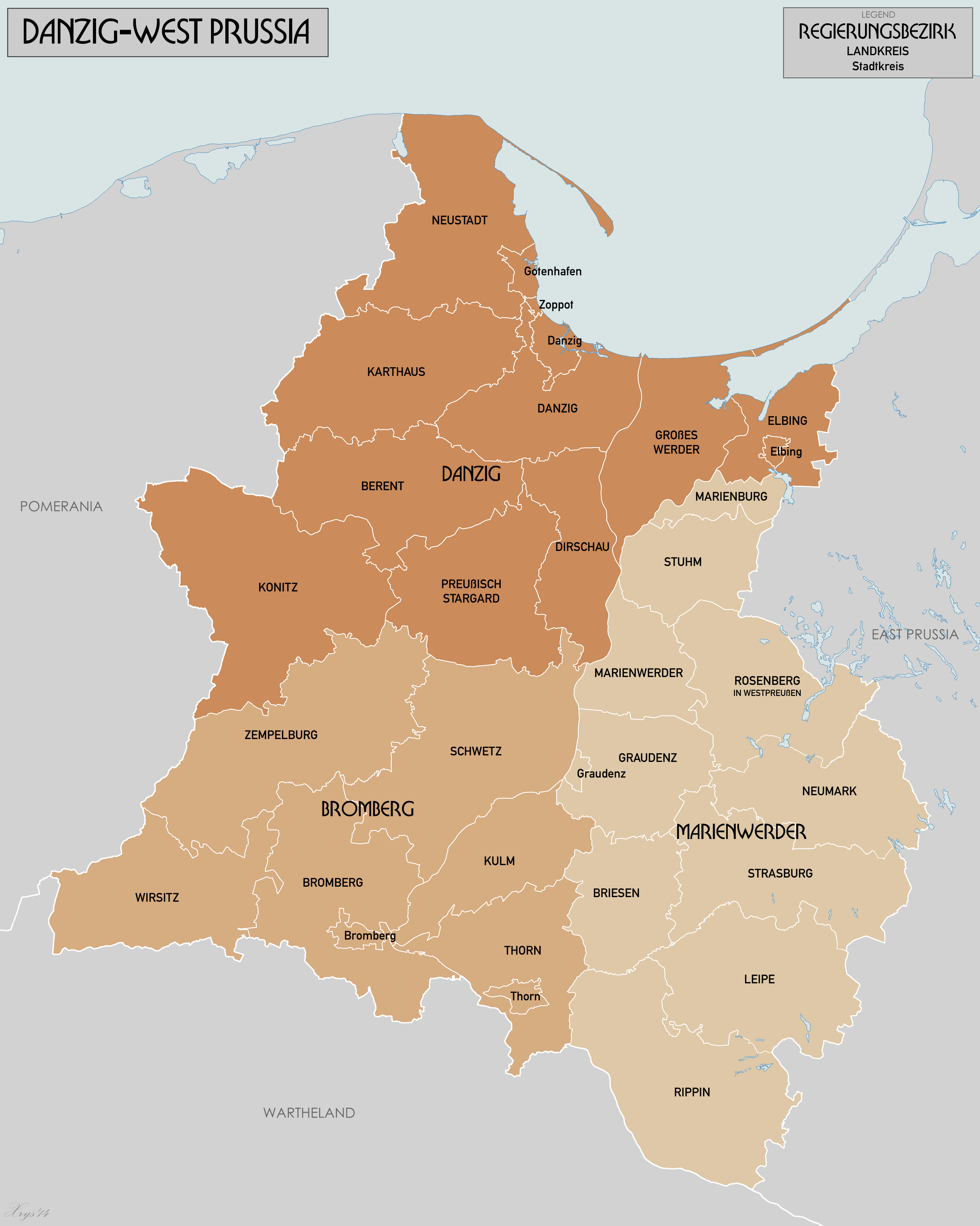
Counties (Regierungsbezirk) and districts (Kreis), 1944

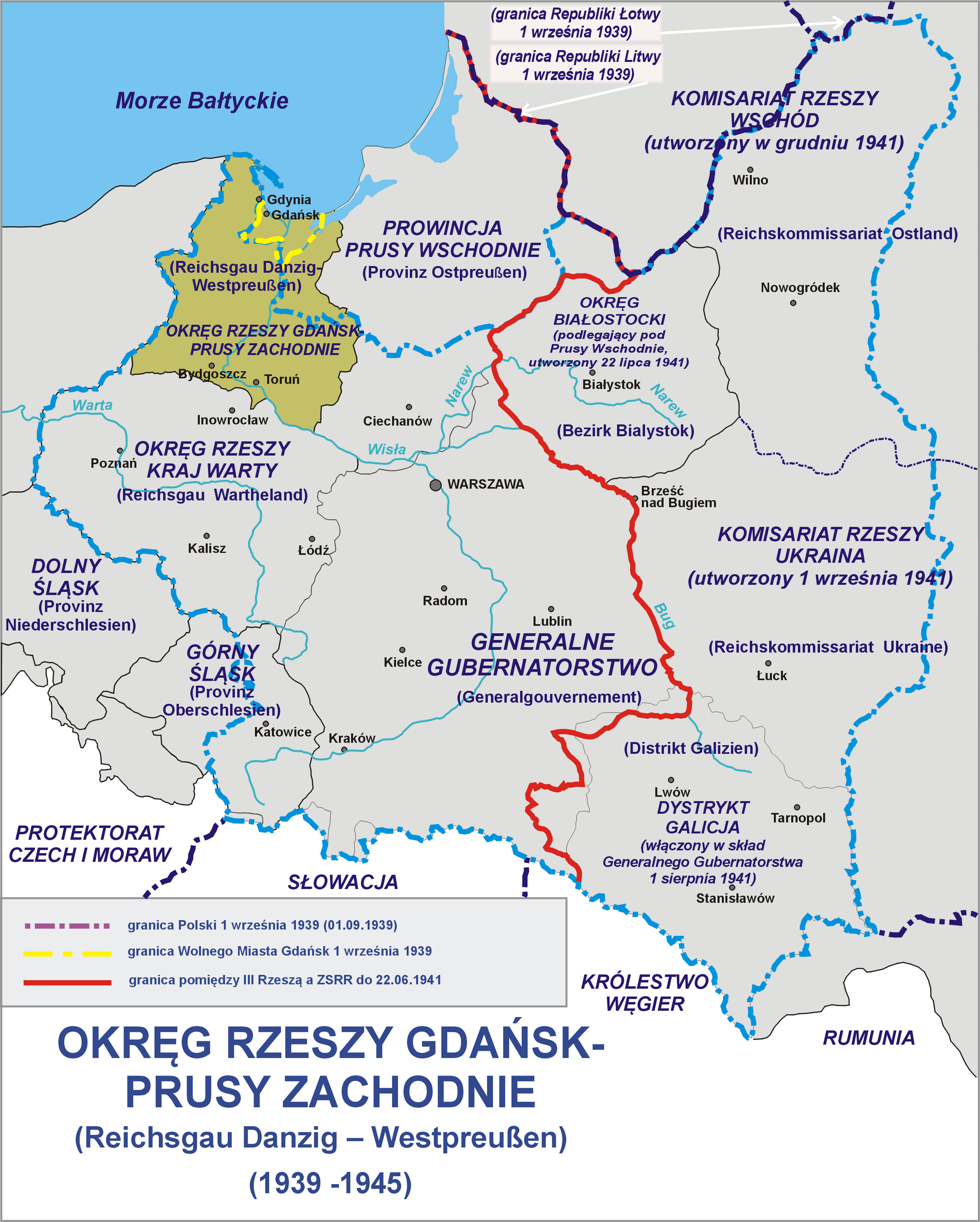
Reichsgau Danzig-West Prussia on the map of the Second Polish Republic

== Administration ==
Danzig-West Prussia was divided into three government regions (Regierungsbezirk), with the name-giving capital cities of Bromberg, Danzig and Marienwerder.

In 1939 the Free City of Danzig was annexed to Germany. After a brief transitional period, its territory became part of the restored Regierungsbezirk Danzig in the Reichsgau Danzig-Westpreussen (the restored Prussian Province of West Prussia) and was divided into nine districts (Kreise):

- Kreis Berent
- Danzig-Land (Rural)
- Danzig-Stadt City
- Dirschau
- Elbing-Land (Rural)
- Grosses Werder
- Karthaus
- Neustadt
- Zoppot City County (detached from Neustadt)

Regierungsbezirk Danzig Governing Presidents/Regierungspräsidenten:

- 1940–1943 – Fritz Hermann
- 1943–1945 – Albert Forster

The NSDAP gauleiter of Danzig, Albert Forster, became leader of Civil Administration in Danzig in 1939, as well as Gauleiter and Reichsstatthalter of the Reichsgau. He remained the most powerful politician throughout the war, until the area was overrun by the Soviet forces in March 1945.

The Wehrmacht established there the Wehrkreis XX, based at Danzig, under the command of

- General der Artillerie Walter Heitz (11 Sep 1939 - 23 Oct 1939) (as Befehlshaber Danzig-Westpreußen)
- General der Infanterie Max Bock (23 Oct 1939 - 30 Apr 1943)
- General der Infanterie Bodewin Keitel (30 Apr 1943 - 30 Nov 1944)
- General der Infanterie Karl-Wilhelm Specht (1 Dec 1944 - ? Jan 1945)

== Cities and towns ==
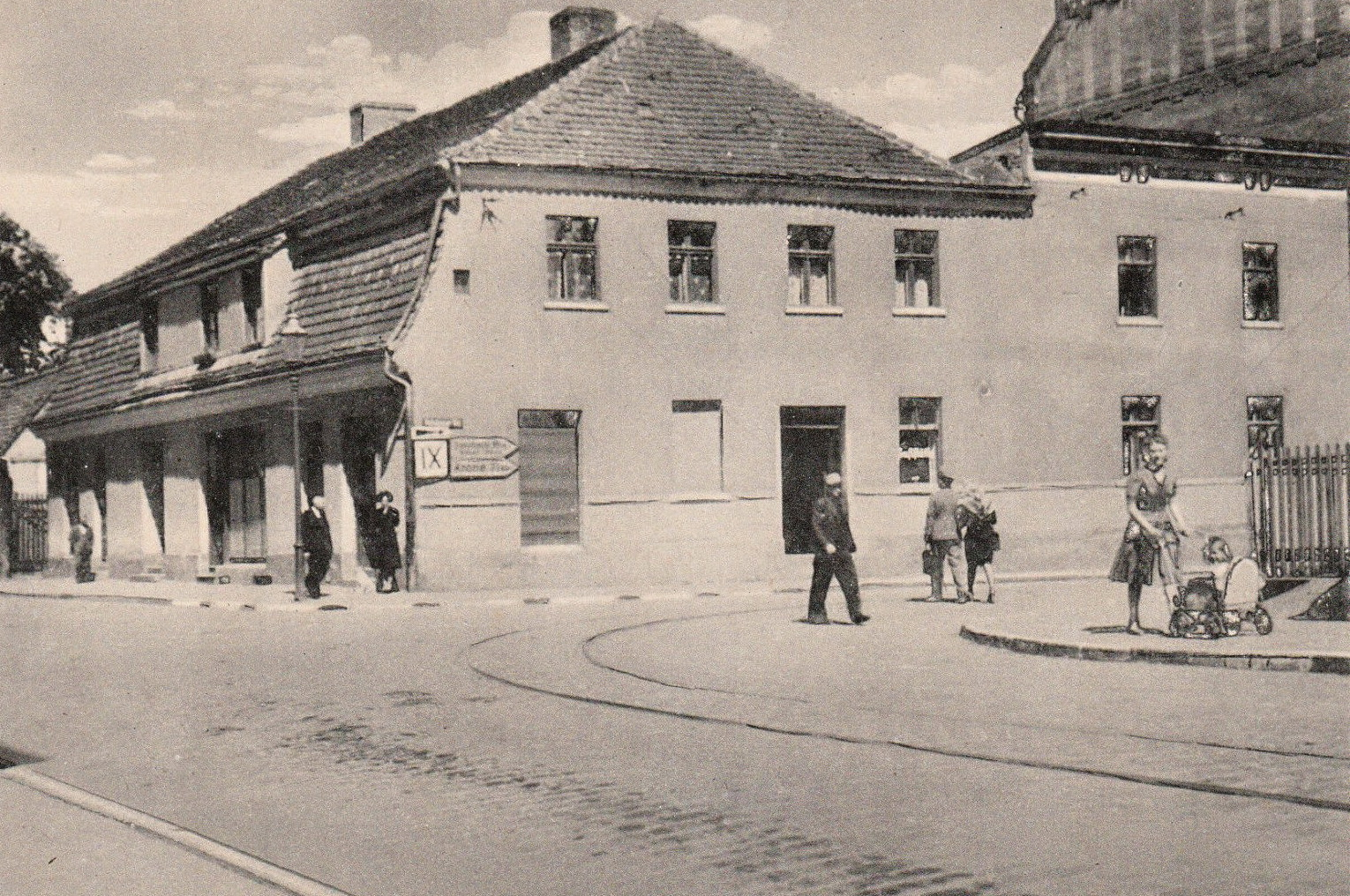
Bydgoszcz in 1940

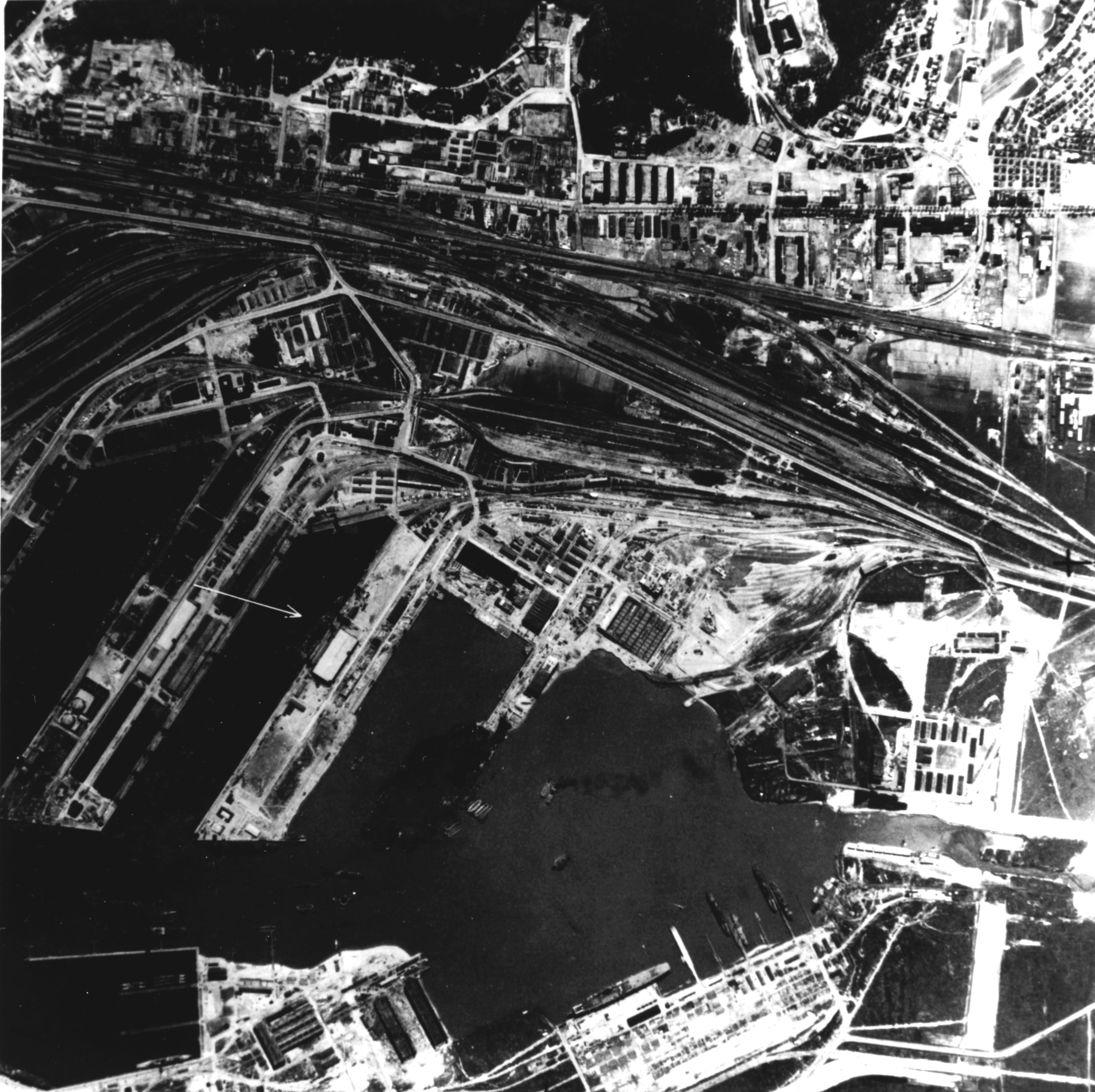
Aerial reconnaissance photo of Gdynia, 1942

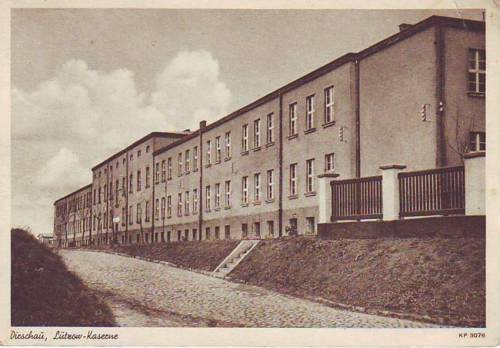
Military barracks in Tczew in 1940

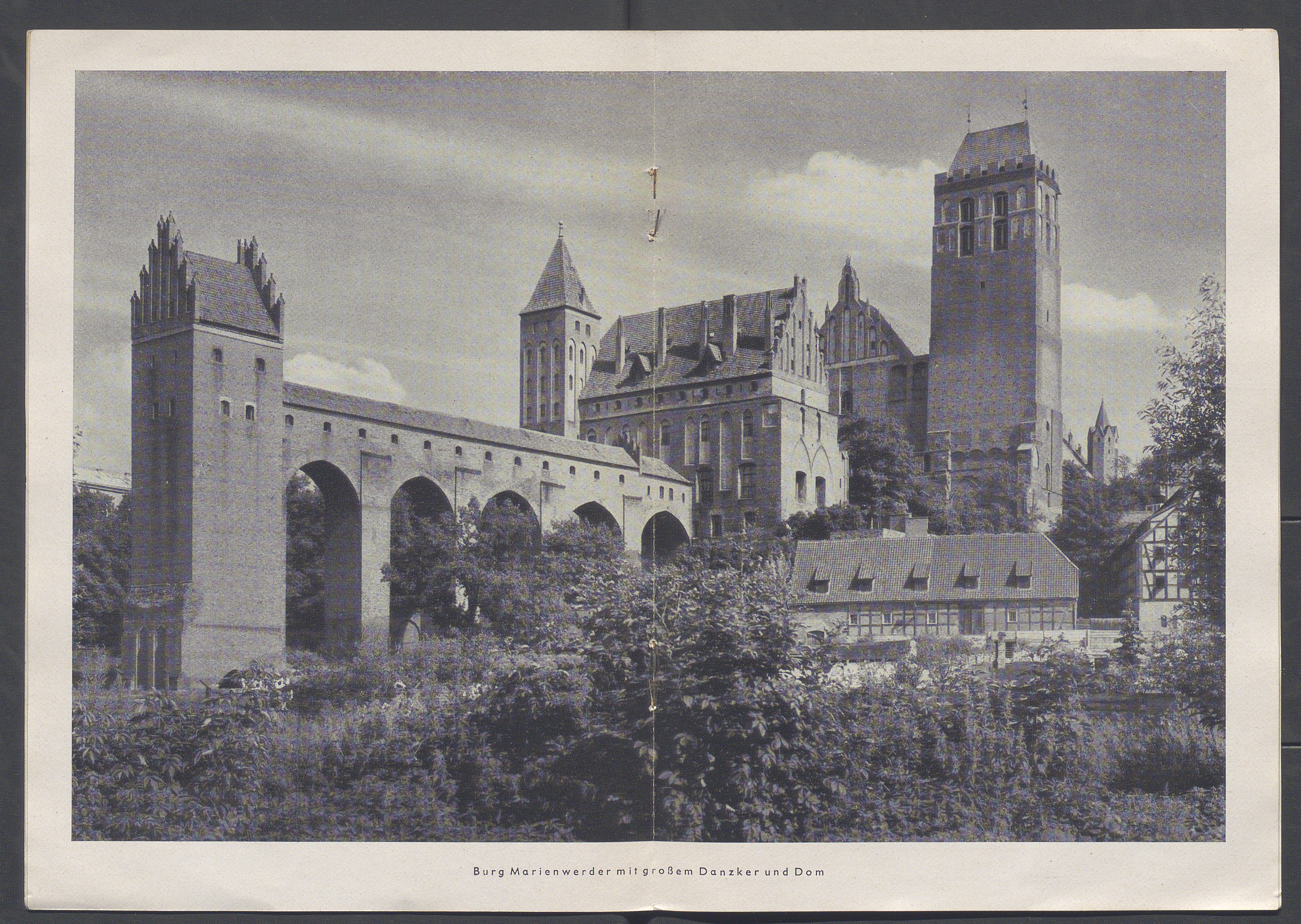
Kwidzyn Castle in 1944

	German name	Polish name	Pre-war population (1939)
1.	Danzig	Gdańsk	250,000
2.	Bromberg	Bydgoszcz	141,000
3.	Gotenhafen	Gdynia	120,000
4.	Elbing	Elbląg	85,925
5.	Thorn	Toruń	81,215
6.	Graudenz	Grudziądz	59,200
7.	Zoppot	Sopot	31,000
8.	Marienburg	Malbork	27,318
9.	Dirschau	Tczew	25,398
10.	Marienwerder	Kwidzyn	20,484
11.	Konitz	Chojnice	16,975
12.	Preußisch Stargard	Starogard Gdański	15,356
13.	Neustadt in Westpreußen	Wejherowo	14,566
14.	Deutsch Eylau	Iława	13,922
15.	Kulm	Chełmno	13,452
16.	Kulmsee	Chełmża	12,983
17.	Leipe	Lipno	12,018
18.	Strasburg	Brodnica	11,220
19.	Briesen	Wąbrzeźno	9,551
20.	Berent	Kościerzyna	9,499
21.	Rippin	Rypin	9,100
22.	Schwetz	Świecie	8,964
23.	Czersk/Heiderode	Czersk	8,500
24.	Riesenburg	Prabuty	8,051
25.	Lautenburg	Lidzbark	7,783
26.	Stuhm	Sztum	7,372
27.	Tuchel	Tuchola	6,000
28.	Löbau in Westpreußen	Lubawa	5,791
29.	Dobrin an der Drewenz	Dobrzyń nad Drwęcą	5,694
30.	Karthaus	Kartuzy	5,600
31.	Krone an der Brahe	Koronowo	5,560
32.	Putzig	Puck	5,203
33.	Neuenburg (Weichsel)	Nowe	5,131
34.	Neumark in Westpreußen	Nowe Miasto Lubawskie	4,958
35.	Fordon	Fordon	4,921
36.	Zempelburg	Sępólno Krajeńskie	4,481
37.	Rosenberg in Westpreußen	Susz	4,480
38.	Vandsburg	Więcbork	4,350
39.	Pelplin	Pelplin	4,218
40.	Tolkemit	Tolkmicko	3,875
41.	Tiegenhof	Nowy Dwór Gdański	3,851
42.	Schöneck	Skarszewy	3,700
43.	Schönsee	Kowalewo Pomorskie	3,692
44.	Neuteich	Nowy Staw	3,652
45.	Christburg	Dzierzgoń	3,604
46.	Freystadt in Westpreußen	Kisielice	3,351
47.	Mewe	Gniew	3,500
48.	Gollub	Golub	3,297
49.	Dobrin an der Weichsel	Dobrzyń nad Wisłą	3,207
50.	Schönhausen/Immenheim	Mrocza	2,670
51.	Lessen	Łasin	2,541
52.	Lobsens	Łobżenica	2,506
53.	Rehden	Radzyń Chełmiński	2,251
54.	Garnsee	Gardeja	2,003
55.	Görzberg	Górzno	1,947
56.	Wirsitz	Wyrzysk	1,898
57.	Bischofswerder	Biskupiec	1,828
58.	Kamin in Westpreußen	Kamień Krajeński	1,523
59.	Wissek/Weißeck	Wysoka	1,509
60.	Friedheim	Miasteczko Krajeńskie	1,218

== Polish resistance ==
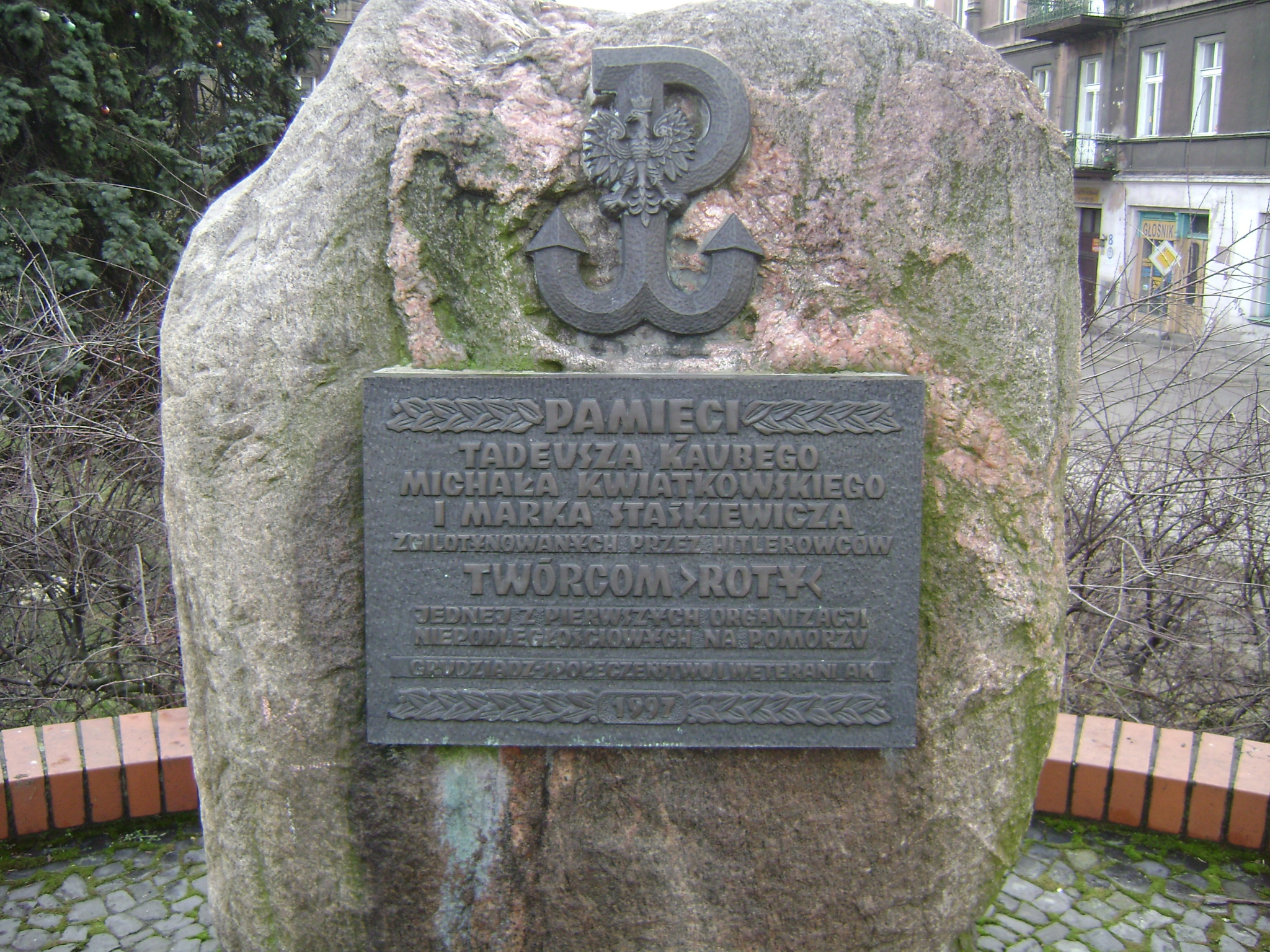
Memorial to founders of the Rota resistance organization in Grudziądz

The Polish resistance movement was active in the region, both in the pre-war Polish and German-controlled parts of the region, with activities including secret Polish schooling, printing and distribution of Polish underground press, sabotage actions, espionage of German activity, smuggling data on German persecution of Poles and Jews and on German V-weapons to Western Europe and facilitating escapes of endangered Polish resistance members and Polish, British, French and Russian prisoners of war who fled from German POW camps via the port cities to neutral Sweden. In 1943, local Poles managed to save some kidnapped Polish children from the Zamość region, by buying them from the Germans during transport through the region. The Gestapo cracked down on the Polish resistance several times, with the Poles either killed or sent to prisons of concentration camps.

== Post-war ==
In March 1945, the region was reclaimed by Poland, and the Nazi governor, Albert Forster, was later sentenced to death and executed for crimes against humanity. The German population (including wartime settlers, Nazis, and military officials) either fled or was expelled in accordance with the Potsdam Agreement.

== See also ==
- World War II evacuation and expulsion
- Polish areas annexed by Nazi Germany

== Sources ==
- (in German) Shoa.de - List of Gaue and Gauleiter
- (in German) Die NS Gaue at the Deutsches Historisches Museum website.
- (in German) Die Gaue der NSDAP
