= Flag of Sopot =

The flag of Sopot is the official flag of the city of Sopot in the Pomeranian Voivodeship.

== Appearance and symbolism ==
The city flag is a rectangular flag with proportions of 5:8, identical on both sides, with two horizontally strips, sky blue on the top strip and gold on the bottom strip. Proporcje szerokości pola błękitnego do złotego wynoszą 1:1. In the centre of the flag field are elements from the city's coat of arms; a white gull and a white fish.

== History ==
The first flag of Sopot was established in 1904, along with the granting of the town's coat of arms. It did not feature any symbols from the town's coat of arms, only two horizontally arranged fields: blue at the top and gold at the bottom. After World War II, it fell out of use. It was not until 1994 that Jerzy Cisłak reminded people of its existence and proposed that it be re-established. A team led by Prof. Błażej Śliwiński, commissioned by the city, prepared new designs for the coat of arms and flag, adding the city's coat of arms to the pre-war version of the flag. This design was adopted by the city councillors in 1995.

== See also ==
- List of county flags of Pomeranian Voivodeship
- List of municipal flags of Pomeranian Voivodeship
