= List of municipal flags of Pomeranian Voivodeship =

The following list includes flags of municipalities (gminy) in the Pomeranian Voivodeship, Poland.

Flag of the Pomeranian Voivodeship

According to the definition, a flag is a sheet of fabric of a specific shape, colour and meaning, attached to a spar or mast. It may also include the coat of arms or emblem of the administrative unit concerned. In Poland, territorial units (municipal, city and county councils) may establish flags in accordance with the Act of 21 December 1978 on badges and uniforms. In its original version, it only allowed territorial units to establish coats of arms. Despite that many cities and municipalities adopted resolutions and used a flag as their symbol. It was not until the Act of 29 December 1998 amending certain acts in connection with the implementation of the state system reform that the right of voivodeships, counties and municipalities to establish this symbol of a territorial unit was officially confirmed.

In 2024, 79 out of 123 municipalities in Pomorskie Voivodeship had their own flag (the municipality of Puck uses an unofficial flag). Gdańsk has the oldest one (since 1467). This symbol, since 2002, has also been established by the voivodeship itself.

== List of valid municipal flags ==
=== Bytow County ===
Municipality	Flag	Description
Gmina Borzytuchom		The municipal flag was established by Resolution No. XXVII/132/01 of 14 November 2001. It is a rectangular flag with proportions of 5:8, divided into two equal horizontal stripes - yellow and blue. In the central part of the flag is the municipal coat of arms.
City and gmina Bytów		The municipal flag was established by Resolution No. XLIX/337/02 of 11 October 2002. It is a rectangular flag with proportions of 5:8, blue in colour, in the upper left corner of the flag the coat of arms of the municipality is placed, and under it a white and red stripe.
Gmina Czarna Dąbrówka		The municipal flag is a rectangular flag, divided into three equal vertical stripes: two yellow and one blue. In the central part of the flag the emblem from the municipal coat of arms is placed.
Gmina Lipnica		The municipal flag was established by Resolution No. XXIV/234/2013 of 6 September 2013. It is a rectangular flag with proportions of 5:8, divided into three horizontal stripes: green, black and yellow in the ratio of 1:2:1. In the central part of the flag the municipal coat of arms is placed.
City and gmina Miastko		The municipal flag was established by Resolution No. 81/V/2010 of 29 October 2010. It is a rectangular flag with proportions of 5:8, divided diagonally from the right by a yellow stripe into two parts: the left one is green (symbolising the municipal forest complexes) and the right one is blue (referring to the numerous lakes). In the central part of the flag is the municipal coat of arms.
Gmina Studzienice		The municipal flag was established by Resolution No XXVIII/248/2010 of 9 March 2010. It is a rectangular flag with proportions of 5:8, divided into three horizontal stripes: two yellow and one green in the ratio 3:14:3. In the central part of the flag the municipal coat of arms is placed.
Gmina Trzebielino		The municipal flag was established by Resolution No. 154/XXXI/2005 of 30 August 2005. It is a rectangular flag with proportions of 5:8, blue in colour, in the central part of the flag the emblem from the municipal coat of arms is placed.

=== Chojnice County ===
Municipality	Flag	Description
City and gmina Brusy		The municipality's flag was established by Resolution No. VIII-106/99 of 9 September 1999. It is a rectangular flag with proportions of 5:8, divided into three stripes - two smaller ones, blue in colour, and a larger one, white in colour. In the central part of the flag is an element taken from the municipal coat of arms - a red griffin holding the letter ‘B’ in its claws.
City of Chojnice		The city's flag is a flag with a rectangular shape and proportions of 5:8, established on 16 February 1995. It consists of three stripes arranged horizontally and with colours referring to the coat of arms. Black is the colour of the aurochs' head, grey is the coat of arms background, and yellow is the colour of the horns and ring
Gmina Chojnice		The municipal flag is a rectangular flag with proportions of 5:8, established on 29 November 1995. It is divided into 3 equal horizontal stripes. Their colours refer to the municipal coat of arms and have their own symbolism. The green colour refers to the municipalities forests and ecology, the yellow reminds us of the fields and agriculture, while the blue is for the lakes and rivers.
City and gmina Czersk		The municipality's flag was established by the councillors by means of Resolution No. XI/94/99 of 30 June 1999. It is rectangular in shape, with a ratio of 5:8, and is divided into three horizontal stripes - the upper green and the lower blue, each occupying 1/4 of the width of the field, and the central white. In the central part of the flag the coat of arms of Czersk is placed.
Gmina Konarzyny		The municipal flag was established by the councillors by means of Resolution No. XXX/191/2002 of 15 June 2002. It is a rectangular flag divided into four stripes - yellow and red (each occupying 2/5 of the flag's width), divided by blue and white stripes.

=== Człuchow County ===
Municipality	Flag	Description
City of Człuchów		The city's flag was established in 2004 and was designed by the city councillor, Dariusz Odalanowski. It is a rectangular flag with proportions of 5:8, divided into three equal vertical stripes - red, white and yellow. In the central part of the flag is the city's coat of arms.
Gmina Człuchów		The municipal flag, designed by Tadeusz Matwijewicz, was established on 29 December 2008 by Resolution No. XXIV/190/08. It is a rectangular flag with proportions of 3:5. divided into three equal horizontal stripes - two white (outer) and blue (central). These colours refer to the values symbolised by the colours in Christian-European culture, as well as to the municipal coat of arms.
City and gmina Debrzno		The flag of the municipality, adopted by Resolution No. 17.XXVI.2016 of the Municipal Council of Debrzno of 29 February 2016, is a rectangular flag with proportions of 5:8 by Kamil Wójcikowski and Robert Fidura, divided into three horizontal stripes - green (constituting 3/5 of the flag's surface) and white and black (of equal width). To left side of the flag is the municipal coat of arms.
Gmina Koczała		The municipality's flag was approved by the councillors in Resolution No. XXXIV/213/2018 of 29 May 2018. It has proportions of 5:8 and is blue in colour. In its central part, elements from the municipal coat of arms are placed - a silver lily, symbolising the Blessed Virgin Mary, and a golden balsam, the symbol of Mary Magdalene.
Gmina Przechlewo		The municipal flag was adopted on 10 September 2011. It is a rectangular flag with proportions of 8:13, blue in colour. In the central part of the flag is the emblem from the municipal coat of arms - a golden half-sun and a golden image of a fish.
Gmina Rzeczenica		The municipality's flag, designed by Tadeusz Matwijewicz, was established by Resolution No. LVII/427/23 of 29 June 2023. It is a rectangular flag with proportions of 5:8, divided into five horizontal stripes: three blue and two white in the ratio of 6:1:1:1:1. A white Greek cross is placed in the upper left corner of the flag which is also an emblem from the municipal coat of arms.

=== City of Gdańsk ===
Flag	Description
	The city's flag was established by resolution No. XXXVIII/432/96 of 1 August 1996, although it had existed since 1457. It is a rectanglular flag with proportions of 5:8, red in colour with a gold crown and under it two isosceles silver crosses arranged in a column (as in the coat of arms design). The common axis of the crosses and the crown is situated at a distance of 1/3 of the length of the flag from the hoist.

=== Gdańsk County ===
Municipality	Flag	Description
Gmina Cedry Wielkie		The municipality's flag, with proportions of 5:8 and established on 30 May 2001, is a rectangular flag divided into three horizontal stripes - red, green and yellow (constituting 1/2 the width of the flag). In the central part of the flag is the municipal coat of arms.
Gmina Pruszcz Gdański		The flag of the municipality was established by Resolution No. XXXVII/94/2013 of 14 November 2013, its author is Tomasz Steifer. It is a rectangular flag with proportions of 5:8, divided into three vertical stripes: two green and a white one in the middle in the ratio of 1:2.5. The central part of the flag features the municipal coat of arms.
Gmina Suchy Dąb		The municipal flag is a rectangular flag, divided vertically into two equal parts. One of them is white (with the municipal coat of arms) and the other is green.
Gmina Pszczółki		The municipal flag is a rectangular flag with proportions of 5:8, divided into three vertical stripes: two side stripes, green in colour, and the central part of the flag yellow in colour, in the middle of which the municipal coat of arms is placed.
Gmina Trąbki Wielkie		The municipal flag was established on 24 September 2002. It is a rectangular flag, divided vertically into two equal parts - yellow (with the municipal coat of arms) and red.

=== City of Gdynia ===
Flag	Description
	The flag of the city is a rectangular flag with the proportions of sides 3:5, equal on both sides, with two horizontally arranged fields, white at the top and turquoise at the bottom, symbolising the sky and the sea. The white field features the coat of arms of Gdynia.

=== Kartuzy County ===
Municipality	Flag	Description
City and gmina Kartuzy		The flag of the municipality (in the statute it appears as a pennant) is a rectangular flag, blue in colour, in the central part of the flag the coat of arms of Kartuzy is placed.
Gmina Sierakowice		The municipal flag is a rectangular flag, blue in colour, with proportions of 2:3. In the central part of the flag is the municipal coat of arms.
Gmina Przodkowo		The municipal flag is a rectangular flag in blue with the municipal coat of arms and the inscription ‘Przodkowo’ in purple underneath the coat of arms.

=== Kościerzyna County ===
Municipality	Flag	Description
Gmina Dziemiany		The municipality's flag is a rectangular flag with proportions of 2:3, divided into three horizontal stripes: white, yellow and blue. In the central part of the flag is the municipal coat of arms.
City of Kościerzyna		The city's flag was adopted by Resolution No. XV/96/95 of 6 September 1995. It is a rectangular flag, with proportions of 5:7, divided into two horizontal stripes of equal width - white and green. In the central part of the flag is the municipal coat of arms.
Gmina Kościerzyna		The municipality's flag is a rectangular flag with proportions of 5:8. It is made up of three horizontal stripes: yellow (occupying half of the flag, symbolising the sands and lands located within the municipality), blue (occupying 1/6 of the flag's area, referring to the lakes and rivers) and green (occupying 2/6 of the flag's width, referring to the forest areas).

=== Kwidzyn County ===
Municipality	Flag	Description
City of Kwidzyn		The flag of the municipality was established on 30 April 1998, Its author is Alfred Znamierowski. It is a rectangular flag, blue in colour with the coat of arms of Kwidzyn on top of three white lines (the central one thicker than the other side ones) located in the left part of the flag.
Gmina Kwidzyn		The municipal flag was established by Resolution No. VI/39/03. It is a rectangular flag, divided into three stripes: two green and one yellow. The central part of the flag features the municipal coat of arms.
City and gmina Prabuty		The municipal flag was established together with the coat of arms by Resolution No. V/22/2011 of 16 March 2011. It is a rectangular flag, with proportions 5:8, divided into three stripes - white (occupying half of the flag area), blue and green (of equal width). In the top left corner of the flag is the municipal coat of arms.
Gmina Sadlinki		The Municipal flag was established together with the coat of arms by Resolution No. VIII/45/2003 of 25 August 2003. It is a rectangular flag, white in colour, in the central part of the flag is the municipal coat of arms.

=== Lębork County ===
Municipality	Flag	Description
City of Lębork		The flag of the city is a rectangular flag with proportions of 5:3, blue in colour (symbolising the common name of the pre-war Lębork County - the Blue Land). In the central part of the flag is the town's coat of arms, with the inscription ‘Lębork’ below it.
City of Łeba		The city's flag is a rectangular flag, blue in colour, in the central part of the flag is the city's coat of arms.

=== Malbork County ===
Municipality	Flag	Description
Gmina Lichnowy		The municipal flag is a rectangular flag with proportions of 5:8. It is divided into two horizontal stripes of equal width - green and yellow. These colours also appear in the municipal coat of arms.
City of Malbork		The city flag is a rectangular flag with proportions of 5:8, divided into five horizontal stripes - red, yellow (representing 1/12 of the flag area each), white (1/2 of the area), yellow (1/12 of the area) and blue (2/12 of the area). In the central part of the flag is the municipal coat of arms.
Gmina Malbork		The municipal flag was established by Resolution No. X/72/07 of 13 June 2007. It is a rectangular flag, yellow in colour, with elements from the municipal coat of arms - a green willow and a blue wavy line below the willow, symbolising the Nogat River.
Gmina Miłoradz		The municipal flag was adopted on 25 November 2005. It is a rectangular flag, divided into three horizontal stripes of equal width: blue, yellow and green.
City and gmina Nowy Staw		The municipal flag was established by Resolution No. 238/97 of 26 June 1997. It is a rectangular flag with proportions of 5:8 and divided into three horizontal stripes - two narrow green ones and a wide white one. In the central part of the flag is the municipal coat of arms, around which is the inscription ‘Nowy Staw’.
Gmina Stare Pole		The municipal flag was established by Resolution No. XI/85/2004 of 30 March 2004. It is a rectangular flag with proportions of 5:8, divided into two horizontal stripes. The upper one, which constitutes 3/4 of the flag's surface, green in colour and contains the municipal coat of arms, while the lower one is yellow.

=== Nowy Dwór County ===
Municipality	Flag	Description
City and gmina Nowy Dwór Gdański		The municipal flag was established by Resolution No. 139/XX/96 of 28 June 1996. It is a rectangular flag with proportions of 5:8, consisting of two horizontal stripes - white (constituting one quarter of the flag's surface) and blue. The upper stripe features an element from the municipal coat of arms - three roses, symbolising former noble families.
Gmina Ostaszewo		The municipal flag was established by Resolution No. XXXVI/157/2009 of 17 September 2009. It is a rectangular flag with proportions of 5:8, consisting of two horizontal stripes - white (constituting 3/4 of the flag's surface) and green. In the central part of the flag is the municipal coat of arms.
Gmina Stegna		The municipal flag was established by Resolution No. XLVI/329/98 of 8 June 1998. It is a rectangular flag, divided into three equal horizontal stripes - blue, yellow and red.
Gmina Sztutowo		The municipal flag was established by Resolution No. XXVII/172/97 of 14 November 1997. It is a rectangular flag with proportions 5:8, divided into three equal horizontal stripes - blue, yellow and blue.

=== Puck County ===
Municipality	Flag	Description
City of Hel		The city's flag is a rectangular flag, blue in colour, with an aspect ratio of 16:9. In the upper left corner of the flag is a yellow key (symbolising its location at the entrance to the Bay of Gdansk) between two yellow stars. To the right side of the flag are three equal vertical yellow stripes.
City and gmina Jastarnia		The municipal flag is a rectangular flag, blue in colour with proportions of 7:11. In the central part of the flag is the municipal coat of arms.
Gmina Krokowa		The municipal flag is a rectangular piece of cloth with proportions of 3:4 and dimensions. It is divided into three equal horizontal stripes - blue, yellow and green. In the central part of the flag is an image of the Pomeranian Griffin.
City of Puck		The city flag is a rectangular flag with proportions 3:4, blue in colour, in the central part of the flag is the city coat of arms is placed.
City and gmina Władysławowo		The municipal flag was established by Resolution No. XVIII/138/96 of 16 February 1996. It is a rectangular flag, divided into four stripes - blue (occupying half of the flag area), two yellow and one black (of equal width). These colours are the heraldic colours of the Kashubian Land and also refer to the municipal coat of arms.

=== City of Słupsk ===
Flag	Description
	The city's flag was established by Resolution No. L/627/05 of 30 November 2005. It is a rectangular flag with proportions 5:8, white in colour, with red edge stripes of 0.22 values of the longer side. In the central part of the flag is the coat of arms of the city.

=== Słupsk County ===
Municipality	Flag	Description
Gmina Damnica		The municipal flag was established by Resolution No. VII/38/03 of 15 May 2003. It is a rectangular flag, green in colour, with a silver stripe in its lower part. In the upper left corner of the flag is a golden oak - an element from the municipal coat of arms.
The city of Kępice and gmina Kępice		The municipality's flag was established by Resolution No. XXIV/217/2017 of 30 March 2017. It is a rectangular flag, white in colour, in the centre of the flag is the municipality's coat of arms.
Gmina Kobylnica		The municipal flag was established on 3 May 1995, again by Resolution No. X/105/99 of 31 August 1999. It is a rectangular flag, divided into three vertical stripes two green and one white. In the central part of the flag is the municipal coat of arms.
Gmina Potęgowo		The municipal flag was established by Resolution No. XXV/183/2001 of 27 April 2001. It is a rectangular flag with proportions of 5:8, on which the coat of arms from the municipal coat of arms is placed - a fishtail on a white background. Below the coat of arms, at the bottom of the flag, there is a full-length stripe 1/5 of the width of the shorter side of the flag. This stripe is made up of four equal rectangles of the following colours (looking from the spar): gold, red, gold, red.
Gmina Redzikowo		The municipality's flag was established by Resolution No. XXI/216/2020 of 20 May 2020. It is a rectangular flag with proportions of 5:8, divided into three stripes two green and red. In the central part of the flag is a red stripe in which the municipal coat of arms is placed.
City of Ustka		The city flag is a rectangular flag with proportions of 5:8, divided into 5 horizontal stripes (yellow, blue, white, blue, yellow).
Gmina Ustka		The municipal flag was established by Resolution No. III/17/2001 of 16 March 2001. It is a rectangular flag with proportions of 5:8, composed of two horizontal stripes of equal width, red at the top and blue at the bottom. In the central part of the flag is the municipal coat of arms.

=== City of Sopot ===
Flag	Description
	The flag of the city was originally adopted in 1904, after changes in 1994. It is a rectangular flag with side proportions of 5:8, both sides identical, with two horizontally arranged fields, blue at the top and gold at the bottom. The proportions of the width of the blue field to the gold field are 1:1. In the centre of the flag field are placed the white seagull and the white fish from the city coat of arms.

=== Starogard County ===
Municipality	Flag	Description
Gmina Kaliska		The municipality's flag is a rectangular piece of cloth with proportions of 5:8, white in colour. In the central part of the flag the municipal coat of arms is placed.
Gmina Osiek		The municipality's flag was established by Resolution No. XXV/147/2009 of 25 August 2009. It is a rectangular flag with proportions of 5:8, green in colour, divided into two stripes: blue and white. In the left part of the flag is the figure of St James.
Gmina Skórcz		The municipal flag is a rectangular flag, divided into two horizontal or vertical stripes of equal width - yellow and green. In the central part of the flag features the municipal coat of arms.
City of Starogard Gdański		The city's flag is a rectangular flag in the proportion of 7:12, yellow in colour with the city's coat of arms in the middle. It has three official versions.
Gmina Starogard Gdański		The municipality's flag is a rectangular piece of fabric of light violet colour, in the central part of which the municipal coat of arms is placed.

=== Sztum County ===
Municipality	Flag	Description
City and gmina Sztum		The municipality's flag is a white stripe on a red field and is identical to the Austrian flag. The flag is a souvenir of the visit of Archduke Albrecht III Habsburg, who supported the Teutonic Order during its expedition to Żmudź. As a gift, the archduke left money for the expansion of the castle in the form of a tower, which was named after him, and his coat-of-arms colours.
Gmina Stary Dzierzgoń		The municipality's flag, selected in a 2005 competition and designed by Tomasz Kipka, is a rectangular flag divided into three horizontal stripes - yellow, black and blue. In the central part of the flag is the municipal coat of arms.
Gmina Stary Targ		The municipal flag is a rectangular flag, divided into four horizontal stripes - two wide (yellow at the top and brown at the bottom) and two narrow ones in between (celadon and brick-red). The wide stripes (occupying 3/8 of the surface of the flag) reflect the colours of the fields of which the municipal coat of arms is composed, while the narrow stripes (constituting 1/8 of the surface of the flag) are the colours of the outline of the tower of the parish church of St. Simon and St. Jude Thaddeus in Stary Targ (the celadon colour is that of the church tower's helmet, and the brick-red one refers to its brick part).

=== Tczew County ===
Municipality	Flag	Description
City and gmina Gniew		The municipal flag was established by Resolution No. XXIX/171/96 of 28 November 1996. It is a rectangular flag with proportions of 5:8, divided into three horizontal stripes - blue, green and yellow. In the central part of the flag is the municipal coat of arms.
Gmina Morzeszczyn		The municipal flag was established by Resolution No. XVI/95/2000 of 31 May 2000. It is a rectangular flag, divided into two equal horizontal stripes - yellow and green. In the central part of the flag is the municipal coat of arms.
City and gmina Pelplin		The municipality's flag is a rectangular flag, divided into four equal rectangles - two blue (upper left and lower right corners) and two white. They are divided by a yellow cross.
City of Tczew		The city's flag is a rectangular flag with proportions of 5:7, white in colour. In the central part of the flag is an image of a red griffin with a yellow beak and claws, taken from the city coat of arms.

=== Wejherowo County ===
Municipality	Flag	Description
Gmina Choczewo		The municipality's flag was adopted by acclamation on 12 June 1997, but was not endorsed by any resolution. It is a rectangular flag with proportions of 5:8, divided into three equal horizontal stripes - white, red and blue.
Gmina Luzino		The municipal flag was established by Resolution No. XXV/331/2006 of 10 October 2006. It is a rectangular flag with proportions of 5:8, divided into three equal horizontal stripes - black, yellow and blue. In the central part of the flag is the municipal coat of arms.
City of Reda		The city flag was established by Resolution No. XIX/146/96 of 6 February 1996. It is a rectangular flag, divided into three horizontal stripes - white, yellow and blue in the ratio of 1:1:2.
City of Rumia		The city's flag is a rectangular flag, blue in colour with proportions of 3:5, on which is the city's coat of arms and a white ribbon symbolising he Zagórska Struga River.
City of Wejherowo		The town's flag was established by virtue of resolution no. XXXII/386/93 of 18 May 1993. It is a rectangular flag with proportions of 3:5 divided into two vertical stripes: blue and white, the blue stripe is twice as wide and is located at the spar and the white one at the edge of the flag. On the blue field which also serves as a shield there are elements of Wejherowo's coat of arms: a Maltese cross and a rose.

== Unofficial flags ==
=== Puck County ===
Municipality	Flag	Description
Gmina Puck		The unofficial flag of the municipality, used by the authorities and during the celebrations of the 30th anniversary of the municipality, it is a rectangular flag, blue in colour, in which is placed the emblem from the municipal coat of arms, supplemented by two yellow horizontal stripes at the end of the flag.

== See also ==
- Flags of counties in the Pomeranian Voivodeship
