= Walter Maass =

Nazi Party politician and SS officer (1901–unknown)

Deputy Gauleiter and Acting Gauleiter Free City of Danzig
- In office 20 August 1928 – 1 March 1929
- Preceded by: Hans Albert Hohnfeldt
- Succeeded by: Erich Koch

Member of the Volkstag Free City of Danzig
- In office 16 November 1930 – 1 September 1939

Personal details
- Born: Walter Gustav Julius Maass; 30 August 1901 Kordeshagen, Province of Pomerania, Kingdom of Prussia, German Empire
- Died: unknown
- Party: Nazi Party (NSDAP)
- Other political affiliations: Organisation Consul; Deutschvölkischer Schutz- und Trutzbund; German Social Party
- Profession: Civil servant
- Awards: Brunswick Rally Badge; Golden Party Badge; Blood Order

Military service
- Allegiance: Weimar Republic
- Branch/service: Reichswehr
- Years of service: 1919–1920
- Rank: Gefreiter
- Unit: Artillery Regiment 2

Walter Gustav Julius Maass (30 August 1901 – unknown) was a Nazi Party politician who served briefly as the Deputy Gauleiter and the acting Gauleiter in the Free City of Danzig, and as a member of the Danzig parliament from 1930 to 1939. He was also a member of the Schutzstaffel (SS) throughout the Nazi regime. He rose to the rank of SS-Sturmbannführer and worked for the SS security service in Danzig and in the Reich Security Main Office in Berlin.

== Early life ==
Born in Kordeshagen (today, Dobrzyca) the son of a carpenter, Maass went to the district boys' school in Danzig (today Gdańsk) from 1907 to 1915, and then was apprenticed to a lawyer and notary in Danzig until July 1917. He worked as an assistant to the Magistrate of Danzig until January 1919 when he entered military service. He served as a cannoneer in Artillery Regiment 2 of the Reichswehr until discharged with the rank of Gefreiter on 31 October 1920. He then worked as an assistant office manager to a notary in Danzig until 31 August 1922. He left that job to become an administrative clerk with the state Customs Office, a position he would hold until 1933.

Drawn to right-wing politics, Maass was a member of the Organisation Consul, an ultra-nationalist and antisemitic terrorist group, between January and August 1921. In July 1921, he joined the Deutschvölkischer Schutz- und Trutzbund, the largest, most active, and most influential antisemitic federation in Germany. On 21 August 1921, he co-founded the Deutschvölkischer Wanderbund, a forerunner of the paramilitary Sturmabteilung (SA) in Danzig. He became a member of the German Social Party, an antsemitic and Völkisch organization in 1922. In 1924, he joined the Frontbann, an SA front organization formed while the SA was banned. He later joined the SA after the ban was lifted and served until 1931.

== Nazi Party career in Danzig ==
Maass joined the Nazi Party on 2 November 1925 (membership number 21,821) after the ban on it was lifted. As an early member, he would later be awarded the Golden Party Badge. He was one of the leading Nazis in Gau Danzig and served as the Gau's Deputy SA-Führer from 1927 to 1928. During this time, he was also the chairman of the local USCHLA, the Party investigation and disciplinary tribunal. The Gauleiter of Gau Danzig, Hans Albert Hohnfeldt, resigned on 20 June 1928. After a brief interregnum, Maass was selected to be the Deputy Gauleiter on 20 August, and was temporarily put in charge as the acting Gauleiter. On 1 March 1929, Maass was replaced by Erich Koch. Maass later served as the Gau propaganda leader from March 1931 to March 1933.

On 16 November 1930, Maass was elected to the Danzig Volkstag (parliament) where he would serve until its dissolution on 1 September 1939 when Danzig was annexed by Nazi Germany. As an attendee at the October 1931 SA rally in Braunschweig, Maass was severely injured when he was struck in the head by a hatchet, requiring the insertion of a metal plate in his skull, and he was awarded the Brunswick Rally Badge. Maass also was awarded the Blood Order on 31 March 1939, in recognition of his injury in the service of the Party. On 15 March 1933, Maass was dismissed from his position in the Danzig Customs Office for his part in a violent demonstration that resulted in breaking the windows at the Social Democratic newspaper, Danziger Volksstimme. He then served for a time as a clerical employee of the Volkstag until 1 November 1933 when, having passed the necessary examination, he became a Volkstag Obersekretär (senior secretary).

== SS career ==
In addition to his political career, Maass was a long-serving member of the Schutzstaffel (SS) which he joined on 15 January 1933 (SS number 46,058). He led SS-Sturm (company-level) formations of the 36th SS-Standarte in Danzig between January 1934 and June 1937. From June to December 1937 he commanded a Sturmbann (battalion) of the 71st SS-Standarte in Zoppot (today, Sopot). Between then and May 1940, Maass was assigned to SS-Stammabteilung (main department) "Nordost". From March 1934, he held the rank of SS-Sturmführer (later redesignated SS-Untersturmführer). On 25 April 1936, he was promoted to SS-Obersturmführer and, on 20 April 1939, to SS-Hauptsturmführer.

On 1 May 1940, Maass was assigned to the SS-Sicherheitsdienst (Security Service, SD) district office in Danzig with the rank of SS-Sturmbannführer. On 15 January 1943, he was briefly attached to the staff of the SS-Oberabschnitt (main district) "Ostland" in the Reichskommissariat Ostland. Lastly, on 1 April 1943, he was transferred to the Reich Security Main Office in Berlin where it is believed he served until the end of the Second World War. No additional details are known about his fate.

== Sources ==
- Miller, Michael D.; Schulz, Andreas (2017). Gauleiter: The Regional Leaders of the Nazi Party and Their Deputies, 1925-1945. Vol. 2 (Georg Joel – Dr. Bernhard Rust). R. James Bender Publishing. ISBN 978-1-932-97032-6.
