= Wilhelm Stich =

German Nazi Party official (1894 – unknown)

Gauleiter of Gau East Prussia
- In office 6 December 1925 – 1 February 1926
- Preceded by: Position established
- Succeeded by: Bruno Gustav Scherwitz

Personal details
- Born: 26 November 1894 Rogahlen, East Prussia, Kingdom of Prussia, German Empire
- Died: Unknown
- Party: Nazi Party
- Other political affiliations: National Socialist Working Association
- Occupation: Commercial clerk

Wilhelm Stich (26 November 1894 – unknown) was a German Nazi Party official who briefly served as the first Gauleiter of Gau East Prussia in the Party's early days. He was dismissed and expelled from the Party in February 1926 after only two months, but was allowed to re-enroll in 1928. No additional details of his life are documented.

== Life ==
Stich was born in Rogahlen in East Prussia (today, Rogale in Poland). He was the son of a salesman, also named Wilhelm Stich, and his wife, Wilhelmine Dublaski. Not much is known about his education and early life. He was employed as a commercial clerk in Königsberg, the East Prussian capital and, on 8 April 1920, married Herta Maria Stich, daughter of August Stich and Justine Kimm.

Stich joined the Nazi Party in 1925 (membership number 18,327) shortly after the lifting of the ban that had been imposed on it in the wake of the failed Beer Hall Putsch of November 1923. He was a co-founder of the Ortsgruppe (local group) in Königsberg in 1925 and became the Ortsgruppenleiter . On 6 December 1925, Gau East Prussia was officially established and Stich became its first Gauleiter. Stich also formed a branch of the National Socialist Working Association in Königsberg. This was an association of northern and northwestern Gauleiter who belonged to the "revolutionary" left-wing of the Party, as opposed to the more moderate wing that supported participation in electoral politics.

By early 1926, Stich had been ousted from his Gauleiter position due to his inability to solve the financial problems of the Gau. He was succeeded by Bruno Gustav Scherwitz on 1 February 1926. Stich also was expelled from the Party but was permitted to re-enroll in 1928. No further details of his life are documented.

== Sources ==
- Miller, Michael D.; Schulz, Andreas (2021). Gauleiter: The Regional Leaders of the Nazi Party and Their Deputies, 1925–1945. Vol. 3 (Fritz Sauckel – Hans Zimmermann). Fonthill Media. ISBN 978-1-781-55826-3.
- Orlow, Dietrich (1969). The History of the Nazi Party: 1919–1933. University of Pittsburgh Press. ISBN 0-8229-3183-4.
