= Erich Koch =

Nazi leader (1896–1986)

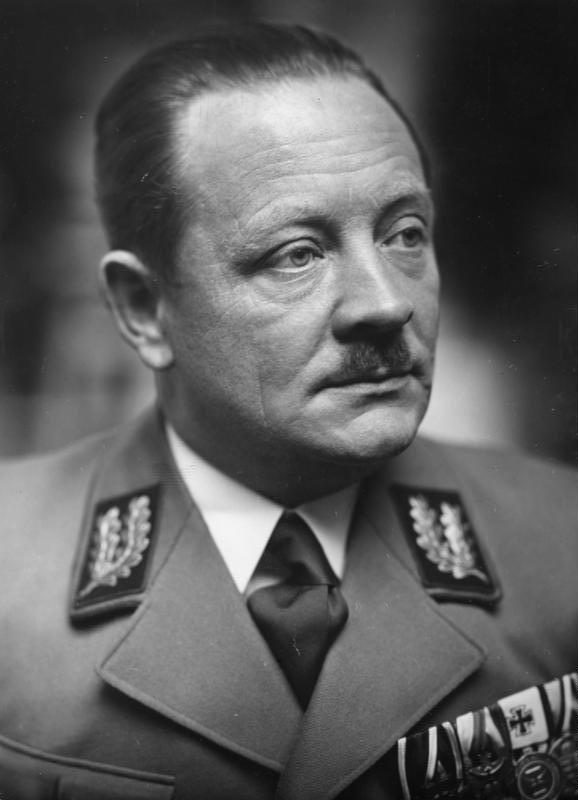
- Koch in 1941

Gauleiter of Gau East Prussia
- In office 1 October 1928 – 23 April 1945
- Leader: Adolf Hitler
- Preceded by: Hans Albert Hohnfeldt (acting)
- Succeeded by: Position Abolished

Oberpräsident of East Prussia
- In office 2 June 1933 – 23 April 1945
- Preceded by: Wilhelm Kutscher
- Succeeded by: Position Abolished

Reichskommissar for Ukraine
- In office 1 September 1941 – 10 November 1944
- Appointed by: Adolf Hitler
- Preceded by: Position Established
- Succeeded by: Position Abolished

Reichskommissar for the Ostland
- In office 21 September 1944 – 21 January 1945 (de facto ousted 13 October 1944)
- Appointed by: Adolf Hitler
- Preceded by: Hinrich Lohse
- Succeeded by: Position Abolished

Additional positions
- 1933–1945: Member of the Greater German Reichstag
- 1930–1933: Member of the Reichstag

Personal details
- Born: 19 June 1896 Elberfeld, German Empire
- Died: 12 November 1986 (aged 90) Barczewo Prison, Barczewo, Polish People's Republic
- Party: Nazi Party
- Conviction(s): War crimes
- Criminal penalty: Death; commuted to life imprisonment

Military service
- Allegiance: German Empire
- Branch/service: Imperial German Army; Freikorps Roßbach
- Years of service: 1915–1918
- Battles/wars: World War I

Erich Koch (German: [ˈɛʁɪç kɔx]; 19 June 1896 – 12 November 1986) was a Gauleiter of the Nazi Party (NSDAP) in East Prussia from 1 October 1928 until 1945. Between 1941 and 1945 he was Chief of Civil Administration (Chef der Zivilverwaltung) of Bezirk Bialystok. During this period, he was also the Reichskommissar in Reichskommissariat Ukraine from September 1941 until August 1944 and in Reichskommissariat Ostland from September 1944. After the Second World War, Koch stood trial in Poland and was convicted in 1959 of war crimes and sentenced to death. The sentence was later commuted to life in prison and Koch died of natural causes in his cell at the Barczewo prison on 12 November 1986.

== Early life and First World War ==
Koch was born in Elberfeld, today part of Wuppertal, as the son of foreman Gustav Adolf Koch (1862–1932) and his wife Henriette, née Matthes (1863–1939). In World War I he served as a soldier from 1915 to the end of the war in 1918. He later fought as a member of Freikorps Roßbach in Upper Silesia. A skilled trader, Koch joined the railway service as an aspirant for the middle level of the civil service. He was dismissed from this position in 1926 for anti-Weimar Republic activities.

== Rise in the Nazi Party ==
Koch joined the NSDAP in 1922 (member #90). From 1922 he worked in various party positions in the NSDAP Gau Ruhr, including as Business Manager. During the Occupation of the Ruhr, he was a member of Albert Leo Schlageter's group and was imprisoned several times by the French authorities. He belonged to the left wing of the party and was a supporter of the faction led by Gregor Strasser. He became a member of the National Socialist Working Association, a short-lived group of north and northwest German Gaue, organized and led by Strasser, which unsuccessfully sought to amend the Party program. It was dissolved in 1926 following the Bamberg Conference.

On 22 March 1926, Koch became a Bezirksleiter of the NSDAP in Essen and, in October of that year, succeeded Joseph Goebbels as Business Manager of Großgau Ruhr. In 1927, he succeeded Viktor Lutze as the Deputy Gauleiter there.

== Gauleiter of East Prussia ==
In October 1928, Koch became Gauleiter of the Province of East Prussia and, in November 1929, the leader of the NSDAP faction in the provincial Landtag. In September 1930, he was elected as a member of the Reichstag for electoral constituency 1 (East Prussia) and he would hold this seat until the fall of the Nazi regime in May 1945. After the Machtergreifung, Koch was appointed to the Prussian State Council in July 1933. He became Oberpräsident of East Prussia on 2 June 1933 (acting until September) replacing Wilhelm Kutscher. He thus united under his control the highest party and governmental offices in the province. In November 1938 Koch was appointed SA-Obergruppenführer.

Koch's pre-war rule in East Prussia was characterized by efforts to collectivize the local agriculture and ruthlessness in dealing with his critics inside and outside the Party. He also had long-term plans for mass-scale industrialization of the largely agricultural province. These actions made him unpopular among the local peasants. However, through publicly funded emergency relief programs concentrating on agricultural land-improvement projects and road construction, the "Erich Koch Plan" for East Prussia allegedly made the province free of unemployment; on August 16, 1933, Koch reported to Hitler that unemployment had been banished entirely from East Prussia, a feat that gained admiration throughout the Reich.

Koch's industrialization plans led him into conflict with Richard Walther Darré, who held the office of the Reich Peasant Leader (Reichsbauernführer) and Minister of Agriculture. Darré, a neopaganist rural romantic, wanted to enforce his vision of an agricultural East Prussia. When his "Land" representatives challenged Koch's plans, Koch had them arrested.

== Second World War ==
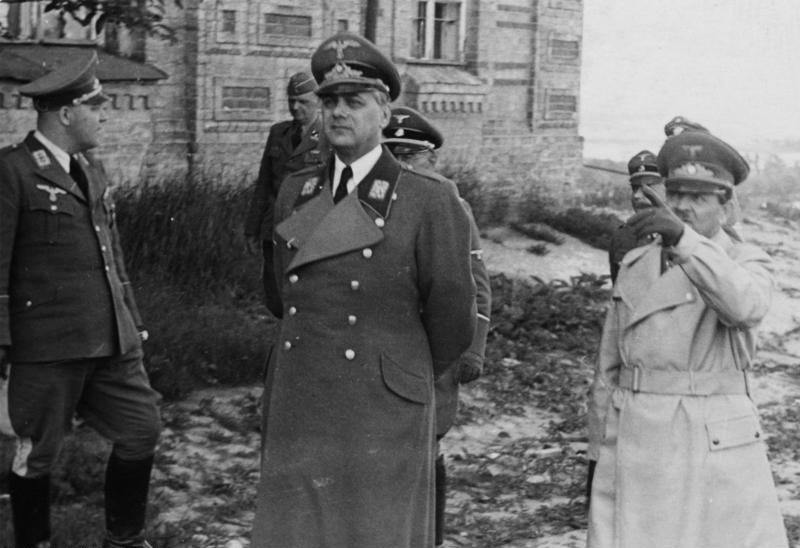
Erich Koch (right) and Alfred Rosenberg (center) in Kiev, Reichskommissariat Ukraine

At the commencement of World War II on 1 September 1939, Koch was appointed Reich Defense Commissioner (Reichsverteidigungskommissar) for Wehrkreis (Military District) I, which comprised East Prussia. On 26 October 1939, after the end of the Invasion of Poland, the territory of his Gau was adjusted. Regierungsbezirk West Prussia was transferred from East Prussia to the new Reichsgau Westpreußen, later renamed Reichsgau Danzig-West Prussia. East Prussia was compensated with Regierungsbezirk Zichenau (previously Ciechanów). These new areas lay approximately between the rivers Vistula and Narew.

In March 1940 Theodor Schieder, who was director in charge of Regional Office for Postwar History (Landesstelle für Nachkriegsgeschichte), presented Gauleiter Erich Koch with a detailed plan regarding studies of territories annexed to East Prussia; Koch himself wanted to know political, social and ethnic conditions in those areas. Schieder in return sent two reports to Koch, including a population inventory conducted at the end of 19th century of the area in question, which was most relevant to Nazi policies of extermination and settlement, and provided basis for segregation of Jewish and "Slavic" spouses from ethnic Germans in the German Volksliste.

Soon after the invasion of the Soviet Union, Koch was appointed "civil commissioner" (Zivilkommissar) on 1 August 1941, and later as Chief of Civil Administration in Bezirk Bialystok.

In 1942, Gauleiter Erich Koch expressed thanks to Theodor Schieder for his help in Nazi operations in annexed Poland writing: "As a director of 'Landesstelle Ostpreußen für Nachkriegsgeschichte' you have provided material that provided significant service in our fight against Poles and continues to help us in establishing new order today in Regierungsbezirke Zichenau and Bialystok."

On 1 September 1941, Koch became Reichskommissar of Reichskommissariat Ukraine with control of the Gestapo and the uniformed police. His domain now extended from the Baltic to the Black Sea; it comprised ethnic German, Polish, Belarus and Ukrainian areas. As Reichskommissar he had full authority in his realm, which led to conflict with other elements of the Nazi bureaucracy. Alfred Rosenberg, Reich Minister for the Occupied Eastern Territories (Reichsministerium für die besetzten Ostgebiete), expressed his disapproval of Koch's autonomous actions to Hitler in December 1941.

Koch's first act as Reichskommissar was to close local schools, declaring that "Ukraine children need no schools. What they'll have to learn will be taught them by their German masters." His brutality is exemplified by his remarks, referring to Ukrainians as "niggers", and saying "If I meet a Ukrainian worthy of being seated at my table, I must have him shot." Koch worked together with the General Plenipotentiary for Labour Deployment (Generalbevollmächtigter für den Arbeitseinsatz) Fritz Sauckel in providing the Reich with forced labor. He was also involved in the persecution of Polish and Ukrainian Jews. Due to his brutal actions, Nazi rule in Ukraine was disturbed by a growing number of partisan uprisings.

Statements about the Germans as a Herrenvolk (master race) belong to the Nazi officials of various ranks. In particular when Reichskommissar Ukraine Koch said:

We are a master race, which must remember that the lowliest German worker is racially and biologically a thousand times more valuable than the population here.

— Erich Koch, March 5th 1943,

On 21 September 1944, Koch succeeded Hinrich Lohse as Reichskommissar for the Ostland, overseeing the Nazi administration in the Baltic States. On October 13, 1944, Riga, the capital of the Reichskommissariat and head of the region, was re-captured by Soviet forces. Koch was appointed as head of the Volkssturm of East Prussia on 25 November 1944. As the Red Army advanced into his area during 1945, Koch initially fled Königsberg to Berlin at the end of January after condemning the Wehrmacht for attempting a similar breakout from East Prussia. He then returned to the far safer town of Pillau, "where he made a great show of organizing the marine evacuation using Kriegsmarine radio communications, before once more getting away himself" by escaping through this Baltic Sea port on 23 April 1945 on the icebreaker Ostpreußen. From Pillau through Hel Peninsula, Rügen, and Copenhagen he arrived at Flensburg, where he hid himself after unsuccessfully demanding that a U-boat take him to South America. He was captured by British forces in Hamburg in May 1949.

== Trial and imprisonment ==
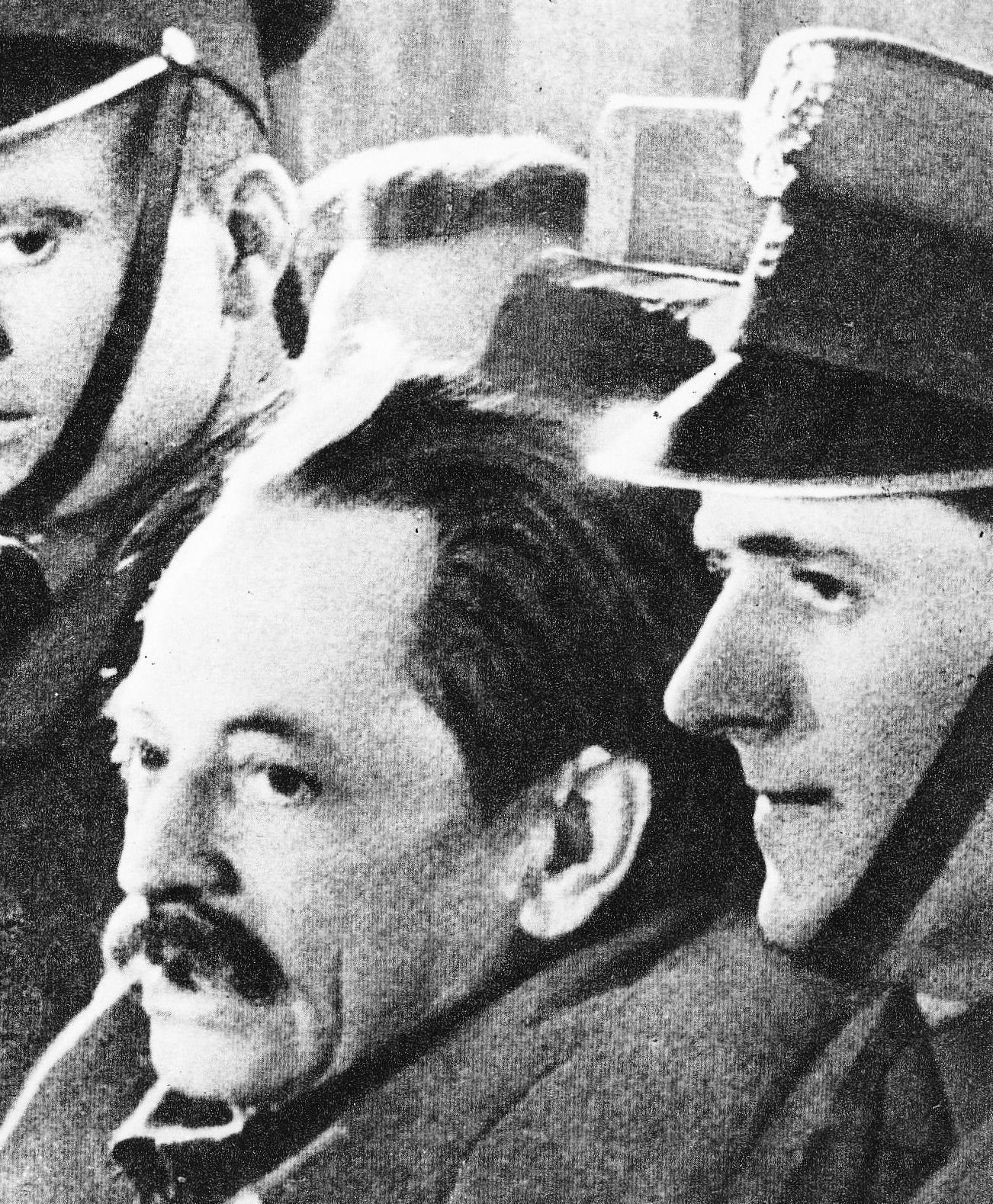
Erich Koch during his trial in Poland

The Soviet Union demanded Koch's extradition, but the British government decided to pass him on to the Communist Polish government instead. On 14 January 1950 he was handed over by the British to a prison in Warsaw, the Mokotów Prison, where he remained imprisoned for another eight years before his trial began on 19 October 1958. He faced charges of war crimes for the extermination of 400,000 Poles, but was never indicted for his crimes in Ukraine.

Found guilty of these crimes, he was sentenced to death on 9 March 1959 by the district court in Warsaw for having planned, prepared and organized the mass murder of civilians.

His sentence was commuted to life imprisonment due to ill health, although many believe he was spared because the Soviets thought he possessed information about art looted by the Nazis during the war; in particular, information about the whereabouts of the Amber Room of Tsarskoye Selo palace near Leningrad which had been dismantled on Koch's direct orders. The Soviets believed he had ordered parts of this famous room to be hidden on board the Wilhelm Gustloff cruise liner, which was torpedoed and sunk by the Soviets in the Baltic whilst evacuating German refugees from East Prussia in early 1945. Salvage attempts by both Soviet and Polish diving teams in the 1950s revealed no evidence to substantiate this theory.

Koch appeared in a television report on Königsberg's history in 1986, interviewed by West German journalists in his Polish prison cell. He remained unrepentant to the end, arguing that he would never have surrendered the city of Königsberg as "it was a matter of honour". He died shortly thereafter of natural causes in Barczewo prison (formerly Wartenburg in East Prussia) at the age of 90, as the last war criminal to serve a term in Poland. He was buried in an unmarked grave at the local prison cemetery.

== Koch and Christianity ==
Koch was one of the openly Christian Nazi Party members. In addition to his political career, Koch was also the elected praeses of the Synod of the old-Prussian Ecclesiastical Province of East Prussia. Although Koch gave preference to the Deutsche Christen Movement over traditional Protestantism, his contemporaries regarded Koch as a bona fide Christian, whose success in his church career could be attributed to his commitment to the Lutheran faith.

Koch officially resigned his church membership in 1943, but in his post-war testimony he stated: "I held the view that the Nazi idea had to develop from a basic Prussian-Protestant attitude and from Luther's unfinished Protestant Reformation." On the 450th anniversary of Luther's birth (10 November 1933), Koch spoke on the circumstances surrounding Luther's birthday. He implied that the Machtergreifung was an act of divine will and stated that both Luther and Hitler struggled in the name of belief.

It has been speculated that Koch's conflicts with Rosenberg and Darré had a religious element to them.

== See also ==
- Günther Vollmer – Koch's Attorney General in Königsberg

== Sources ==
- Медведев Д.Н. Сильные духом /Вступ. ст. А. В. Цессарского; Ил. И. Л. Ушакова. — М.: Правда, 1985. — 512 с, ил. (Medvedev D.N. Strong in spirit / Ingress. Art. A.V. Tsessarsky; Il. IL Ushakova. - M .: Pravda, 1985. - 512 s, ill.)
- Michael D. Miller & Andreas Schulz: Gauleiter: The Regional Leaders of the Nazi Party and Their Deputies, 1925-1945, Volume II (Georg Joel - Dr. Bernhard Rust). R. James Bender Publishing, 2017. ISBN 1-932970-32-0.
- Volkmann, Hans-Erich, ed. Das Russlandbild im Dritten Reich. Köln: Böhlau, 1994.
- Wistrich, Robert S. Who's who in Nazi Germany. New York: Routledge, 2001.
