= Bruno Gustav Scherwitz =

German Nazi Party official and Luftwaffe officer (1896–1985)

Gauleiter of Gau East Prussia
- In office 1 February 1926 – March 1927
- Preceded by: Wilhelm Stich
- Succeeded by: Hans Albert Hohnfeldt

Personal details
- Born: 22 June 1896 Labiau, East Prussia, Kingdom of Prussia, German Empire
- Died: 23 October 1985 (aged 89) Braunschweig, West Germany
- Party: Nazi Party
- Occupation: Salesman

Military service
- Allegiance: German Empire; Nazi Germany
- Branch/service: Imperial German Army; Luftwaffe
- Years of service: 1914–1918; 1939–1945
- Rank: Leutnant; Major
- Unit: Reserve Infantry Regiment 204; Luftwaffe Protection Battalion I
- Battles/wars: World War I World War II • Battle of Stalingrad
- Awards: Iron Cross, 1st and 2nd class Clasp to the Iron Cross, 1st and 2nd class Wound Badge, in black

Bruno Gustav Scherwitz (22 June 1896 – 23 October 1985) was a German Nazi Party official who served as the Gauleiter of Gau East Prussia in the Party's early years, until he was removed from that post and expelled from the Party. During the Second World War, he served as a Luftwaffe officer from 1939 to 1942 when he was seriously wounded at the Battle of Stalingrad.

== Early life ==
Scherwitz was born in Labiau in East Prussia (now in the Polessky District, Poland), the son of a locksmith and factory owner. He was educated in the local Volksschule and Gymnasium until 1914. On the outbreak of the First World War, he entered military service with the Imperial German Army as a one-year volunteer. He fought with Reserve Infantry Regiment 204, and attained the rank of Leutnant of reserves. He was wounded in action and awarded the Iron Cross, 1st and 2nd class and the Wound Badge, in black. Returning to civilian life after the war, he was employed as a salesman.

== Nazi Party career ==
On 10 September 1925, Scherwitz became a member of the Nazi Party (membership number 18,325). He was a participant in the founding assembly of Gau East Prussia on 6 December 1925 in Königsberg. When the first Gauleiter of East Prussia, Wilhelm Stich, was unable to solve the financial problems of the Gau, he was removed from office. On 1 February 1926, Scherwitz was appointed as the new Gauleiter by Gregor Strasser, who at the time was the chief organizer for the Party in northern Germany.

However, in March 1927, Scherwitz was removed from his post. He was succeeded by Hans Albert Hohnfeldt, the Gauleiter of the neighboring Free City of Danzig, who took over temporarily as acting Gauleiter. Furthermore, on 27 September 1927 Scherwitz was expelled from the Party in a decree issued by Adolf Hitler. This notice of expulsion was published in the Völkische Beobachter on 5 October.

== Luftwaffe service ==
Not much is known of Scherwitz's life until June 1939, when he joined the Luftwaffe with the rank of Hauptmann in the reserves. He served as the commander of Luftwaffe Protection Battalion I on the eastern front. He was promoted to Major on 1 September 1942, shortly before being seriously wounded in the Battle of Stalingrad on the 20th of that month. During his war service he was awarded the Clasp to the Iron Cross, 1st and 2nd class, and the Wound Badge. After recuperating, he was transferred to the army in late 1943 or 1944, but no further details of his life are documented. He died on 23 October 1985.

== Sources ==
- Höffkes, Karl (1986). Hitlers Politische Generale. Die Gauleiter des Dritten Reiches: ein biographisches Nachschlagewerk. Tübingen: Grabert-Verlag. ISBN 3-87847-163-7.
- Miller, Michael D.; Schulz, Andreas (2012). Gauleiter: The Regional Leaders of the Nazi Party and Their Deputies, 1925–1945. Vol. 1 (Herbert Albrecht – H. Wilhelm Hüttmann). R. James Bender Publishing. ISBN 978-1-932-97021-0.
- Miller, Michael D.; Schulz, Andreas (2021). Gauleiter: The Regional Leaders of the Nazi Party and Their Deputies, 1925–1945. Vol. 3 (Fritz Sauckel – Hans Zimmermann). Fonthill Media. ISBN 978-1-781-55826-3.
- Orlow, Dietrich (1969). The History of the Nazi Party: 1919–1933. University of Pittsburgh Press. ISBN 0-8229-3183-4.
