= Gau East Prussia =

Administrative division of Nazi Germany

- Gau of Nazi Germany
- 1925–1945
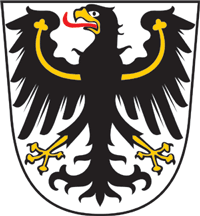
- Flag Coat of arms

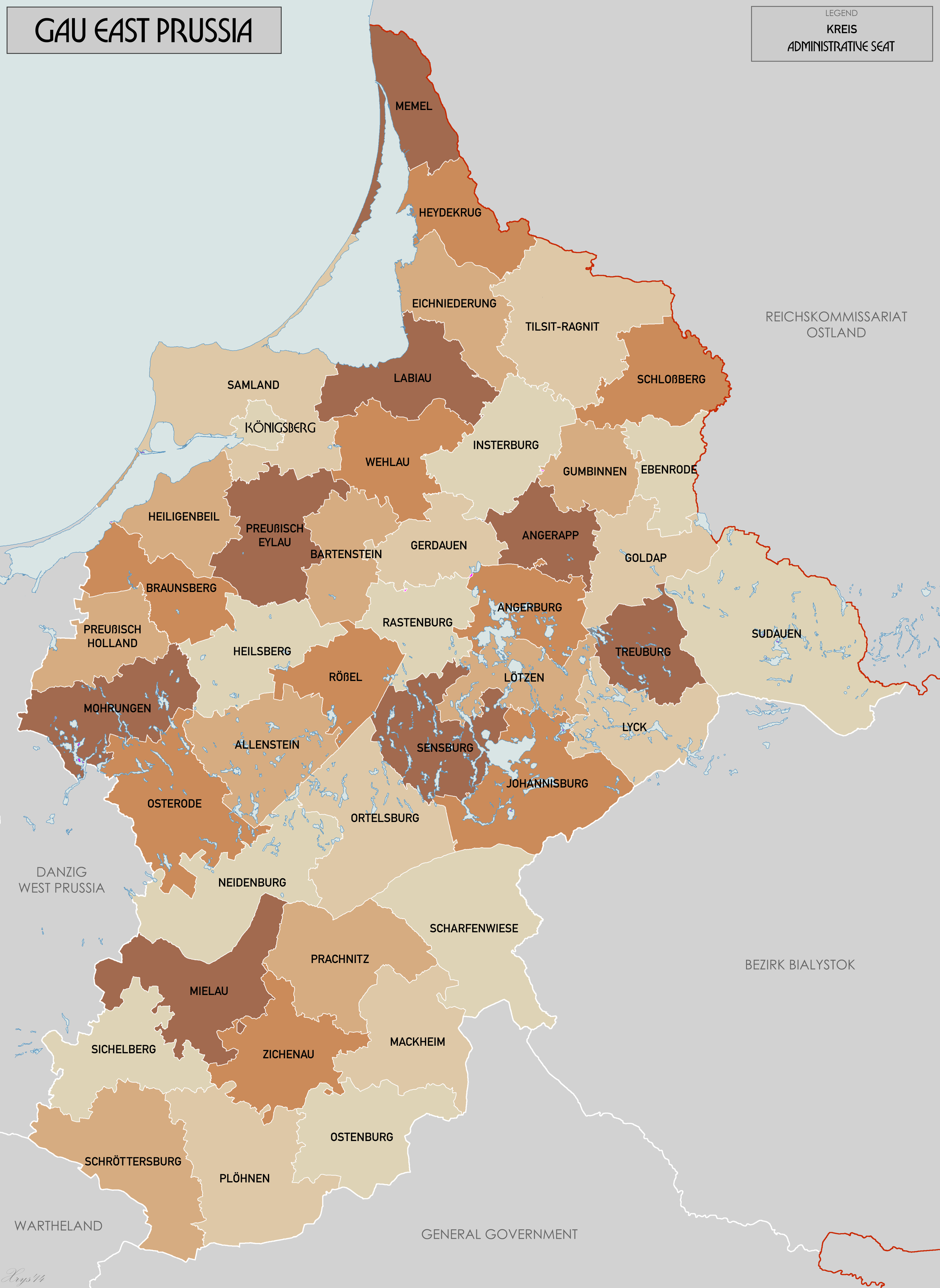
- Map of Gau East Prussia
- Capital: Königsberg (now Kaliningrad)
- Area
  - 1941: 48,867 km^{2} (18,868 sq mi)
- Population
  - 1941: 2,119,879
- Government
- Gauleiter
  - 1925–1926: Wilhelm Stich
  - 1926–1927: Bruno Gustav Scherwitz
  - 1927–1928: Hans Albert Hohnfeldt (acting)
  - 1928–1945: Erich Koch
- History
  - Establishment: 6 December 1925
  - Disestablishment: 1 August 1945
Preceded by
| Province of East Prussia |
| Klaipėda Region |
| Warsaw Voivodeship (1919–1939) |
| Białystok Voivodeship (1919–1939) |
Succeeded by
| Reichsgau Danzig-West Prussia |
| Byelorussian Soviet Socialist Republic |
| Lithuanian Soviet Socialist Republic |
| Russian Soviet Federative Socialist Republic |
| People's Republic of Poland |
- Today part of: Belarus; Poland; Lithuania; Russia (Kaliningrad Oblast)

Gau East Prussia (German: Ostpreußen) was an administrative division of Nazi Germany encompassing the province of East Prussia in the Free State of Prussia from 1933 to 1945. Before that, from 1925 to 1933, it was the regional subdivision of the Nazi Party in that area, having been established at a conference in Königsberg on 6 December 1925. In 1939, Gau East Prussia expanded following the annexation of the Klaipėda Region from Lithuania and the occupation of Poland, while a sliver of territory from the gau was transferred to Reichsgau Danzig-West Prussia. After Germany's attack on the USSR, the Belarusian city of Hrodna (German: Garten) also became part of the Gau.

After the war, the territory of the former Gau became part of the Russian SFSR exclave of Kaliningrad in the Soviet Union, major sections were given to Poland, and the area of the Klaipėda Region was returned to the Lithuanian SSR and Hrodna - to the Belarusian SSR within the Soviet Union.

== History ==
The Nazi Gau (plural Gaue) system was originally established in a party conference on 22 May 1926, in order to improve administration of the party structure. From 1933 onward, after the Nazi seizure of power, the Gaue increasingly replaced the German states as administrative subdivisions in Germany.

At the head of each Gau stood a Gauleiter, a position which became increasingly more powerful, especially after the outbreak of the Second World War, with little interference from above. Local Gauleiters often held government positions as well as party ones and were in charge of, among other things, propaganda and surveillance and, from September 1944 onward, the Volkssturm and the defense of the Gau.

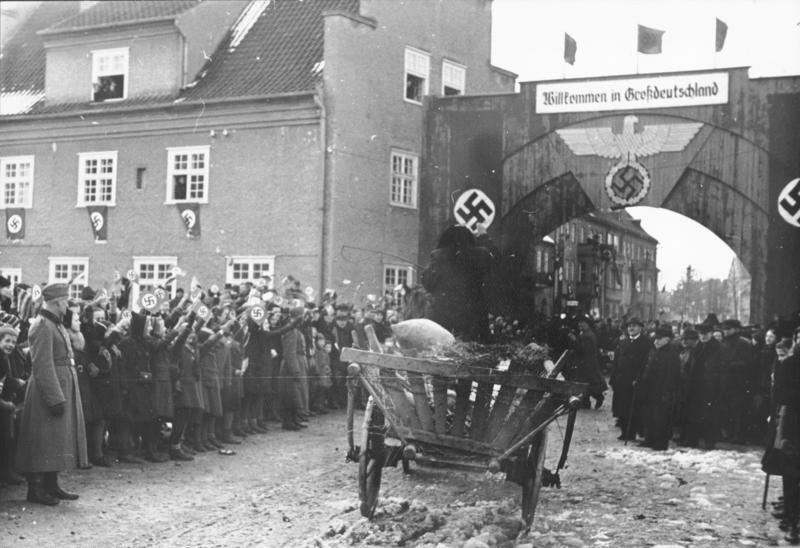
Eydtkau (now Chernyshevskoye) in 1941

The position of Gauleiter in East Prussia was held by Wilhelm Stich from 1925 to 1926, Bruno Gustav Scherwitz from 1926 to 1927, Hans Albert Hohnfeldt (acting) from 1927 to 1928 and Erich Koch from 1 October 1928 to the end of the Nazi regime.

In the annexed pre-war Polish territory, the Polish population was subjected to various crimes, including mass arrests, roundups, deportations to forced labour and concentration camps (including teenagers), executions, massacres (also as part of the Intelligenzaktion and Aktion T4) and expulsions.

Germany operated the Soldau and Hohenbruch concentration camps, mostly for Poles, multiple subcamps of the Stutthof concentration camp and several prisoner-of-war camps, including Stalag I-A, Stalag I-B, Stalag I-C, Stalag I-D, Stalag I-E, Stalag I-F, Stalag Luft VI, Oflag 52, Oflag 53, Oflag 60, Oflag 63 and Oflag 68 with multiple subcamps, for Polish, Belgian, French, British, Serbian, Soviet, Italian, American, Canadian, Australian, New Zealander, South African, Czech and other Allied POWs in the province. Pre-war Polish citizens made up the majority of forced laborers in the province, with their numbers gradually increasing, but due to the influx of forced laborers of other nationalities, their overall percentage declined from 90% in 1940 to 62% in 1944. Most Polish forced laborers in the province were deported from the pre-war Polish territories annexed into the province by Germany, with German labor offices recruiting forced laborers established in the cities of Ciechanów, Ostrołęka, Płock and Suwałki.

Hitler's top-secret Eastern front headquarters during the war, the Wolf's Lair, was located in the village of Gierłoż.

The Polish resistance was active in the province, both in the annexed pre-war territory of Poland, and in the pre-war territory of East Prussia, with activities in the latter including distribution of Polish underground press, sabotage actions, executions of Nazis, theft of German weapons, ammunition and equipment, and organization of transports of POWs who escaped German POW camps via the ports of Gdańsk and Gdynia to neutral Sweden.

== See also ==
- Gauliga Ostpreußen, the highest association football league in the Gauliga from 1933 to 1945
