= Günther Vollmer =

Nazi jurist

- Born: 20 April 1902; Kreuzau, Rhine Province, German Empire
- Died: 20 April 1945 (aged 43); Frankenberg, Province of Saxony, Nazi Germany
- Occupations: Jurist, Attorney general of the Oberlandesgericht Königsberg
- Years active: 1926–1945

Günther Vollmer (20 April 1902 – 20 April 1945) was a member of the Nazi Party and a German jurist and doctor of law (Dr. iur.). He was the attorney for Erich Koch, one of the leaders of the Nazi Party in East Prussia. During the Third Reich, he worked for the Reich Ministry of Justice in several different positions as an attorney and legal advisor. He was also Gauführer of the professional organization of Nazi jurists.

== Biography ==
Vollmer wrote his doctoral dissertation in 1926 on "The Development and Contemporary Meaning of Hostageship: a Study in International Law" at the University of Cologne. He first joined the Nazi Party in 1922 and again in March 1932, after it was reorganized. Vollmer was an attorney in Königsberg, where he was named senior state attorney by the Königsberg Landgericht in June 1933. While there, he worked under Roland Freisler on a position paper on criminal law called "National Socialist Guidelines for a new German Criminal Code" (Nationalsozialistische Leitsätze für ein neues deutsches Strafrecht). Released by the Prussian Ministry of Justice in 1933, the document interpreted the law more narrowly, curtailing previous rights.

Because of his trustworthiness and loyalty to the Nazi Party, Vollmer was already Gauführer of the Association of National Socialist German Jurists (Bund Nationalsozialistischer Deutscher Juristen) and was Gaurechtsamtsleiter of the National Socialist German Workers' Party. His new position, however, brought him into conflict with the Oberlandesgericht district president, and the Ministry of Justice, with the approval of Hermann Göring, transferred him to the public prosecutor's office in Stendal in 1934. In February 1935, he became an aide in the Reich Ministry of Justice, where he worked as an advisor on legal questions. In October 1935, he took a position in the public prosecutor's office of the Kammergericht. Erich Koch wanted Vollmer back in East Prussia and had already tried to get him returned to Königsberg. In summer 1937, Koch won Göring's approval to have Vollmer returned to Königsberg and the Reich Ministry of Justice named Vollmer general state attorney (Generalstaatsanwalt) in Königsberg on December 1, 1937. He began work on January 5, 1938. He later became a Ministerial Director. Koch was of the opinion that Vollmer (and others) were beholden to him for their careers and should therefore be obedient to him.

Summarizing the kind of behavior that justified the death penalty according to 1943-1944 jurisprudence, Dr. Vollmer wrote, "No longer tolerable and fundamentally worthy of death are [...] remarks of the following kind: The war is lost; Germany or the Führer picked a fight and senselessly or frivolously started the war and must lose it; the NSDAP should or will relinquish power and, like the Italian model, make way for the understanding of peace; a military dictatorship must be established and will be able to forge peace, one must work slowly in order to bring about the conclusion; an intrusion of bolshevism would not be as bad as the propaganda paints it, and will only harm the leading National Socialists; the English or the Americans will stop bolshevism at the German border; urging by word of mouth or letters to the front to throw down their guns or turn back; the Führer is sick, incompetent, a butcher, etc." (Note: The original German reads, "Nicht mehr tragbar und grundsätzlich todeswürdig sind (...) Äußerungen folgender Art: Der Krieg sei verloren; Deutschland oder der Führer hätten den Krieg sinnlos oder frivol vom Zaune gebrochen und müßten ihn verlieren; die NSDAP solle oder werde abtreten und nach italienischem Muster den Weg zum Verständnisfrieden frei machen; eine Militärdiktatur müsse errichtet werden und werde Frieden schließen können, man müsse langsamer arbeiten, damit Schluß werde; ein Eindringen des Bolschewismus sei nicht so schlimm, wie es die Propaganda schildere, und werde nur den führenden Nationalsozialisten schaden; Engländer oder Amerikaner würden den Bolschewismus an der deutschen Grenze zum Stehen bringen; Mundpropaganda und Feldpostbriefe mit der Aufforderung, die Gewehre wegzuwerfen oder umzudrehen; der Führer sei krank, unfähig, ein Menschenschlachter usw.")

On November 18, 1944, Vollmer gave a lecture in Göttingen to the National Socialist Lawyers' Association with Rudolf Smend (January 15, 1882 – July 5, 1975), a jurist and law professor. Their topic was wartime criminal law and its maintenance. A letter sent to Vollmer by another Ministerial Director was used in the Nuremberg Trials to show that judges were not just guided by the executive branch, but were also spied on by Adolf Hitler's government. He was killed on 20 April 1945, his birthday (incidentally also Hitler's), shortly before the end of the Second World War, in Frankenberg, Saxony.

== Publications ==
- Entwicklung und heutige Bedeutung der Geiselschaft: eine völkerrechtliche Studie (1926); Ohlau in Schlesien (1928)
- Reichs-Rechtsanwaltsordnung: in der Fassung des Gesetzes vom 21. Februar 1936 Berlin (1936)
- Reichsnotarordnung vom 13. Februar 1937 : mit einschlaegigen Nebengesetzen u. Verwaltungsbestimmungen Berlin (1937)
