= Ludwik Zabrocki =

Polish linguist

Ludwik Zabrocki (24 November 1907 in Czersk, German Empire – 8 October 1977 in Poznań) was a Polish linguist, an expert in German and Indo-European studies.

He was a professor at the Adam Mickiewicz University in Poznań (from 1953), a member of the Polish Academy of Sciences (since 1971). He was the editor-in-chief of the following journals: Lingua Posnaniensis, Biuletyn Fonograficzny, Glottodydactica.

His notable works include:

- Gwara Borów Tucholskich (1934)
- Wspólnoty komunikatywne w genezie i rozwoju języka niemieckiego (1963)
- U podstaw struktury i rozwoju języka (1980), published posthumously
