= Hans Albert Hohnfeldt =

German Nazi Party official (1897–1948)

Gauleiter of the Free City of Danzig
- In office 11 March 1926 – 20 June 1928
- Appointed by: Adolf Hitler
- Preceded by: Position established
- Succeeded by: Walter Maass

Acting Gauleiter of Gau East Prussia
- In office 17 March 1927 – 20 August 1928
- Appointed by: Adolf Hitler
- Preceded by: Bruno Gustav Scherwitz
- Succeeded by: Erich Koch

Senator for Social Welfare Free City of Danzig
- In office 1937 – 2 September 1939
- Succeeded by: Position abolished

Personal details
- Born: 22 May 1897 Neufahrwasser, Danzig, German Empire
- Died: 1948 (aged 50–51) Unknown
- Party: Nazi Party
- Other political affiliations: German Social Party
- Education: University of Berlin
- Profession: Civil servant

Military service
- Allegiance: German Empire
- Branch/service: Royal Prussian Army
- Years of service: 1915–1918
- Rank: Vizefeldwebel
- Unit: West Prussian Foot Artillery Regiment 17
- Battles/wars: World War I
- Awards: Iron Cross, second class

Hans Albert Hohnfeldt (22 May 1897 – 31 July 1948) was a member of the Nazi Party (NSDAP) who served as Gauleiter in the Free City of Danzig and acting Gauleiter of Gau East Prussia. He also held other Party and government posts in the Free City of Danzig until September 1939 when the city was annexed by Nazi Germany. Details of his subsequent life are not known.

== Early life ==
Born in Neufahrwasser, Danzig (today, Nowy Port, Gdańsk), Hohnfeldt attended high school there and in Neustadt (today, Wejherowo) then in West Prussia. He graduated in 1915 and became a one-year volunteer in the Royal Prussian Army. He served during World War I in the West Prussian Foot Artillery Regiment 17, and was discharged in 1918 with the rank of Vizefeldwebel of reserves, having earned the Iron Cross, second class. Around 1919–1920, he served in the Freikorps with the Marinebrigade Ehrhardt. From 1919 to 1921, he studied law and economics at the University of Berlin. In November 1922, he entered the civil service of the Free City of Danzig as a tax administration officer.

In 1923, Hohnfeldt joined the Nazi Party but it was banned in the aftermath of the November 1923 Beer Hall Putsch. He then became the first Danzig branch chairman of the antisemitic and Völkisch German Social Party and, in January 1924, was elected as a member of the Danzig Volkstag (parliament).

== Nazi Party career ==
After the ban on the Nazi Party was lifted, Hohnfeldt rejoined it on 8 October 1925 and founded the Ortsgruppe (local group) Danzig, becoming its first Ortsgruppenleiter. On 11 March 1926, he was appointed Gauleiter of the Free City of Danzig, the first holder of this position. Wilhelm von Wnuck served as his deputy. On 17 March 1927, after the resignation of Bruno Gustav Scherwitz as Gauleiter of East Prussia, Hohnfeldt was named acting Gauleiter for that neighboring region as well. In September 1927, he also became SA-Gauführer East, commanding all Sturmabteilung (SA) paramilitary units in East Prussia, West Prussia and Danzig. Simultaneously, he joined the Schutzstaffel (SS) with the rank of SS-Standartenführer and was named Gau SS-Führer for Danzig.

However, on 20 June 1928, Hohnfeldt abruptly resigned as Gauleiter and Gau SS-Führer in Danzig, and also as SA-Gauführer East, ostensibly due to illness. In reality, this was one of a number of changes that Adolf Hitler made in the Gauleiter ranks, replacing those he felt were too socialist in outlook, or whom he considered lacked the necessary attributes to be effective administrators. Hohnfeldt was succeeded in an acting capacity by Walter Maass, the newly appointed Deputy Gauleiter. Hohnfeldt briefly continued in his role as acting Gauleiter in East Prussia until 20 August 1928, when he was removed from that post as well. After a brief interregnum, he was succeeded by Erich Koch on 1 October.

In July 1931, Hohnfeldt became a specialist for civil service issues in the Danzig Gau organization and, in September, he was promoted to head of the Civil Service Department there. In April 1933, he became the first chairman of the Danzig Civil Servants' League (Danziger Beamtenbund). Again elected to the Danzig Volkstag in May 1933, he would continue to serve there until it was dissolved in September 1939. He next became the leader of the NSDAP parliamentary group on 20 June 1933, and also was elected to the Senate of the Free City of Danzig. After the Reich League for Civil Servants (Reichsbund der Deutschen Beamten) was founded in October 1933, he became its regional head for Danzig. In July 1934, he was assigned to the central Party leadership (Reichsleitung) of the NSDAP in the Brown House in Munich. There, on 1 September 1934, he became the head of the Propaganda and Organization Department in the Main Office for Civil Servants (Hauptamt für Beamte). He also served as the director of the Danzig Civil Servants' Association (Danziger Beamten-Verband) but he was given a leave of absence in March 1936 and discharged on 30 June 1936.

Leaving the Munich Reichsleitung post in 1937, Hohnfeldt returned to Danzig as Senator for Social Welfare in the city's administration. He served until 2 September 1939 when the Free City of Danzig ceased to exist and was incorporated into the German Reich. Further details of his life are unknown. He died in 1948.

== Sources ==
- Höffkes, Karl (1986). Hitlers Politische Generale. Die Gauleiter des Dritten Reiches: ein biographisches Nachschlagewerk. Tübingen: Grabert-Verlag. ISBN 3-87847-163-7.
- Miller, Michael D.; Schulz, Andreas (2012). Gauleiter: The Regional Leaders of the Nazi Party and Their Deputies, 1925–1945. Vol. I (Herbert Albrecht - H. Wilhelm Hüttmann). R. James Bender Publishing. ISBN 978-1-932970-21-0.
- Orlow, Dietrich (1969). The History of the Nazi Party: 1919–1933. University of Pittsburgh Press. ISBN 0-8229-3183-4.
