= Coat of arms of Czersk =

- Armiger: Czersk
- Adopted: 30 June 1999 (current version); 28 March 1925 (first version)
- Shield: Iberian style escutcheon

The current design of the coat of arms, one of the symbols of the town of Czersk, Poland, and the municipality of Czersk, had been established in 1999. The original coat of arms had been created in 1925.

== Design ==
The current coat of arms of Czersk consists of an Iberian style escutcheon (shield) with square top and rounded base, with the aspect ratio of its height to its width equal 7:6. The shield is divided horizontally into two fields, a white (silver) on the top, and blue on the bottom. On the white field are placed horizontally three spruce trees, while within the blue field are three small white (silver) wavy lines, stylized to look like waves on the water. In the centre of the coat of arms, on the boundary of two fields, is placed a black water wheel, and to its right, and its left, are black water dams.

== Flag ==
The flag of Czersk used since 1999.

The current flag of Czersk is divided into three horizontal stripes, blue, white and green, with the coat of arms placed in the centre of the white stripe. The middle white stripe is twice the size of the other stripe, and has the half of the height of the entire flag.

== History ==
The coat of arms of Czersk used from 1925 to 1999.

The coat of arms of Czersk had been established by the municipal council on 28 March 1925, as part of an attempt to be granted the town privileges, which happened in 1926. The coat of arms consisted of a blue Iberian style escutcheon (shield) with square top and rounded base. In the centre of the coat of arms was placed a black water wheel, and to its right, and its left, are black water dams. Above it were horizontally placed three spruce trees, while below it were placed three small white (silver) wavy lines, stylized to look like waves on the water. Alongside the coat of arms, the council also had established the town banner, which consisted of green, white, and blue stripes.

The flag of Czersk used from 1990 to 1999.

From 1990 to 1999, the town used a white flag with the coat of arms in the centre.

The current coat of arms and the flag of the town of Czersk, and the municipality of Czersk were established on 30 June 1999.

In 2008, the municipal council had established a controversial resolution, which altered who could use the coat of arms, making it required to get approval by the municipality. While on paper introduced as a measure to control the usage of the symbol in inappropriate manners, the resolution had been criticized, as the politicians used it to stop the political opposition from using the coat of arms. The change in law did not affect the flag design.
