= List of county flags of Pomeranian Voivodeship =

Counties (powiat) in Pomeranian Voivodeship, Poland have symbols in the form of flags.

Flag of the Pomeranian Voivodeship

According to the definition, a flag is a sheet of fabric of a specific shape, colour and meaning, attached to a spar or mast. It may also include the coat of arms or emblem of the administrative unit it represents. In Poland, territorial units (municipal, city, and county councils) may establish flags in accordance with the Act of 21 December 1978 on badges and uniforms. In its original version, the act only allowed territorial units to establish coats of arms. It was not until the "Act of 29 December 1998 amending certain acts in connection with the implementation of the state system reform" that the right for provinces, counties, and municipalities to establish a flag as the symbol of their territorial unit was officially confirmed. This change benefited powiats, which were reinstated in 1999.

Since 2013, all 16 counties and four cities with county rights have had their own flag in Pomerania. This symbol, since 2002, has been established by the voivodeship itself.

== List of valid county flags ==
=== City counties ===
Powiat	Flag	Description
City of Gdańsk		The city's flag was established by resolution No. XXXVIII/432/96 of 1 August 1996, although it had existed since 1457. It is a rectanglular flag with proportions of 5:8, red in colour with a gold crown and under it two isosceles silver crosses arranged in a column (as in the coat of arms design). The common axis of the crosses and the crown is situated at a distance of 1/3 of the length of the flag from the hoist.
City of Gdynia		The flag of the city is a rectangular flag with the proportions of sides 3:5, equal on both sides, with two horizontally arranged fields, white at the top and turquoise at the bottom, symbolising the sky and the sea. The white field features the coat of arms of Gdynia.
City of Słupsk		The city's flag was established by Resolution No. L/627/05 of 30 November 2005. It is a rectangular flag with proportions 5:8, white in colour, with red edge stripes of 0.22 values of the longer side. In the central part of the flag is the coat of arms of the city.
City of Sopot		The flag of the city was originally adopted in 1904, after changes in 1994. It is a rectangular flag with side proportions of 5:8, both sides identical, with two horizontally arranged fields, blue at the top and gold at the bottom. The proportions of the width of the blue field to the gold field are 1:1. In the centre of the flag field are placed the white seagull and the white fish from the city coat of arms.

=== Powiaty ===
Powiat	Flag	Description
Powiat bytowski		The county flag was established by Resolution No. XV/69/2000 of 30 March 2000. It is a rectangular flag with proportions of 5:8, divided into two equal vertical parts: yellow and blue. The symbols from the county coat of arms are placed on both sides of the flag.
Powiat chojnicki		The county flag was established by Resolution No. XVI/124/2000 of 19 June 2000. It is a rectangular flag with proportions of 5:8, divided into three horizontal stripes: gold, black and blue in the ratio 3:1:3.
Powiat człuchowski		The flag of the district was established by Resolution No. XII/66/2000 of 24 February 2000. It is a rectangular flag with proportions of 5:8, divided into three vertical stripes: two yellow and a red one in the ratio 1:3:1. In the central part of the flag is an emblem from the district's coat of arms.
Powiat gdański		The county flag was established by Resolution No. XXIV/119/2001 of 21 June 2001. It is a rectangular flag with proportions of 5:8, divided into two equal vertical stripes: white and red. In the central part of the flag is the county coat of arms.
Powiat kartuski		The county flag was established by Resolution No. XXXIII/284/2013 of 12 December 2013. It is a rectangular flag with proportions 5:8, blue in colour, in the central part of the flag the emblem from the county coat of arms is placed.
Powiat kościerski		The county flag was established by Resolution No. XIII/3/2000 of 1 March 2000. It is a rectangular flag with proportions of 5:8, divided into two equal vertical stripes: green and yellow. In the central part of the flag is the county coat of arms.
Powiat kwidzyński		The flag of the district was established by the resolution No. XXIX/198/2000 of 27 December 2000. It is a rectangular flag with proportions 3:5 red in colour, on the left side of which, between two golden beams, is placed the emblem from the district coat of arms.
Powiat lęborski		The county flag was established by Resolution No. XXIV/240/2002 of 15 March 2002. It is a rectangular flag with proportions of 5:8, divided into two equal horizontal stripes: blue and yellow. In the central part of the flag is the county coat of arms.
Powiat malborski		The county flag was established by Resolution No. XVIII/146/2000 of 28 April 2000. It is a rectangular flag with proportions of 5:8, divided into three vertical stripes: two red and one yellow in the ratio of 1:3:1. In the central part of the flag the county coat of arms is placed.
Powiat nowodworski		The county flag was established by Resolution No. XXX/150/2001 of 13 June 2001. It is a rectangular flag with proportions of 5:8, divided into two equal vertical stripes: white and green. On the left-hand side of the flag is the county coat of arms.
Powiat pucki		The county flag was established by Resolution No. XIX/100/2000 of 28 April 2000. It is a rectangular flag with proportions of 5:8 in blue with black and yellow stripes on both sides. In the central part of the flag is the emblem from the county coat of arms.
Powiat słupski		The county flag was established by Resolution No. XXI/135/2001 of 26 February 2001. It is a rectangular flag with proportions of 5:8, divided into three vertical stripes: two red one white in the ratio of 1:3:1. In the central part of the flag the county coat of arms is placed.
Powiat starogardzki		The flag of the district was established by the resolution No XXIV/148/2000 of 23 November 2000. It is a rectangular flag with proportions of 7:12 , golden in colour, in the central part of the flag is the emblem from the county coat of arms.
Powiat sztumski		The county flag was established by Resolution No. XII/54/2003 of 23 August 2003. It is a rectangular flag with proportions of 5:8, divided into three equal horizontal stripes: two red and one white. In the central part of the flag is the emblem from the county coat of arms.
Powiat tczewski		The county flag, designed by Stefan Kukowski, was established by Resolution No. IX/46/99 of 4 November 1999, again by Resolution No. XII/69/11 of 30 August 2011. It is a rectangular flag with proportions of 5:8, divided into two equal vertical parts: blue and white. It features the symbols from the county coat of arms.
Powiat wejherowski		The county flag was established by Resolution No. XVI/176/2000 of 25 August 2000. It is a rectangular flag with proportions of 5:8, divided into two equal vertical stripes: black and gold. To the left of the patch is the county coat of arms.

== See also ==
- Flags of municipalities in the Pomeranian Voivodeship
