= Dobrzyca, Koszalin County =

Dobrzyca
- Village
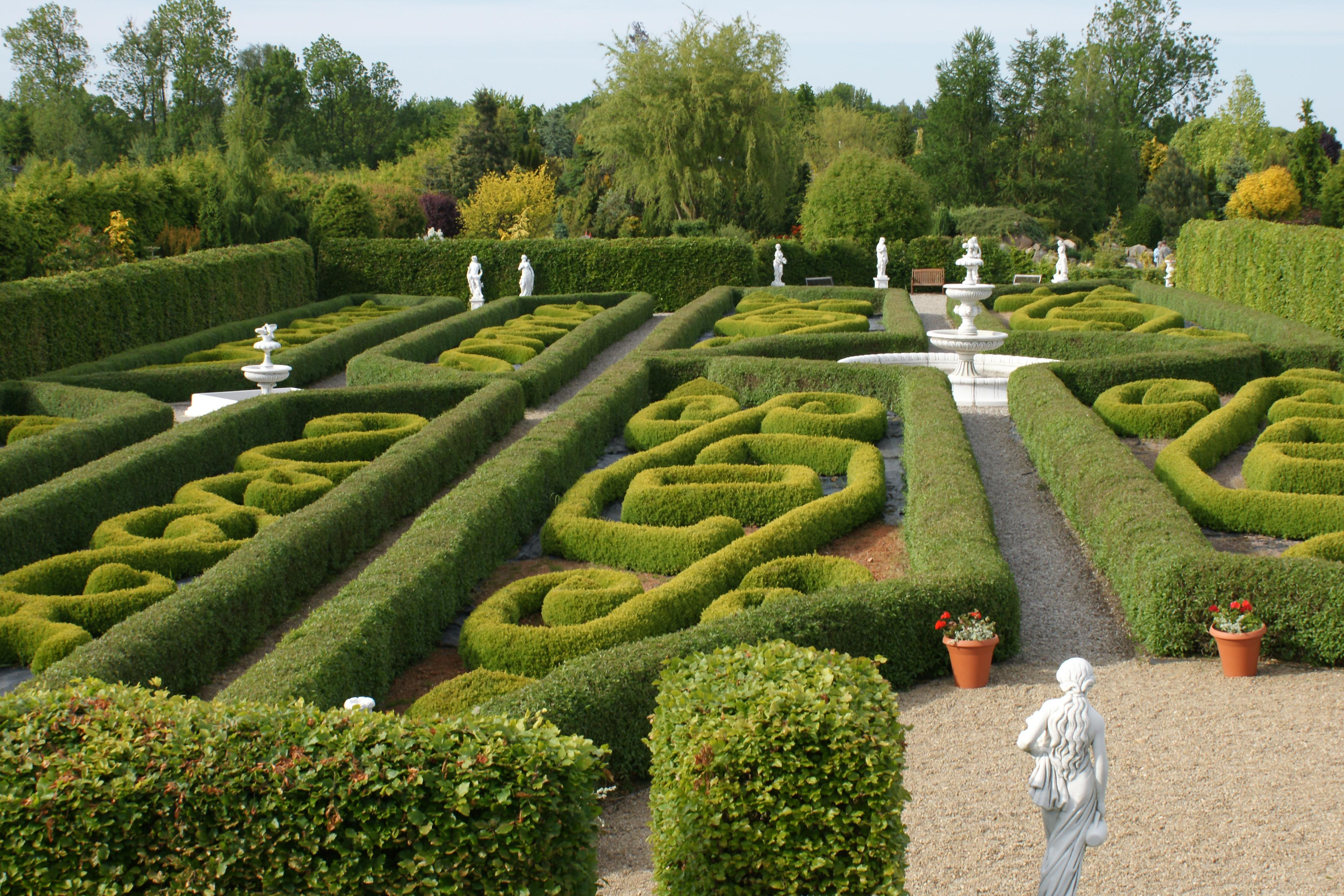
- Hortulus garden in Dobrzyca

- Location within Poland
- Coordinates: 54°11′22″N 15°54′52″E
- Country: Poland
- Voivodeship: West Pomeranian
- County: Koszalin
- Gmina: Będzino
- Population (approx.): 800
- Time zone: UTC+1 (CET)
  - Summer (DST): UTC+2 (CEST)
- Vehicle registration: ZKO

Dobrzyca [dɔˈbʐɨt͡sa] (German: Kordeshagen) is a village in the administrative district of Gmina Będzino, within Koszalin County, West Pomeranian Voivodeship, in north-western Poland. It lies approximately 6 km (4 mi) south-west of Będzino, 18 km (11 mi) west of Koszalin, and 123 km (76 mi) north-east of the regional capital Szczecin. It is located in the historic region of Pomerania.

Notable sights include the Holy Trinity church and the Hortulus and Hortulus Spectabilis botanical gardens. The latter contains the world's largest hornbeam labyrinth.

The village has an approximate population of 800.
