= West Prussia (region) =

Government region of Prussia from 1920 to 1939

The West Prussia Region (German: Regierungsbezirk Westpreußen) was a government region (Regierungsbezirk) of Prussia from 1920 until 1939. The regional capital was Marienwerder in West Prussia (now Kwidzyn). It was the eastern part of Marienwerder Region which voted to be incorporated within the Weimar Republic and joined the Province of East Prussia from 1922 to 1939. It was replaced again by the reconstituted Marienwerder Region in 1939 until its dissolution in 1945.

== History ==
As a result of the Treaty of Versailles following World War I, most of West Prussia, including much of the Marienwerder Region, was allocated to the Second Polish Republic. Parts of the territory east of the river Vistula took part in the East Prussian plebiscite and remained in the Free State of Prussia within Weimar Germany. These parts of the Marienwerder Region were officially incorporated into the Province of East Prussia in 1922, and renamed from Marienwerder Region to Region of West Prussia. This smaller region consisted of the rural districts of Elbing-Land, Marienburg in West Prussia, Marienwerder, Rosenberg in West Prussia, Stuhm, and the city of Elbing (Elbląg); the districts of Elbing and Marienburg and the city of Elbing had previously been part of the Danzig Region. The districts of Deutsch-Krone, Flatow, and Schlochau became part of the new Prussian Frontier March of Posen-West Prussia. The districts of Graudenz, Konitz, Culm, Löbau, Schwetz, Strasburg in West Prussia, and Thorn became part of the Pomeranian Voivodeship of Poland.

On 26 October 1939, following the Wehrmacht's conquest of the Polish Corridor at the beginning of World War II, the Region of West Prussia was transferred from East Prussia to the newly created Reichsgau Danzig-West Prussia. It was also given back its original name of Marienwerder Region and included besides of German districts also occupational district authorities on Polish territory.

The region was dissolved in 1945 following Nazi Germany's defeat in the war. The Soviet conquerors handed the region's territory to Poland in March 1945. Since that time it has been part of Poland. At the Potsdam Conference, the three Allies assigned the region to Polish administration in August 1945, and the German-Polish Border Treaty confirmed the annexation in 1990.

== Districts in 1937 ==
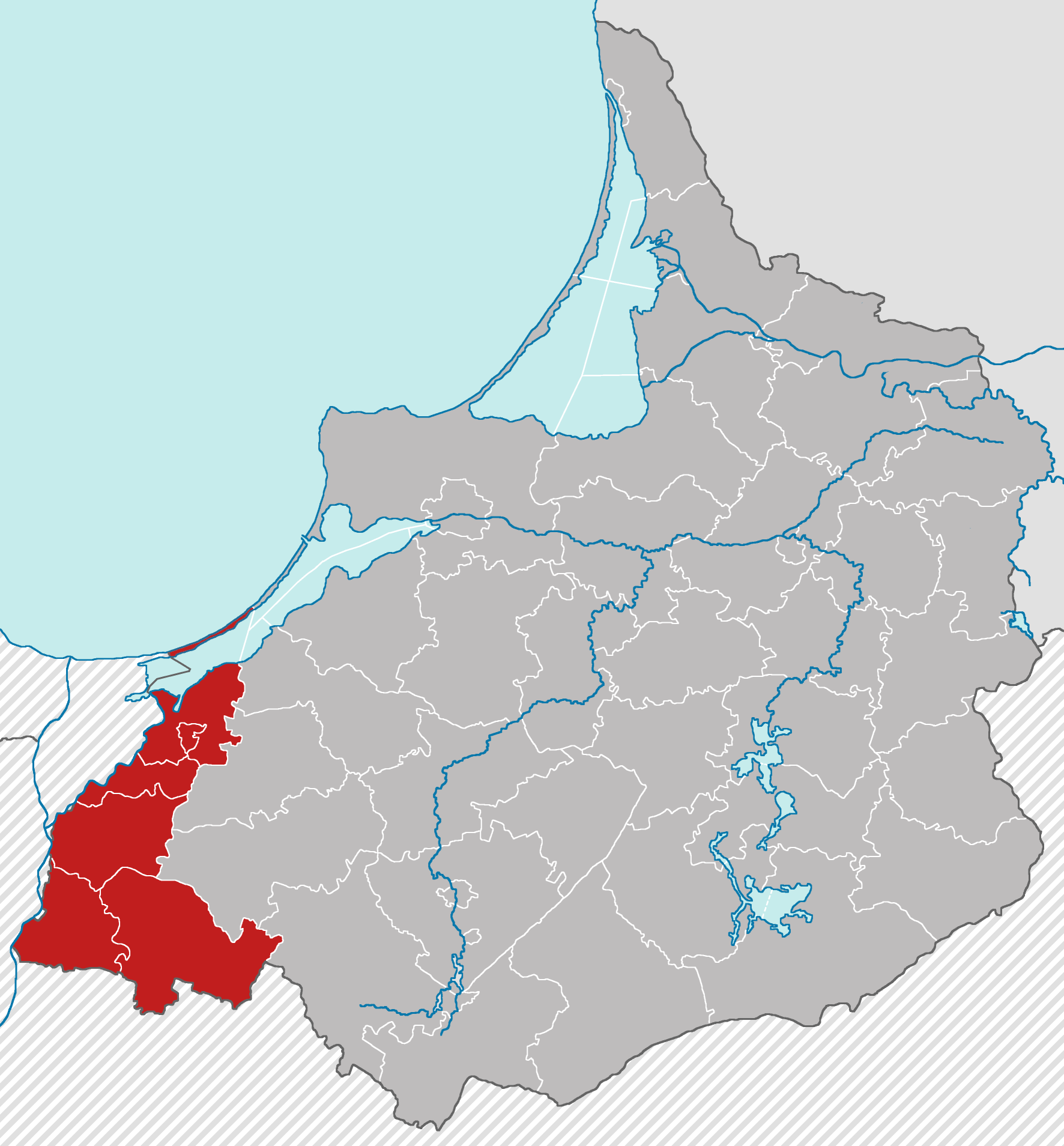
West Prussia, as the region was called from 1922 to 1939, then within the Province of East Prussia

Districts in the Region of West Prussia, based in Marienwerder, as of 31 December 1937

=== Urban districts ===
1. Elbing (1874-1945), disentangled from rural Elbing District

=== Rural districts ===
1. Elbing-Land (1818-1945), based in Elbing
2. Marienburg in West Prussia (1772-1945), based in Marienburg in West Prussia
3. Marienwerder (1752-1945), based in Marienwerder in West Prussia
4. Rosenberg in West Prussia (1818-1945), based in Rosenberg in West Prussia
5. Stuhm (1818-1945), based in Stuhm

== Regional presidents ==
Each of the Regierungsbezirke featured a non-legislative governing body called a Regierungspräsidium or Bezirksregierung (regional government) headed by a Regierungspräsident (regional president), concerned mostly with applying state law to administrative decisions on municipalities within their jurisdiction and their umbrella organisations (the districts).

- 1920–1922 : Theodor von Baudissin
- 1922–1923 : Alfons Proske
- 1923–1925 : Roland Brauweiler
- 1925–1936 : Karl Budding
- 1936–1939 : Otto von Keudell

== Literature ==
- (in German) Michael Rademacher: Deutsche Verwaltungsgeschichte Preußen, Provinz Westpreußen. (2006).
- (in German) E. Jacobson: Topographisch-statistisches Handbuch für den Regierungsbezirk Marienwerder, Danzig 1868 (Online, Google).
