= Czersk =

Town in Pomeranian Voivodeship, Poland

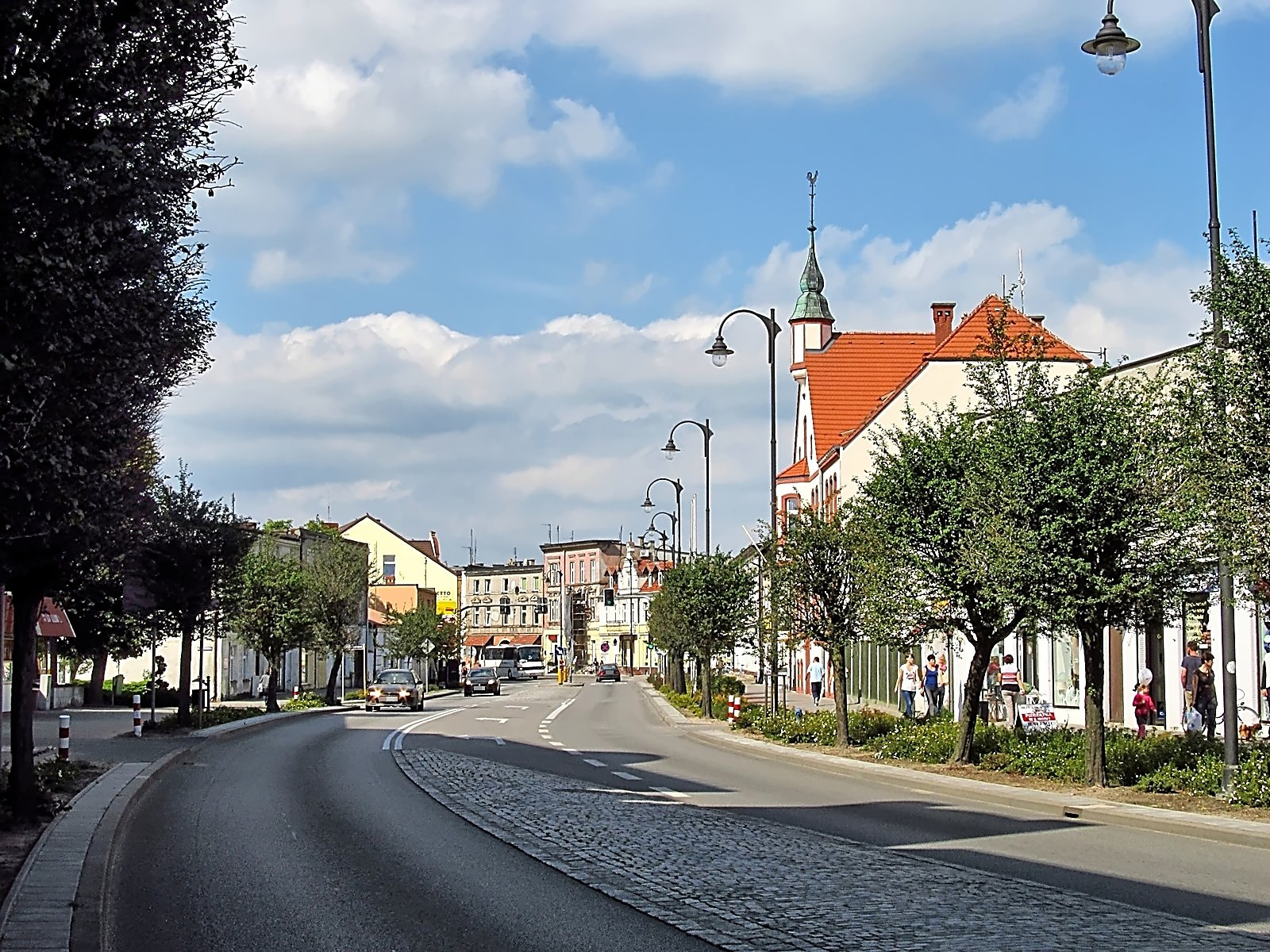
- Kościuszki Street in Czersk

- Flag Coat of arms

- Location within Poland
- Coordinates: 53°47′34″N 17°58′26″E
- Country: Poland
- Voivodeship: Pomeranian
- County: Chojnice
- Gmina: Czersk
- Established: 13th century
- Town rights: 1386-1772, 1926

Government
  - Mayor: Przemysław Biesek-Talewski

Area
  - Total: 9.73 km^{2} (3.76 sq mi)

Population (31 December 2021)
  - Total: 9,844
  - Density: 1,010/km^{2} (2,620/sq mi)
- Time zone: UTC+1 (CET)
  - Summer (DST): UTC+2 (CEST)
- Postal code: 89-650
- Area code: +48 52
- Vehicle registration: GCH
- Website: www.czersk.pl

Czersk (Polish: [t͡ʂɛrsk]; Kashubian: Czérskò; formerly German: Czersk, (1942-5): Heiderode) is a town in northern Poland in Chojnice County, Pomeranian Voivodeship. As of December 2021, the town has a population of 9,844.

== History ==
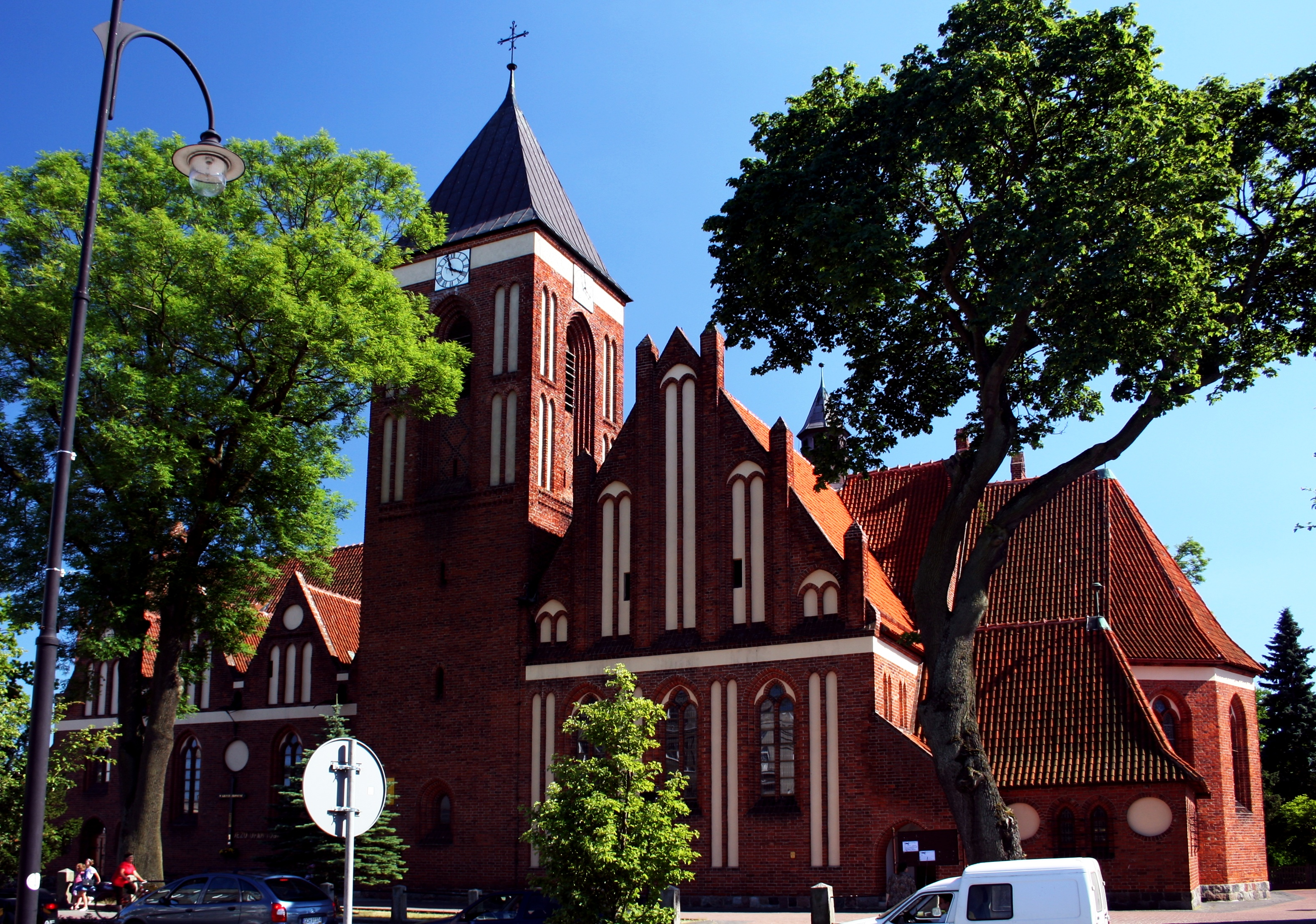
Saint Mary Magdalene Church

The territory became part of the emerging Polish state in the 10th century under its first historic ruler Mieszko I. In the 12th century, it was part of the Raciąż castellany. In the 13th century the local parish community was established, including the nearby villages of Rytel, Łąg, Mokre, Malachin. It was occupied by the Teutonic Knights since 1309. At that time Czersk was a village with a mill, inn, bitumic trade and bees farms. Czersk was mentioned in a document from 1330. In 1454, King Casimir IV Jagiellon reincorporated Czersk to the Kingdom of Poland, and then the Teutonic Knights renounced any claims in the peace treaty of 1466. 1584 marks the first and oldest known description of the Czersk church.

In the First Partition of Poland, in 1772, Czersk was annexed by Prussia. The population was subjected to Germanisation policies. In 1827, the first carriages are crossing Czersk via a carriage tract between Berlin and Königsberg. One of the main escape routes for insurgents of the unsuccessful Polish November Uprising from partitioned Poland to the Great Emigration led through the town. Second lieutenant and then budding poet Wincenty Pol, who led one of the columns, commemorated their stay in the town and the reception of the insurgents by local Poles with the poem "Nocleg w Czersku." In 1873, the railroad between Berlin and Königsberg was opened, passing through Czersk; first major commercial economical development. In 1887, the history of furniture manufacturing in Czersk began, with the opening of the enterprise of Herman Shütta – presently Czersk Furniture Factory Klose. In 1906–1907, local children joined the children school strikes against Germanisation that spread throughout the Prussian Partition of Poland. In 1910–1913, the Gothic Revival Saint Mary Magdalene church was built.

Following World War I, Poland regained independence and the Greater Poland uprising against Germany broke out, so the local population secretly organized to liberate Czersk from the Germans. On January 6, 1919, the German Grenzschutz attacked Polish people walking to church, triggering a brawl in which the Poles battered their attackers. Faced with threats of German retaliation, the Poles took control of Czersk, after which a battle for the settlement was fought. After the clash, the Germans took control of Czersk and arrested prominent Poles, however, the Polish resistance continued its preparations to liberate Czersk. On January 29, 1920, Polish troops led by General Józef Haller entered Czersk, and it was reintegrated with Poland. On July 1, 1926, Czersk received its town rights.

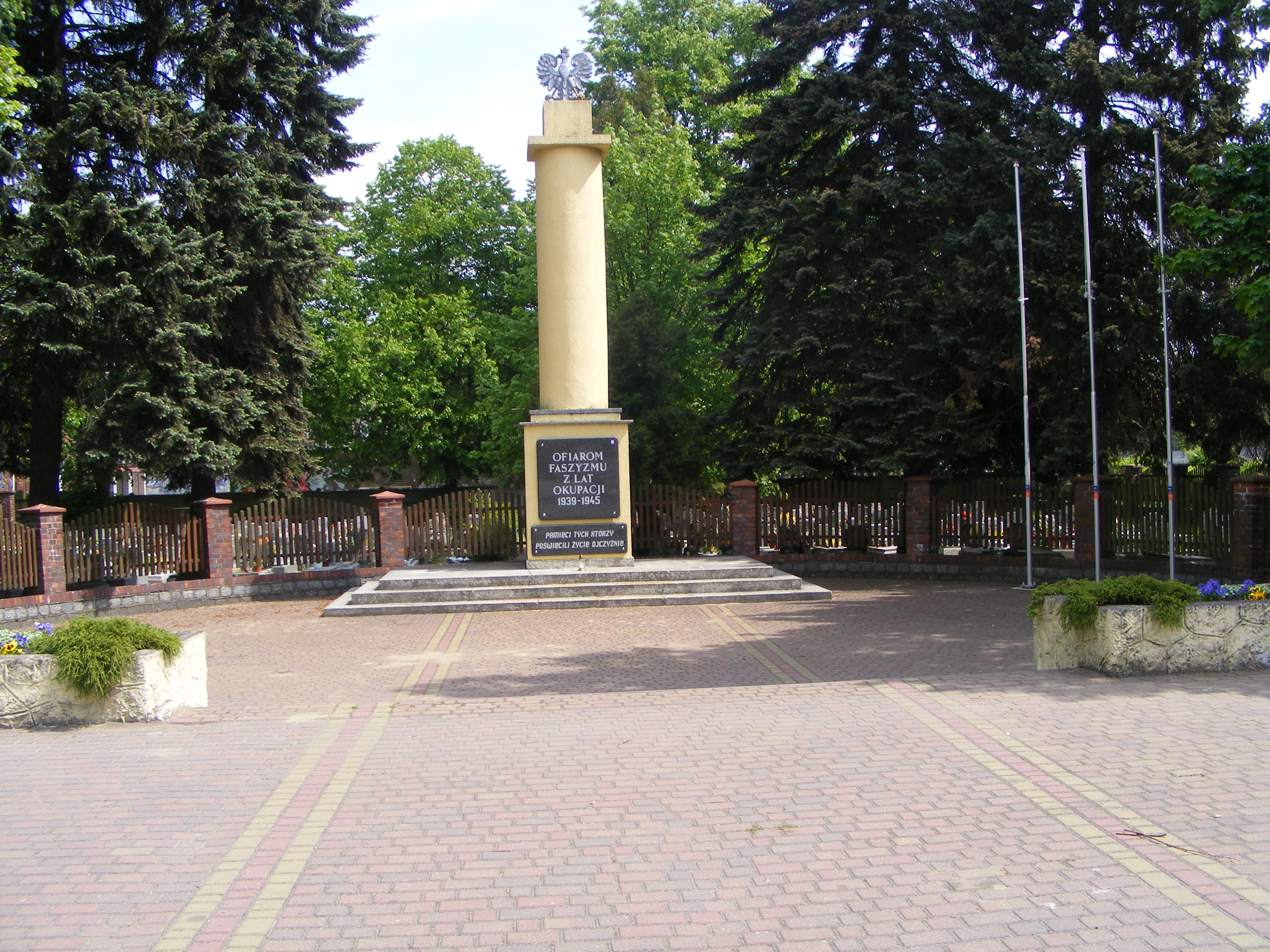
Monument to the victims of Nazi Germany in World War II

Czersk was invaded by Germany on September 3, 1939, the third day of World War II. During the subsequent German occupation, the Polish population of Czersk was subjected to various crimes and persecution. In 1939, dozens of Poles from Czersk, including the intelligentsia and political and administrative personnel, were arrested by the Germans and then massacred along with other Poles from the area in the Valley of Death near Chojnice and in nearby Łukowo. The Polish resistance movement was active and further executions of Poles, especially those aiding or participating in the resistance, were carried out in the following years. In 1942, the Germans renamed the town to Heiderode in attempt to erase traces of Polish origin. In 1940 and 1942, the occupiers carried out expulsions of Poles, who were deported either to the General Government in the more-eastern part of German-occupied Poland or to forced labour in Germany. Houses of expelled Poles were handed over to German colonists as part of the Lebensraum policy. On February 21, 1945, the Red Army captured Czersk. The Soviets carried out deportations to forced labor camps in the Ural Mountains and Soviet-occupied Latvia, where some 150 residents of the town and its environs died between 1945 and 1956. It was afterwards restored to Poland, although with a Soviet-installed communist regime, which stayed in power until the Fall of Communism in the 1980s. In the following years, the Polish anti-communist resistance was active in Czersk, including the local Iskra and Boś Group organizations, which engaged in sabotage actions.

Historical population
| Year | Pop. | ±% |
|---|---|---|
| 1921 | 6,700 | — |
| 1931 | 7,757 | +15.8% |
| 1939 | 8,500 | +9.6% |
| 1950 | 6,293 | −26.0% |
| 1960 | 7,235 | +15.0% |
| 2010 | 9,673 | +33.7% |

On May 27, 1990, the first post-war democratic elections were held with self-determination of Czersk community. Since 1990, modern infrastructure was systematically developed, including potable water system, sewer system and wastewater treatment plants (in Czersk and Rytel), heating gas distribution, development of a modern road system, railroad modernisation. In 1994–2002, a new center of commerce was built around J.Ostrowski Street. On January 19, 2001, a new sports indoor arena was completed, named after R. Bruski.

== Economy ==
The local industries include timber processing mills, brick factory, paper plant, weaving plant, furniture, metallurgy and factory of agricultural equipment, brewery, large trout farm, and food processing. The craft and commerce are flourishing.

== Transport ==
Czersk is located at the intersection of National road 22 and Voivodeship road 237, and there is a railway station in the town.

== Sports ==
The local football club is Borowiak Czersk. It competes in the lower leagues.

== Notable people ==
- Ludwik Zabrocki (1907 in Czersk – 1977) a Polish linguist, an expert in German and Indo-European studies.
