= Deutsche Volksliste =

Nazi program classifying inhabitants of German-occupied territory

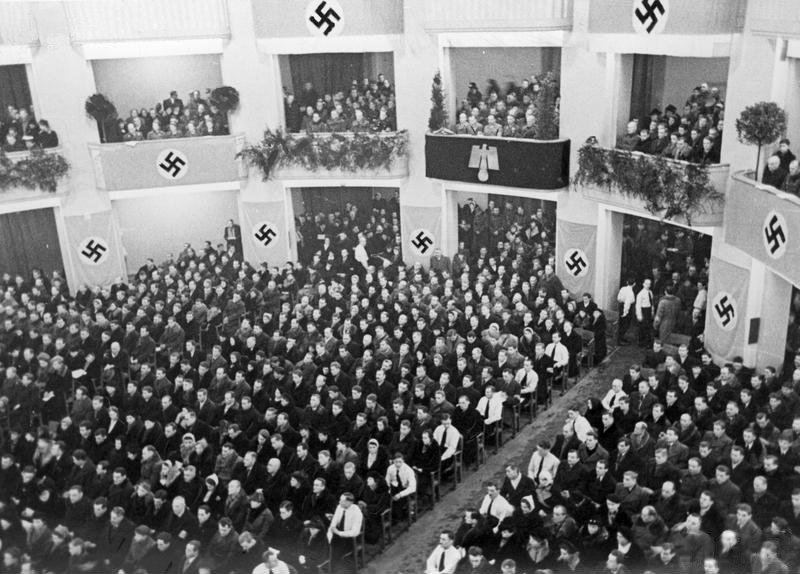
Volksdeutsche meeting in occupied Warsaw in 1940

The Deutsche Volksliste (DVL, German People's List) was a Nazi Party institution that aimed to classify inhabitants of Nazi-occupied territories (1939–1945) into categories of desirability according to criteria systematised by Reichsführer-SS Heinrich Himmler. The institution originated in occupied western Poland (occupied 1939–1945). Similar schemes were subsequently developed in occupied France (1940–1944) and in the Reichskommissariat Ukraine (1941–1944).

Volksdeutsche (ethnic Germans) topped the list as a category. They comprised people without German citizenship but of German ancestry living outside Germany (unlike German expatriates). Though Volksdeutsche did not hold German citizenship, the strengthening and development of ethnic German communities throughout east-central Europe formed an integral part of the Nazi vision for the creation of Greater Germany (Großdeutschland). In some areas, such as Romania, Croatia, and Yugoslavia/Serbia, ethnic Germans were legally recognised in legislation as privileged groups.

== Pre-war Nazi contact with ethnic Germans ==
In 1931, prior to its rise to power, the Nazi Party established the Auslandsorganisation der NSDAP (Foreign Organisation of the German National Socialist Workers Party), whose task was to disseminate Nazi propaganda among the German minorities living outside Germany. In 1936, the Volksdeutsche Mittelstelle (Ethnic German Welfare Office), commonly known as VoMi, was set up under the direction of Himmler as RKFDV of the German Schutzstaffel (SS) as the liaison bureau for ethnic Germans and was headed by SS-Obergruppenführer Werner Lorenz.

== Motivation for creating the list ==
=== Germanisation ===
According to the testimony of Kuno Wirsich:

The aim of the German People's List was that those people who were of German descent and of German ethnic descent were to be ascertained and were to be Germanised.

When Germany invaded Poland in 1939, it annexed the western part of the country (taking East Upper Silesia, creating the new entities of the Reichsgaue of Danzig-West Prussia and Wartheland, the Zichenau Region (or South East Prussia), and the General Government, the latter for the administration of the rest of its own occupied part of the country.

The plan for Poland, as set forth in Generalplan Ost, was to "purify" the newly annexed regions in order to create a Germanised buffer against Polish and Slavic influence. This entailed deporting Poles from these westernmost areas to those under General Government control, and settling the region with ethnic Germans from other places including from the General Government area, from within the pre-war German borders and from various areas that came under the control of Soviet Russia (Baltic States, eastern Polish territories, Volhynia, Galicia, Bukovina, Bessarabia and Dobrudscha).

To further its objective of Germanisation, Nazi Germany endeavoured to increase the number of 'Volksdeutsche' in the conquered territories by a policy of Germanising certain classes of the conquered people, mainly those among the Czechs, Poles, and Slovenes who had German ancestors. Thus, the Nazis encouraged the Polish offspring of Germans, or Poles who had family connections with Germans, to join the 'Volksliste', often applying pressure to compel registration. Those who joined enjoyed a privileged status and received special benefits. Registrants were given better food, apartments, farms, workshops, furniture, and clothing—much of it having been confiscated from Jews and Poles who were deported or sent to Nazi concentration camps.

Determining who was an ethnic German was not easy in regions that had Poles, ethnic Germans, and individuals of German ancestry who had been Polonised. There were many in western Poland who claimed German ancestry and resisted deportation to the General Government on the basis of it. Similar ambiguities occurred in all other eastern areas, such as Bohemia and Moravia, Slovakia, Hungary, Croatia, Romania, and Serbia. Even Himmler was impressed by this and said that such resistance must be evidence of their Nordic qualities. Furthermore, Nazi officials in charge of the various annexed territories from Poland did not want to see too many economically valuable local nationals sent eastwards, so they, too, desired some form of criteria that would allow them to avoid deporting any skilled Poles with German ancestry. Poles who were considered to be suitable for Germanisation were sent to the Reich as labourers. A "racial assessment" was also performed with regard to the ethnic German returnee with often disappointing results.

In 2006, German historian Götz Aly said the Nazi policy was based on French Republic selection criteria that were used after the First World War to expel ethnic Germans from Alsace.

=== Multiple ad hoc categorisation schemes ===
From the beginning of the German occupation of Poland, a number of categorisation schemes were developed at the local level, leading to confusion. For example, in October 1939, the governor of the Warthegau, Gauleiter Arthur Greiser, established a central bureau for the registration of Volksdeutsche, the Deutsche Volksliste (DVL: German Peoples List), also known as the Volksliste. At the beginning of 1940, distinctions were introduced to divide those registered in the DVL into four categories: ethnic Germans active on behalf of the Third Reich, "other" ethnic Germans, Poles of German extraction (Poles with some German ancestry), and Poles who were related to Germans by marriage.

=== Himmler's solution ===
Himmler's solution to the confusing and competing categorisation schemes was the Deutsche Volksliste (DVL), a uniform categorisation scheme that could be applied universally. The Racial Office of the Nazi Party had produced a registry called the Deutsche Volksliste in 1939, but this was only one of the precursors of Himmler's final version.

The Deutsche Volksliste consisted of four categories:

- Category I: Volksdeutsche (German > "Ethnically German") —Persons of German descent who had engaged themselves in favour of the Reich before 1939.
- Category II: Deutschstämmige (German > "of German Descent") — Persons of German descent who had remained passive.
- Category III: Eingedeutschte (German > "Voluntarily Germanised") — Indigenous persons considered by the Nazis as partly Polonised (mainly Silesians and Kashubs); refusal to join this list often led to deportation to a concentration camp.
- Category IV: Rückgedeutschte (German > "Forcibly Germanised") — Persons of Polish nationality considered "racially valuable", but who resisted Germanisation.

Those members of the population rated in the highest category were tapped for citizenship and concomitant compulsory military service in the German Armed Forces. At first, only Category I were considered for membership in the SS (Schutzstaffel). Similarly, women recruited for labour in Germany as nannies were required to be classified as Category I or II, because of their close contact with German children and the possibility of sexual exploitation, and so of children; Himmler praised it as a chance to win back blood and benefit the women as well.

Himmler declared that no drop of "German blood" would be lost or left behind to mingle with an "alien race". "German blood" was regarded as so valuable that any "German" person would necessarily be of value to any country; therefore, all Germans not supporting the Reich were a danger to it. Persons who had been assigned to one of these categories but who denied their ties to Germany were dealt with very harshly and ordered to concentration camps. Men who had "a particularly bad political record"—had supported persecutions or boycotts of ethnic Germans—were to be sent to concentration camps immediately; their children were to be removed for Germanisation, and their wives either sent to the camps as well, if they had also supported the actions, or removed for Germanisation.

Persons of categories III and IV were sent to Germany as labourers and subject to conscription into the Wehrmacht.

== Implementation in Poland ==
Himmler had the plan prepared and then ordered it to be administered by Wilhelm Frick's Interior Ministry. The Deutsche Volksliste was mandated in March 1941 by decrees of the Minister of the Interior of the Reich (Frick) and of Heinrich Himmler in his function as Kommissar für die Festigung des deutschen Volkstums (Commissioner for the strengthening of Germanhood). Thus, Himmler's plan was finally implemented a year and a half after the ad hoc categorisation processes had begun in Poland. On 3 April 1941 it was expanded to all western Polish areas (Reichsgau Danzig-West Prussia, East Upper Silesia, and the Zichenau Region.

=== East Upper Silesia ===
The nationality policy in East Upper Silesia was different from the one applied in other Polish areas included in the Reich. The motivation for the difference was the different local economic conditions and the necessity to keep qualified manpower essential to Silesian heavy industry. In some historical analyses, it has also been noticed, although less explicitly, that nationality policy of local German elites was also deliberately different. Apparently, Gauleiter Josef Wagner, as well as his successor, Fritz Bracht, saw the necessity to exclude Silesian people from qualification made only on the basis of race criteria which were emphasised by Heinrich Himmler when he was a Reich commissar for strengthening the Germanhood.

Fritz Bracht used also political criteria, which made the situation similar to Pomerelia (former West Prussia, annexed to Danzig-West Prussia) and areas annexed by Germany in Western Europe (such as Alsace-Lorraine). This resulted in a comparatively low number of deportations and in the majority of East Upper Silesians (both Silesian West-Slavs as well as ethnic Poles) being eligible for German citizenship, although their rights are alleged to have been limited compared to those of other German citizens.

=== Benefits of registration ===
The German occupation authorities encouraged Poles to register with the Volksliste, and in many instances even compelled them to do so. In occupied Poland, the status of Volksdeutscher conferred many privileges but also made one subject to conscription into the German military.

=== Polish response ===
Polish response to the institution of the Deutsche Volksliste was mixed. Being accepted into Class III could mean keeping one's property, but it might also mean being sent to the Reich as a labourer or being conscripted into the Wehrmacht.

Polish citizens of German ancestry, who often identified themselves with the Polish nation, were confronted with the dilemma of whether to sign the Volksliste. This group included ethnic Germans whose families had lived in Poland proper for centuries, and Germans (who became citizens of Poland after 1920) from the part of Germany that had been transferred to Poland after World War I. Many such ethnic Germans had married Poles and remained defiant. Often the choice was either to sign and be regarded as a traitor by the Poles, or not to sign and be treated by the German occupation as a traitor to the Germanic 'race'. Poles who registered as Germans were treated by other Poles with special contempt, and the fact of them having signed the Volksliste constituted high treason according to the Polish underground law. Poles who preferred to stay with their friends and relatives sometimes resisted Nazi pressures to apply for the DVL, opting for deportation to the General Government over Germanisation. Their children were often taken for Germanisation while they were deported.

In some parts of German-occupied Polish Silesia, the Volksliste was compulsory, and both the Polish government in-Exile and Bishop of Katowice, Stanisław Adamski, condoned signing it "to mask and save the Polish element in upper Silesia." Ethnic Poles from German-occupied Polish Silesia were also subject to pressure from Nazi authorities to sign category III or IV. In many cases people were imprisoned, tortured and their close ones threatened if they refused to sign; deportation to concentration camps was also common.

In some cases, individuals consulted with the Polish resistance first, before registering with the Volksliste. These Volksdeutsche played an important role in the intelligence activities of the Polish resistance and were at times the primary source of information for the Allies. However, in the eyes of the postwar Communist government, having aided the non-Communist Polish resistance was not considered a mitigating factor; therefore, many of these double-agent Volksdeutsche were prosecuted after the war.

=== Results ===
According to Robert Koehl, "By the introduction of the registration procedure known as the German National List (DVL) some 900,000 more 'Germans' were discovered, most of them semi-Polish minorities such as the Kassubians, the Masurians, and the local Upper Silesians whom the Germans called 'Wasserpolen'. A few thousand 're-Germanizeables' ...had also been shipped back to the Reich." By October 1943, around 90 percent (1,290,000) of Silesians signed the DVL.

The total number of registrants for the DVL is estimated to be approximately 2.7 million, with 1 million in classes I and II and the remaining 1.7 million in classes III and IV. In the General Government there were 120,000 Volksdeutsche. Deutsche Volksliste, late 1942

Annexed area	DVL (Total)	DVL 1	DVL 2	DVL 3	DVL 4
South East Prussia	45,000	8,500	21,500	13,500	1,500
Reichsgau Danzig-West Prussia	1,153,000	150,000	125,000	870,000	8,000
Warthegau	476,000	209,000	191,000	56,000	20,000
East Upper Silesia	1,450,000	120,000	250,000	1,020,000	60,000
Total	3,124,000	487,500	587,500	1,959,500	89,500

Annexed area	Deutsche Volksliste, early 1944			
Annexed area	Cat. I	Cat. II	Cat. III	Cat. IV
Warthegau	230,000	190,000	65,000	25,000
Reichsgau Danzig-West Prussia	115,000	95,000	725,000	2,000
East Upper Silesia	130,000	210,000	875,000	55,000
South East Prussia	9,000	22,000	13,000	1,000
Total	484,000	517,000	1,678,000	83,000
Total	2,762,000 million on Volksliste, plus 723,000 resettlers/Reichsdeutsche and a non-German population of 6,015,000			
Source: Wilhelm Deist, Bernhard R Kroener, Germany (Federal Republic). Militärgeschichtliches Forschungsamt, Germany and the Second World War, Oxford University Press, 2003, pp. 132,133, ISBN 0-19-820873-1, citing Broszat, Nationalsozialistische Polenpolitik, p. 134

== Implementation in other countries ==
After Germany occupied Yugoslavia, they partitioned it into various parts including Croatia and Serbia, where ethnic Germans became legalised members of the ruling nationality groups, and so they introduced the 'Volksliste' there. Registered ethnic Germans in Category 1 and 2 living in the Soviet Union were re-settled through Yugoslavia back to Germany.

== Postwar ==
At the end of the war, the files of the Deutsche Volksliste were generally found extant in the service registration departments of the respective local authorities. The bulk of these documents are today in Polish archives. In Poland, members of the Volksliste were subject to a "rehabilitation" process. As of 1950, 1,104,100 former German nationals and Volksliste members lived in Poland.

After the collapse of Nazi Germany, some Volksdeutsche were tried by the Polish authorities for high treason. Even now, in Poland, the word Volksdeutsch is regarded as an insult, synonymous with a traitor.

== See also ==
- Expulsion of Germans from Poland after World War II
- Flight and expulsion of Germans (1944–1950)
- History of Poland (1939–1945)
- Volksdeutsche
