= Polish areas annexed by Nazi Germany =

Territories of Poland annexed during WWII

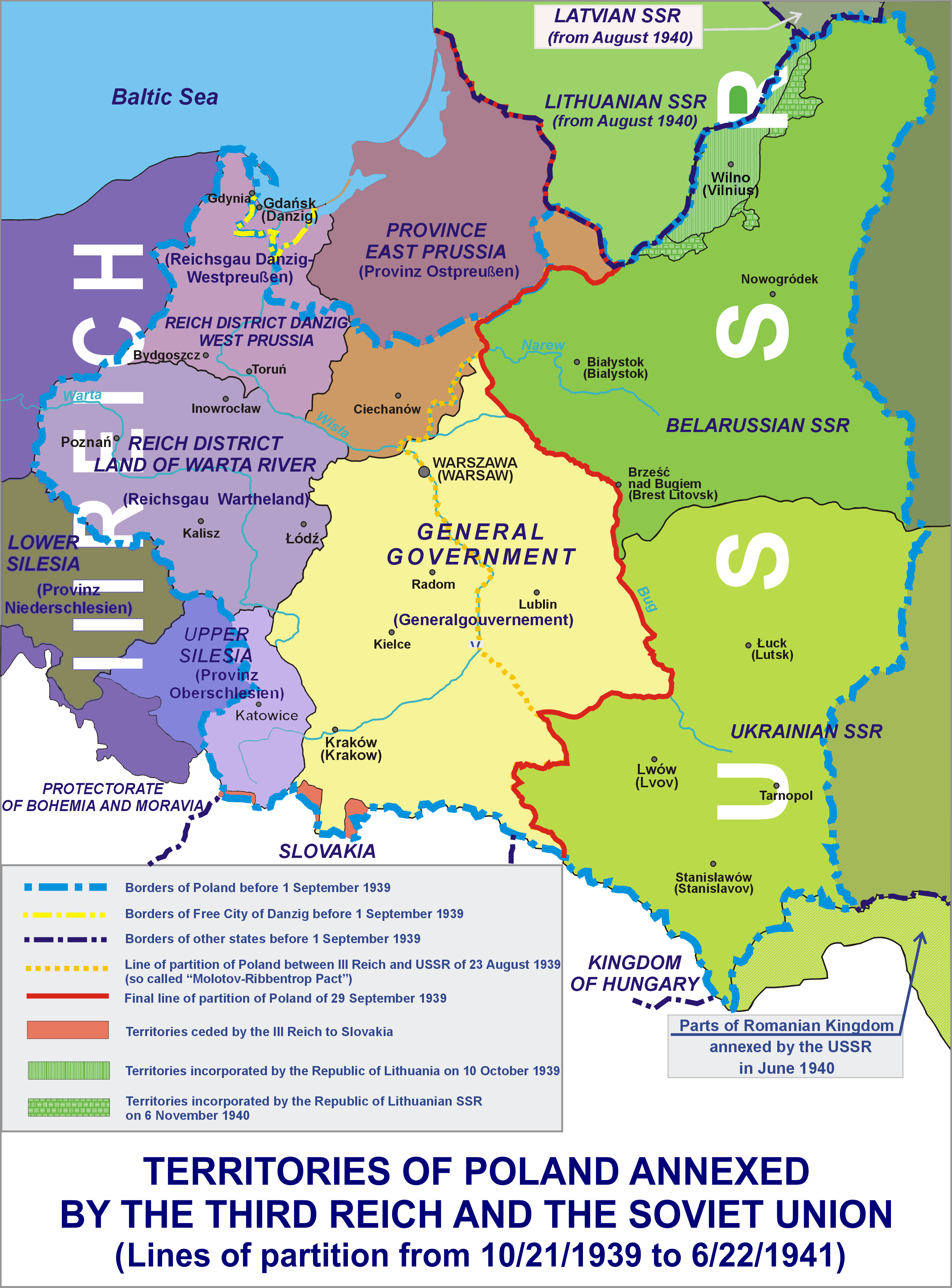
- In darker colours, Polish territories annexed by Nazi Germany and the Soviet Union with semi-colonial General Government in light yellow (centre)

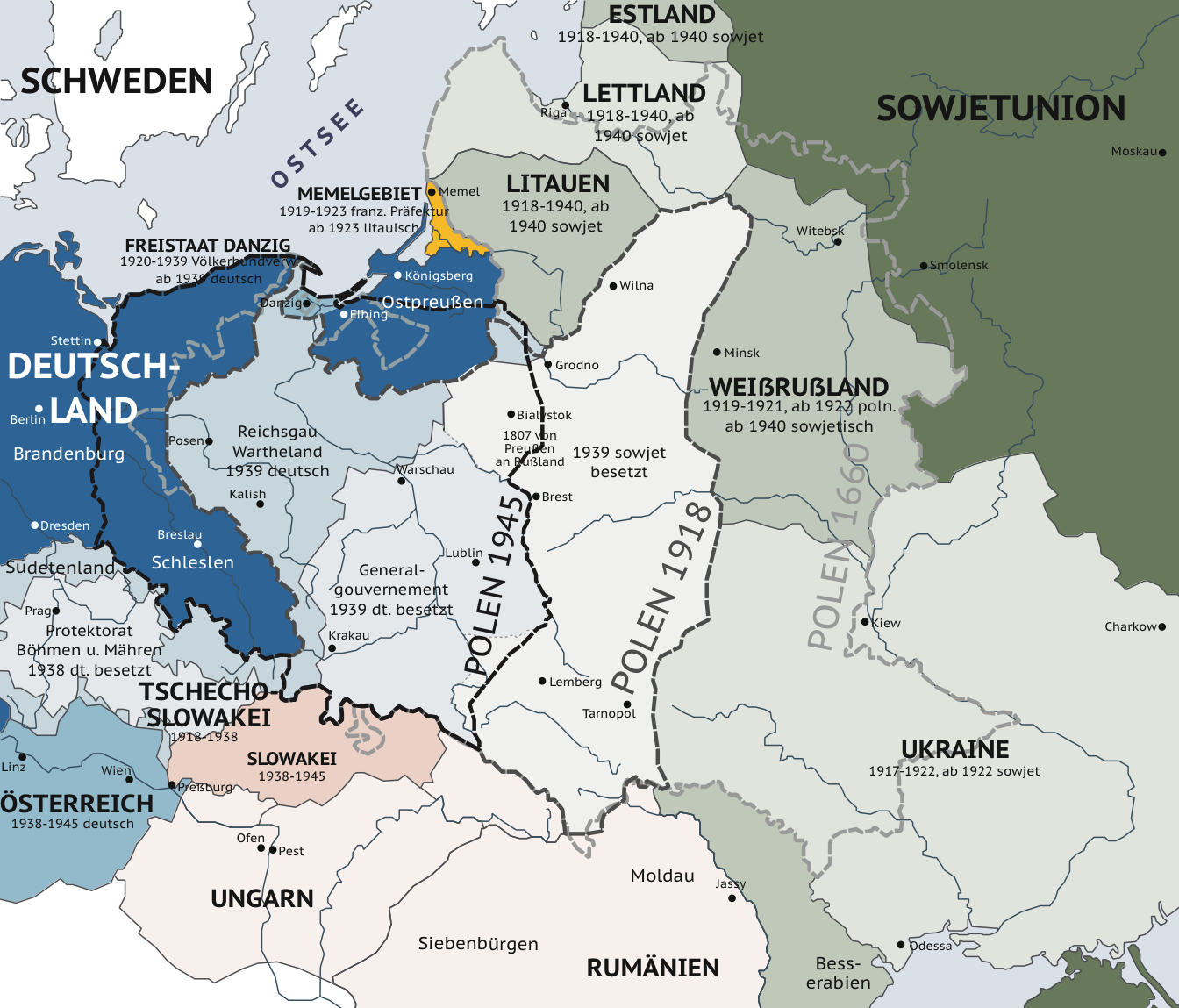
- Fourth Partition of Poland – The Nazi–Soviet Pact

Following the Invasion of Poland at the beginning of World War II, nearly a quarter of the entire territory of the Second Polish Republic was annexed by Nazi Germany and placed directly under the German civil administration. The rest of Nazi-occupied Poland was renamed as the General Government district. The annexation was part of the "fourth partition of Poland" by Nazi Germany and the Soviet Union, outlined months before the invasion, in the Molotov–Ribbentrop Pact.

Some smaller territories were incorporated directly into the existing Gaue East Prussia and Silesia, while the bulk of the land was used to create new Reichsgaue Danzig-West Prussia and Wartheland. Of those, Reichsgau Wartheland was the largest and the only one comprising solely the annexed territory.

The official term used by the Nazi authorities for these areas was the "incorporated Eastern territories" (German: Eingegliederte Ostgebiete). They planned for a complete Germanization of the annexed territories, considering them part of their lebensraum. The local Jewish population was forced to live in ghettos, and was gradually deported to concentration and extermination camps, the most infamous of which, Auschwitz, was located in annexed East Upper Silesia. The local Polish population was to be gradually enslaved, exterminated and eventually replaced by German settlers. The Polish elite especially became subject to mass murder, and an estimated 780,000 Poles were subject to expulsion, either to the General Government or to the Altreich for forced labour. The remaining Polish population was strictly segregated from the German population and subject to a variety of repressive measures. These included forced labour and their exclusion from all political and many cultural aspects of society. At the same time, the local German minority was granted several privileges, and their number was steadily raised by the settlement of ethnic Germans, including those displaced by the Nazi-Soviet population transfers.

After the Vistula–Oder Offensive in early 1945, the Soviet Union took control over the territories. The ethnic German population either fled the Red Army or were later expelled and the territories became part of the People's Republic of Poland.

== Background ==
Already in the fall of 1933 Adolf Hitler revealed to his closest associates his intentions to annex western Poland into an envisioned Greater Germany. In October 1939, a month after the invasion of Poland, Nazi Germany annexed an area of 92,500 square kilometres (35,700 sq mi) (23.7% of pre-war Poland) with a population of about 10,000,000 people (30% of the pre-war Polish population). The remainder of the Polish territory was either annexed by the Soviet Union (201,000 km^{2} or 51.6% of pre-war Poland as per the Molotov–Ribbentrop Pact) or made into the German-controlled General Government occupation zone (95,500 km^{2} or 24.5% of pre-war Poland). A tiny portion of pre-war Poland (700 km^{2}) was annexed by Slovakia.

Since 1935, Nazi Germany had been divided into provinces (Gaue) which had replaced the former German states and Prussian provinces. Of the territories annexed, some were attached to the already existing Gaue East Prussia and Silesia (later Upper Silesia), while from others new Reichsgaue Danzig-West Prussia and Wartheland were constituted. Wartheland was the only Gau constituted solely from annexed territory, Danzig-West Prussia comprised also former German areas and the former Free City of Danzig. The occupied General Government remained outside Nazi Germany.

The annexation violated international law (in particular, the Hague Convention IV 1907). Nazi Germany's officials discussed the convention and tried to circumvent it by declaring the war against Poland over prior to the annexation, which in their view made the convention non-applicable.

== Administration ==
Map of Nazi Germany showing its administrative subdivisions, the Gaue and Reichsgaue and annexed areas in 1944

On 8 and 13 September 1939, the German military district in the area of Posen, commanded by general Alfred von Vollard-Bockelberg, and West Prussia, commanded by general Walter Heitz, were established in conquered Greater Poland and Pomerelia, respectively. Based on laws of 21 May 1935 and 1 June 1938, the Wehrmacht delegated civil administrative powers to Chiefs of Civil Administration (CdZ). Hitler appointed Arthur Greiser to become the CdZ of the Posen military district, and Danzig's Gauleiter Albert Forster to become the CdZ of the West Prussian military district. On 3 October 1939, the military districts centered on and named "Lodz" and "Krakau" were set up under command of major generals Gerd von Rundstedt and Wilhelm List, and Hitler appointed Hans Frank and Arthur Seyß-Inquart as civil heads, respectively. Thus the entirety of occupied Poland was divided into four military districts (West Prussia, Posen, Lodz, and Krakau). Frank was at the same time appointed "supreme chief administrator" for all occupied territories.

=== Hitler's annexation decree, October 1939 ===
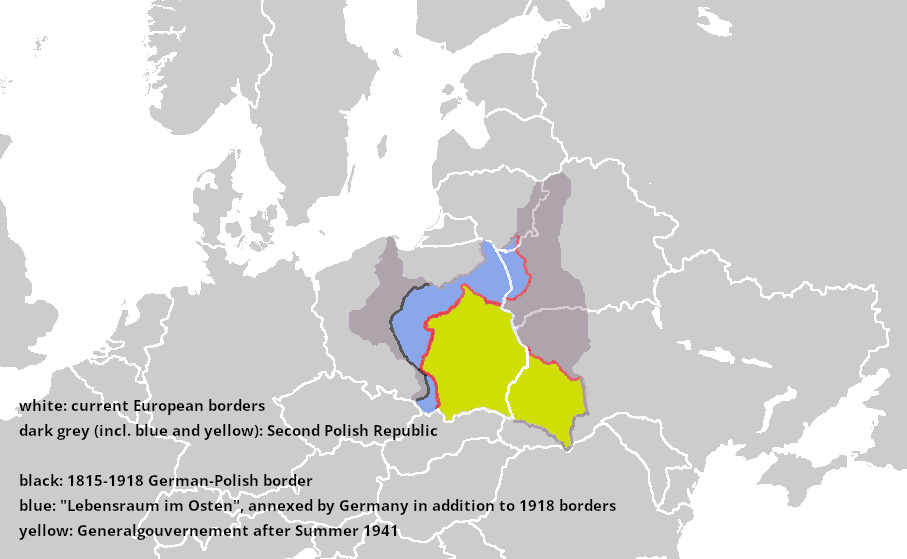
Map of Generalgouvernement (yellow) in comparison to Second Polish Republic (dark grey), today's borders (white), 1815-1918 German-Polish border (black), and areas annexed by Nazi Germany (blue)

After Hitler's peace offer was rejected by French prime minister Édouard Daladier on 7 October (and rejected by British prime minister Neville Chamberlain on 12 October) a decree was issued by Hitler on 8 October 1939, provided for the annexation of western Polish areas and the Free City of Danzig. A separate by-law stipulated the inclusion of the area around Suwalki (the Suwalki triangle).

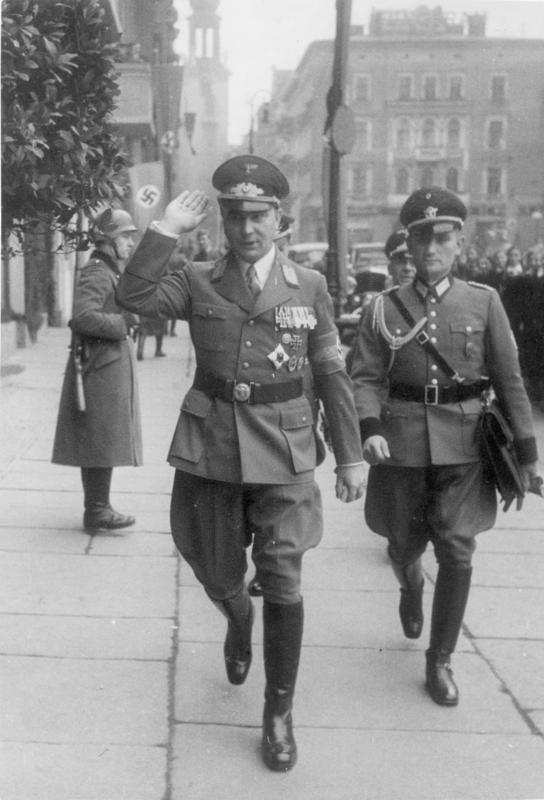
Arthur Greiser in German occupied Poznań, 2 October 1939

The first two paragraphs of the decree established "Reichsgau Posen" in Greater Poland with the government regions (Regierungsbezirk) Hohensalza, Posen, and Kalisch, as well as "Reichsgau West Prussia" (German: Westpreußen) in Pomerelia with the government regions Bromberg, Danzig, and Marienwerder. These government regions were named after the German language names of their chief cities: Hohensalza (Inowrocław), Posen (Poznań), Kalisch (Kalisz), Bromberg (Bydgoszcz), Danzig (Gdańsk), and Marienwerder (Kwidzyn). The annexed territories were twice as large as former Prussian conquests in the Partitions of Poland, also contained twice as many people. Compared to 1914, the border of Reich was extended eastwards by some 150–200 km on average. Despite this fact, Germany used old Prussian propaganda of creating a "German living wall" in Polish territories. On 29 January 1940, Reichsgau Posen was renamed "Reichsgau Wartheland" (Warthegau). Reichsgau West Prussia was renamed "Reichsgau Danzig-West Prussia".

The remaining annexed areas were not made separate provinces but included in the existing provinces of East Prussia and Upper Silesia per § 4 of Hitler's decree. Arthur Greiser was made Gauleiter of Reichsgau Posen, and Albert Forster of Reichsgau West Prussia.

== Following Operation Barbarossa of June 1941 ==
After the German attack on the Soviet Union in June 1941, the district of Białystok, which included the Białystok, Bielsk Podlaski, Grajewo, Łomża, Sokółka, Volkovysk, and Grodno Counties, was attached to (not incorporated into) East Prussia. Other Polish territories, first annexed by Soviet Union and then by Germany, were incorporated into Reichskommissariat Ostland (in the north), Reichskommissariat Ukraine (in the south) and the General Government (Distrikt Galizien in the utmost south).

=== Planned extension of annexation plans ===
The Nazi government intended to continue its incorporation of pre-war Polish territory into Germany. The rump General Government region of occupied Poland already under complete German civil control was merely seen as a transitional form of government, before the area's complete future integration into the Greater German Reich (Grossdeutsches Reich). The German bureaucrats subsequently discussed various proposals for the dismemberment of the remaining territories.

Hans Frank advocated for the transformation of some or all of his province into a "Vandalengau", in honor of the East Germanic Vandal tribes who in Ancient Times had dwelt in the Vistula river basin before the Barbarian migrations. In late 1939 a sixteen-man commission was also active to chart the boundaries of a projected Reichsgau Beskidenland (named after the Beskid mountain range), which would have encompassed the areas lying west of Kraków up to the San river to the east of it.

Nazi Party Secretary Martin Bormann on the other hand proposed that the General Government would in the near future be turned into 3–5 Reichsgaue or Reichsobergaue, including the Galician district. Leaving such discussions open for the conclusion of the war, Hitler never officially adopted or implemented any of these suggestions, instead retaining the status quo of using the areas as a labor reservoir.

=== Administrative divisions ===
New Nazi German administrative units		Old Polish administrative units	
Reichsgau/Gau (province)	Regierungsbezirk (government region)	Polish voivodeship/ (province)	Counties
Reichsgau Wartheland (Warthegau) initially Reichsgau Posen	Regierungsbezirk Posen; Reg.Bez. Hohensalza; Reg.Bez. Litzmannstadt ^{5}	Poznań Voiv.	all counties
Reichsgau Wartheland (Warthegau) initially Reichsgau Posen	Regierungsbezirk Posen; Reg.Bez. Hohensalza; Reg.Bez. Litzmannstadt ^{5}	Łódź Voiv.	most counties
Reichsgau Wartheland (Warthegau) initially Reichsgau Posen	Regierungsbezirk Posen; Reg.Bez. Hohensalza; Reg.Bez. Litzmannstadt ^{5}	Pomeranian Voiv.	five counties
Reichsgau Wartheland (Warthegau) initially Reichsgau Posen	Regierungsbezirk Posen; Reg.Bez. Hohensalza; Reg.Bez. Litzmannstadt ^{5}	Warsaw Voiv.	one county
Reichsgau Danzig-West Prussia ^{1} (Danzig-Westpreußen) initially Reichsgau West Prussia	Reg.Bez. Bromberg; Reg.Bez. Danzig ^{1} Reg.Bez. Marienwerder ^{1}	Greater Pomeranian Voiv.	most counties
Reichsgau Danzig-West Prussia ^{1} (Danzig-Westpreußen) initially Reichsgau West Prussia	Reg.Bez. Bromberg; Reg.Bez. Danzig ^{1} Reg.Bez. Marienwerder ^{1}	Free City of Danzig	
East Prussia ^{1} (Ostpreußen) southernmost part ^{2}	Reg.Bez. Zichenau; Reg.Bez. Gumbinnen ^{1}	Warsaw Voiv.	Ciechanów, Działdowo, Maków, Mława, Płock, Płońsk, Przasnysz, Sierpc; parts of Łomża, Ostrołęka, Pułtusk, Sochaczew, Warsaw
East Prussia ^{1} (Ostpreußen) southernmost part ^{2}	Reg.Bez. Zichenau; Reg.Bez. Gumbinnen ^{1}	Białystok Voiv.	Suwałki and part of Augustów
East Prussia ^{1} (Ostpreußen) southernmost part ^{2}	Bezirk Białystok (attached in 1941) ^{6}	Białystok Voiv.	Białystok, Bielsk Podlaski, Grajewo, Łomża, Sokółka, Volkovysk, Grodno
(Upper) Silesia ^{1;3} (Oberschlesien) easternmost part ^{4}	Regierungsbezirk Kattowitz; Reg.Bez. Oppeln ^{1}	Silesian Voiv.	
(Upper) Silesia ^{1;3} (Oberschlesien) easternmost part ^{4}	Regierungsbezirk Kattowitz; Reg.Bez. Oppeln ^{1}	Kielce Voiv.	Będzin, Olkusz, Sosnowiec, Zawiercie
(Upper) Silesia ^{1;3} (Oberschlesien) easternmost part ^{4}	Regierungsbezirk Kattowitz; Reg.Bez. Oppeln ^{1}	Kraków Voiv.	Chrzanów, Oświęcim, Żywiec
^{1} Gau or Regierungsbezirk only partially comprised annexed territory^{2} the annexed parts are also referred to as "South East Prussia" (German: Südostpreußen)^{3} Gau Upper Silesia was created in 1941, before it was part of Gau Silesia^{4} the annexed parts are also referred to as "East Upper Silesia" (German: Ostoberschlesien)^{5} named after the chief city, Polish: Łódź. This area was joined into the Warthegau on 9 November 1939; on 12 April 1940 Łódź's name was rendered Litzmannstadt, thus the Regierungsbezirk's name was changed accordingly.^{6} not incorporated into, but administered by Gau East Prussia, attached after the Nazi German invasion of the Soviet Union, 1941

== Demographics ==
Before the Nazi German invasion in September 1939 and the subsequent annexation in October, the territories held up to 10,568,000 people or some 30% of pre-1939 Poland's population. Due to flights, war losses, natural migration and the lack of contemporary reliable data, demographics especially in the border regions can only be estimated.

Area and population data in 1939 for Nazi German Gaue that included annexed territories of Poland ^{1}
Gau/Reichsgau	East Prussia		Reichsgau Danzig / West Prussia		Reichsgau Wartheland		Province of Silesia		Total of the four provinces		Only annexed parts of these provinces	
Area (km^{2})	52,099 km^{2}		25,705 km^{2}		40,309 km^{2}		46,908 km^{2}		165,021 km^{2}		86,295 km^{2}	
Total population	3,113,000		2,156,000		4,203,000		7,258,000		16,729,000		9,082,000	
Persons per km^{2}	61 per km^{2}		84 per km^{2}		104 per km^{2}		155 per km^{2}		101 per km^{2}		105 per km^{2}	
Ethnicity	Total	%	Total	%	Total	%	Total	%	Total	%	Total	%
Germans	2,004,768	71%	817,474	38%	309,002	7%	3,813,930	66%	8,145,174	49%	597,784	7%
Jews	79,198	3%	23,302	1%	322,947	8%	123,202	2%	548,649	3%	494,913	5%
Poles	810,834	26%	1,310,099	61%	3,558,489	85%	2,184,329	30%	7,863,751	47%	7,817,377	86%
Other	17,773	?%	4,666	?%	11,984	?%	136,578	?%	171,001	?%	171,001	?%
^{1} Estimates according to Nazi German Bureau for Racial Policies, 25 November 1939.

Heinemann (2003) gives identical numbers for Reichsgau Danzig-West Prussia and Warthegau. For East Upper Silesia, Heinemann gives numbers based on the Nazi census of December 1939, that claimed they were 2.43 million people, of whom ~1.08 million were ethnic Germans, ~930,000 Poles, and ~90,000 Jews. Heinemann and Encyclopaedia Judaica also give a higher estimate regarding the Jewish population, whose number they put between 560,000 and 586,628 people. Eberhardt (2006) confirms the number given by the Bureau for Racial Policy by saying about 600,000 people were Germans.

"The Mass Extermination of Jews in German Occupied Poland", by the Polish government-in-exile addressed to the wartime allies of the then-United Nations, 1942

Prof. Stanisław Waszak (pl) of Poznań University cited slightly differing estimates; first published in 1947:

The 1939 total population of Nazi German Gaue including annexed territories ^{1}
Gau	Total population	Poles	Germans	Jews	Ukrainians	Others
Wartheland	4,933,600	4,220,200	324,600	384,500	–	4,300
Upper Silesia (part added after WWII started)	2,632,630	2,404,670	98,204	124,877	1,202	3,677
Danzig-West Prussia	1,571,215	1,393,717	158,377	14,458	1,648	3,020
East Prussia (part added after WWII started)	1,001,560	886,061	18,400	79,098	8,0099	9,902
Total	10,139,005	8,904,648	599,576	602,953	10,949	20,899
^{1} The Western Review, Supp. Number for Abroad, July and August, 1947, page 49; the 1947 estimates as cited by Stanisław Waszak, Demographic Picture of the German Occupation (1970).

Census data was compiled by Nazi Germany in Danzig-West Prussia on 3 December, and in Warthegau and Upper Silesia on 17 December. A number of Poles tried to present themselves as Germans (Volksdeutsche) hoping to avoid the anti-Polish atrocities or were classified as Germans to meet quotas.

=== Nazi Germanization Plans ===
On 7 October 1939, Hitler appointed Heinrich Himmler as his settlement commissioner, responsible for all resettlement measures in the Altreich and the annexed territories as well as the Nazi-Soviet population exchanges. For his new office, Himmler chose the title Reichskommissar für die Festigung deutschen Volkstums ("Reich's commissioner for strengthening Germandom", RKF). The RKF staff (Stabshauptamt RKF) through the Hauptamt Volksdeutsche Mittelstelle (VOMI) and the 'Main Department of Race and Settlement' (Rasse- und Siedlungs-Hauptamt, RuSHA) of the SS planned and executed the war-time resettlement and extermination process in the annexed territories. In October 1939, Himmler ordered the immediate expulsion of all Jews from the annexed territories, all "Congress Poles" from Reichsgau Danzig-West Prussia, and all "Reich's enemies" from the Warthegau, South East Prussia and East Upper Silesia. The term "Reich enemies" was applied to all Poles with higher education, engaged in pre-war in any patriotic organisations or initiatives and generally those who manifested Polish patriotism. Those expelled were to be deported to the General Government.

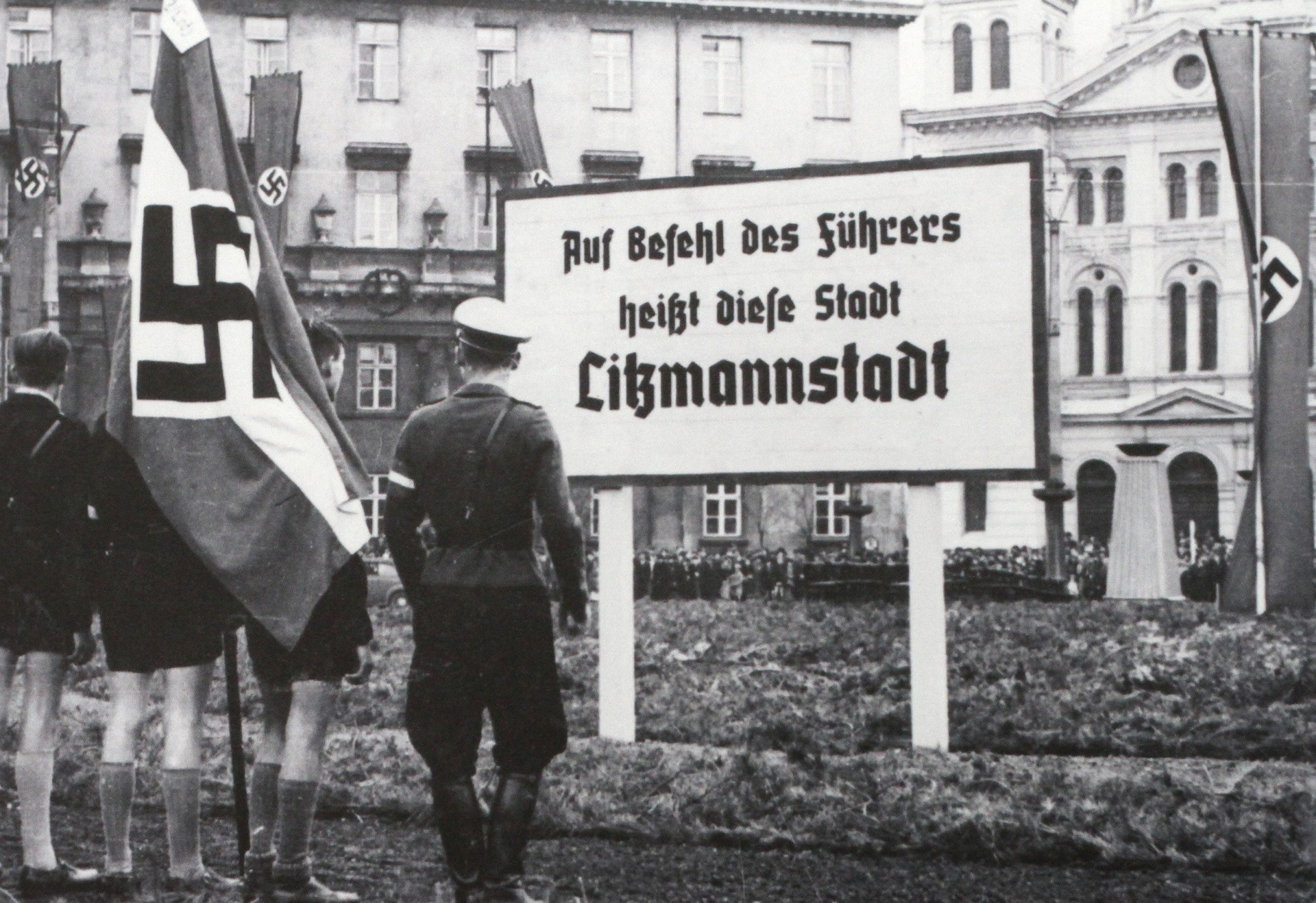
Announcement board in Nazi-occupied Łódź declaring its renaming as "Litzmannstadt", 1940

This directive was superseded by another RKF-directive of early 1940, ordering the immediate expulsion of the remaining Jews and the replacement of 3.4 million Poles with Germans settlers in the long run. This RKF scenario envisioned, as a first step, the settlement of 100,000 German families within the next three years. In this early stage, planners believed the settlers would be relocated from the Altreich. "Racially valuable" Poles were to be exempted from deportation and "racially valuable" ethnic Germans were also to be settled. Himmler said he wanted to "create a blonde province here". Responsible for "racial evaluation" were 'Central Bureau for Immigration' (Einwandererzentralstelle, EWZ) and 'Central Bureau for Resettlement' (Umwandererzentralstelle, UWZ) of the SS' RuSHA. The annexed territories were to be Germanised in rural areas within 5 years and in urban areas within 10 years, the General Government in 15 years

In practice, the war-time population shift in the annexed territories did not take on its planned extent, either in regard to the number of expelled Poles and the resettled Germans, or in regard to the origin of the settled Germans which was the Soviet Union. Plans for a resettlement of Germans from Nazi Germany were upheld in the Generalplan Ost but postponed to after the war. This plan envisioned the elimination of all Jews and, in the long run, the deportation of initially 31 million, later 51 million Slavs to Siberia from a large area designated for German settlement. The removal of Poles consisted of such actions as ethnic cleansing, mass executions, organised famine and eradication of national groups by scattering them in isolated pockets for labour. About 350,000 ethnic Germans were settled in Poland after Nazi propaganda persuaded them to leave the Baltic States prior to the Soviet Union's take-over, and subjected to Germanization.

In addition, other Germanic settlers such as Dutch, Danes and Swedes were envisioned to settle these lands. A small Dutch artisan colony was already established in Poznań in 1941.

=== Expulsion and genocide of Poles and Jews ===
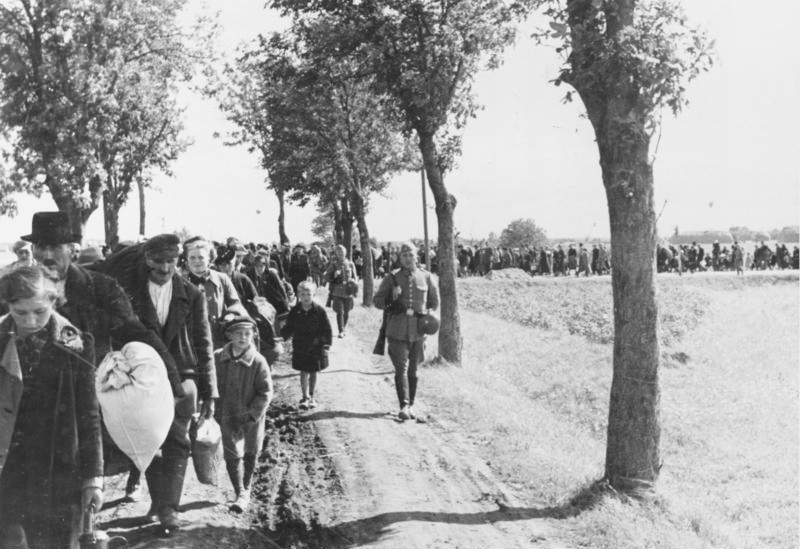
Expulsion of Polish civilians, autumn 1939

The Jewish and Polish population was subject to mass murder and expulsions already during the September invasion, triggering mass flight. The Jewish population was to be resettled but when that proved impossible exterminated. Nazi Concentration camps and extermination camps were set up within the annexed territories including Auschwitz (consisting of several subcamps), Chelmno (Kulmhof), Potulice (Potulitz) and Soldau.

According to Heinemann, about 780,000 ethnic Poles in the annexed territories lost their homes between 1939 and 1944. Of these, at least 250,000 were deported to the General Government, 310,000 were displaced or forced into Polenlager camps within the respective Gau, and the others were subject to forced labour either within the annexed territories or in the Altreich. Heinemann says that according to Madajczyk, 987,217 were displaced in the annexed territories and the Zamość region, including Jews. People were sometimes arrested from the street in so-called łapanki.

Heinemann further says that an additional 110,000 Jews were deported to the General Government. Another more than 400,000 Jews were later deported to Auschwitz, Treblinka or Chelmno (Kulmhof) concentration camps, and thousands had died in the ghettos. Of the deported Jews, more than 300,000 were from Warthegau, 2,000 from Reichsgau Danzig-West Prussia, 85,000 from East Upper Silesia, 30,000 from the Zichenau district and 200,000 from the Białystok district both in South East Prussia.

Eberhardt cites numbers provided by Jastrzębski, 1968, who says that according to RKF documents, 365,000 were deported between 1939 and 1944. Jastrzębski notes that adding the numbers retrieved from documents of local authorities yields a higher total of 414,820 deported, and estimates a total of about 450,000 including unplanned and undocumented expulsions. Eberhardt notes that on top of these numbers, many had fled, and cites numbers provided by Czesław Łuczak (1979), who estimates that between 918,000 and 928,000 were deported or evicted from the annexed territories between 1939 and 1944. A similar estimate (923,000) is also given by the Institute of National Remembrance.

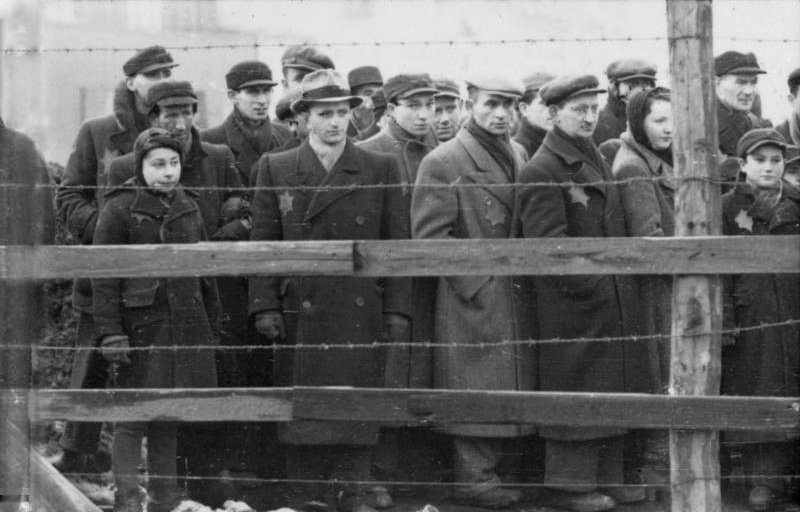
Ghettoization of Jews, Litzmannstadt 1941

Heinemann and Łuczak as cited by Eberhardt detail the expulsions as follows: 81,000 Poles were displaced from their homes in East Upper Silesia, 22,000 of whom were deported to the General Government. They were replaced with 38,000 ethnic Germans primarily from Bukovina. From the Zichenau and Suwałki areas of South East Prussia, 25,000 to 28,000 Poles were "evacuated", an additional 25,000 to 28,000 from the Bialystock area attached in 1941. In Reichsgau Danzig-West Prussia, 123,000 to 124,000 were displaced until the end of 1942, 53,000 of whom were deported to the General Government, the others were forced into camps where they were "racially evaluated". In the Warthegau, 630,000 were displaced between 1939 and 1944. Additionally, Łuczak estimates that between 30,000 and 40,000 were subject to "wild" expulsions primarily in Pomerelia.

Poles due be deported to the General Government were first put in camps where they were subject to racial evaluation (Durchschleusung) by the UWZ similar to the Durchschleusung of ethnic Germans (see below). Those deemed "capable of re-Germanization" (wiedereindeutschungsfähig) were not deported to the General Government, but instead to the Altreich. Those that resisted Germanization were to be put in concentration camps, or executed; their children might be taken for Germanization and adoption. A total of 1.5 million people was expelled or deported, including those deported for slave labor in Germany or concentration camps. Eberhardt says a total of 1.053 million people were deported for forced labour from the annexed territories.

=== German colonization and settlement ===
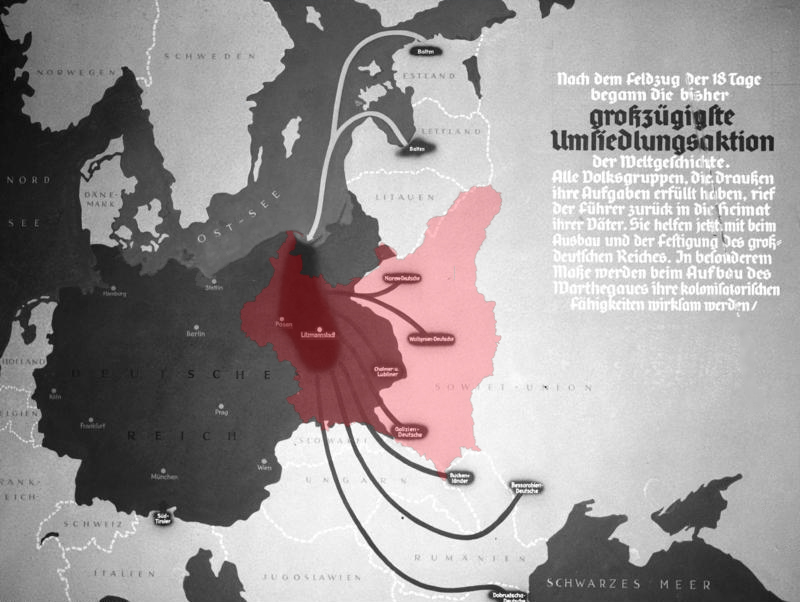
Nazi Germany in 1940 (dark grey) after the conquest of Poland together with the USSR, showing pockets of German colonists resettled into the annexed territories of Poland from the Soviet "sphere of influence" during the "Heim ins Reich" action. – The Nazi propaganda poster, superimposed with the red outline of Poland missing entirely from the original German print.

Throughout the war, the annexed Polish territories were subject to German colonization. The goal of Germany was to assimilate the territories politically, culturally, socially, and economically into the German Reich. According to Esch, because of the lack of settlers from the Altreich, the colonists were primarily ethnic Germans from areas further East. These ethnic Germans were resettled during colonisation action "Heim ins Reich" in homes from which the Poles had been expelled, often so abruptly that they found half-eaten meals on tables and unmade beds where small children had been sleeping at the time of expulsion. Members of Hitler Youth and the League of German Girls were assigned the task of overseeing such evictions to ensure that the Poles left behind most of their belongings for the use of the settlers.

Eberhardt cites estimates for the ethnic German influx provided by Szobak, Łuczak, and a collective report, ranging from 404,612 (Szobak) to 631,500 (Łuczak). Anna Bramwell says 591,000 ethnic Germans moved into the annexed territories, and details the areas of colonists' origin as follows: 93,000 were from Bessarabia, 21,000 from Dobruja, 98,000 from Bukovina, 68,000 from Volhynia, 58,000 from Galicia, 130,000 from the Baltic states, 38,000 from eastern Poland, 72,000 from Sudetenland, and 13,000 from Slovenia.

Additionally some 400,000 German officials, technical staff, and clerks were sent to those areas in order to administer them, according to "Atlas Ziem Polski", citing a joint Polish-German scholarly publication on the aspect of population changes during the war. Eberhardt estimates that the total influx from the Altreich was about 500,000 people.

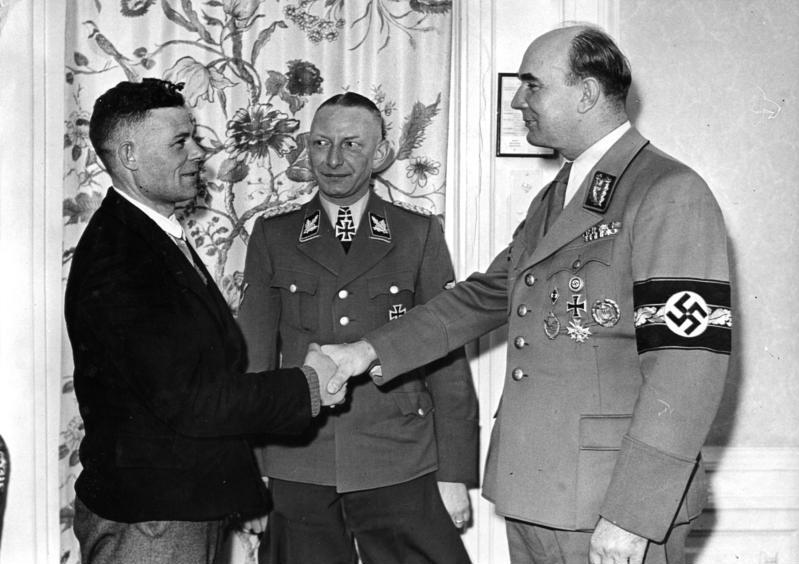
Arthur Greiser welcoming millionth Volksdeutscher resettled during "Heim ins Reich" action from the East Europe to occupied Poland – March 1944

Duiker and Spielvogel note that up to two million Germans had been settled in pre-war Poland by 1942. Eberhardt gives a total of two million Germans present in the area of all pre-war Poland by the end of the war, 1.3 million of whom moved in during the war, adding to a pre-war population of 700,000.

Number of German colonists settled as per Piotr Eberhardt
Area	Number of colonists	%
Warthegau	536,951	85.1%
Reichsgau Danzig-West Prussia	50,204	7.9%
East Upper Silesia	36,870	5.8%
Regierungsbezirk Zichenau	7,460	1.2%

The increase of German population was most visible in the towns: in Poznań, the German population increased from ~6,000 in 1939 to 93,589 in 1944; in Łódź, from ~60,000 to 140,721; and in Inowrocław, from 956 to 10,713. In Warthegau, where most Germans were settled, the share of the German population increased from 6.6% in 1939 to 21.2% in 1943.

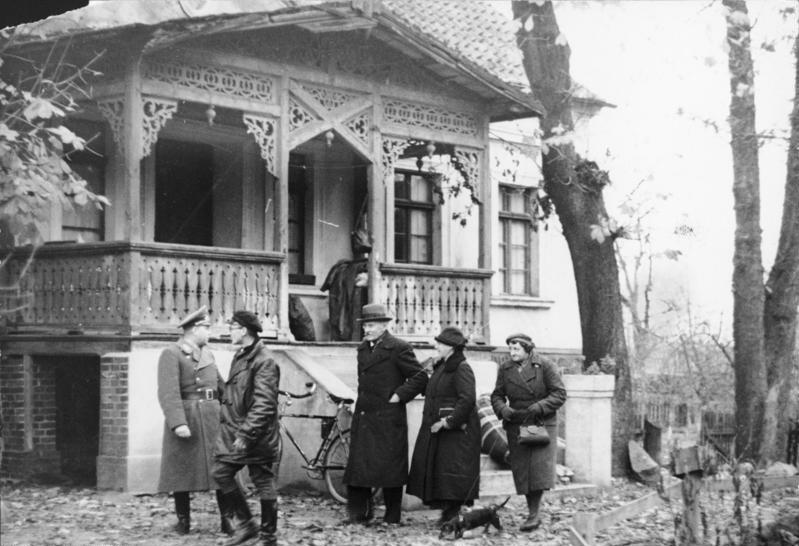
A Nazi official assigns a Polish house in Warthegau to Baltic German resettlers

Only those Germans deemed "racially valuable" were allowed to settle. People were "evaluated" and classified in the Durchschleusung process in which they were assigned to the categories RuS I ("most valuable") to IV ("not valuable"). Only RuS I to III were allowed to settle, those who found themselves in RuSIV were either classified as "A"-cases and brought to the Altreich for "non-selfdetermined work and re-education", or classified as "S"-cases who were either sent back to their original Eastern European homelands or "evacuated" to the General Government. Initially, people classified as RuS III were to be deported to the Altreich for forced labour, yet since January 1940 were allowed to settle on smaller farms (20 hectare compared to 50 hectare farms for RuS I and II). This change was based on a personal order by Himmler and led to a more restrictive categorization by the classifying officials. About a million ethnic Germans had been subjected to Durchschleusung by the end of 1944. RuS I and II were assigned to between 60% and 70% of the Baltic Germans and 44% of the Volhynian Germans, while many ethnic Germans from the Soviet Union were put in the lower categories.

== Ethnic segregation ==
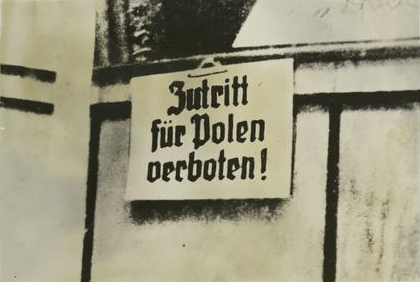
German warning in occupied Poland 1939 – sign "No entrance for Poles!"

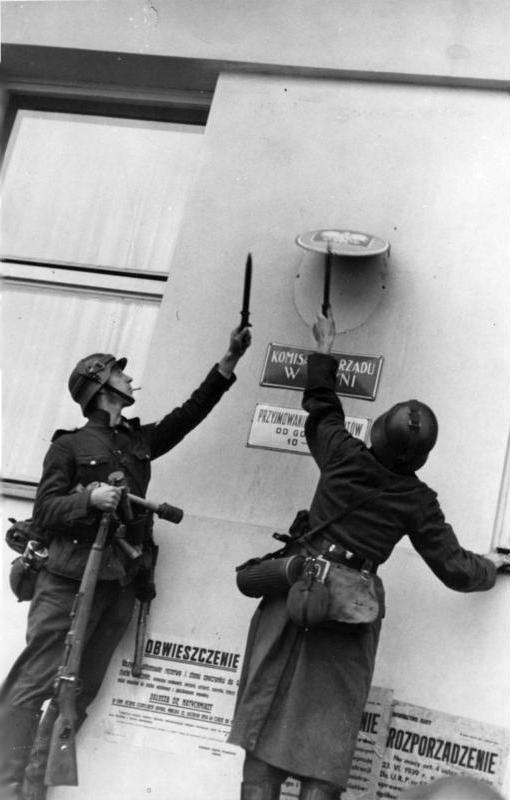
German Wehrmacht soldiers remove Polish signs in Gdynia, renamed Gotenhafen, September 1939.

The segregation of Germans and Poles was achieved by a variety of measures limiting their social interaction.

Łuczak described the segregation:

"Access to a variety of cinemas, theatres, museums, hotels, cafes, restaurants, parks, playgrounds, public transport such as first and second class train departments and best city trolleys, public bathhouses, beaches, public phones and public benches was granted only to Germans, while forbidden by law for Poles and Jews. Poles were not allowed to attend German-held masses. Attending cultural activities or events for non-Germans was punishable, for example in Poznań, four young Polish women who attended an opera were sentenced by German court for 4 months of penal work camp Other laws made it obligatory for Poles to give way to Germans in every occasion on sidewalks, and all Poles were to bow down to Germans as form of greeting. Support for Nazi policies was high among the German minority in the annexed territories Nevertheless as part of their racial policies the German officials forbid friendly or supportive contacts by Germans to Poles and Jews were dealt with quickly and harshly by the authorities by imprisonment in concentration camps, confiscation of property or death sentences. After the Polish decrees became enforced, sexual relations between Germans and Poles were forbidden as Rassenschande (race defilement), a Polish women caught in an affair with a German man were arrested and in some cases forced into a brothel."

Nazi Germany viewed Poles as subhuman, and such views were spread in the media. For example, in October 1939, Nazi propaganda was issued instructing Germans to view Poles, Jews and Gypsies as subhumans. Occasionally, signs were posted in public places reading: "Entrance is forbidden to Poles, Jews, and dogs". When Germans wanted to silence Poles and Jews, they used such expressions, as "stop barking" or "shut your snouts".

Part of the population was classified as Volksdeutsche, mostly German ethnic minority. Some Poles were classified as such as well, either by their own free will or by force which included death threats.

== Repressions against Polish and Jewish population ==
Because Nazi Germany envisioned a near-term complete Germanization of the annexed territories, measures there differed from those implemented in the General Government. Germans and the remaining Poles and Jews were strictly segregated. In case of the Jews, this was achieved by ghettoization.

The German administration classified people based on political and racial criteria with Poles and Jews being considered "untermenschen" (subhumans) as opposed to Germans who according to the Nazi racial ideology were the ubermenschen "herrenvolk" (master race). This classification had not only ideological meaning but was expressed in all aspects of practical daily life and treatment of the population. Three main goals were formulated by German authorities in regards to Polish population: Gradual biological eradication of Polish nation, expulsion out of the annexed areas and use of Poles as forced labour, and changing remaining Poles into obedient low-skilled workers by draconian means.

=== Economic discrimination ===
Many Polish owned buildings and enterprises were confiscated, and all jewelry, furniture, money, and clothing were subject to forced confiscation. All executive positions which were formerly occupied by Poles and Jews were given to Germans. Poles were forbidden to own rural and industrial enterprises, transport firms, building firms, and workshops. The Nazis seized tens of thousands of Polish enterprises, from large industrial firms to small shops, without payment to the owners. Higher taxes and obligatory contributions were enforced on the Polish population. Polish workers were stripped of any right to holidays or leave from work. Payment for overtime hours in work was abolished in general; only after working 61 hours in a week were Poles allowed to receive a 10% higher compensation in pay (Germans were paid 100%). All employed Poles were given the lowest possible pay for their work. Overall the German policy was to create lowly educated slaves out of Poles for basic work.

=== Slave labour ===
While in General Government all Poles from age of 14 to 65 were subject to forced labour on behalf of Nazi German state, in annexed territories children had to work from the age of 9 (and in rural areas from the age of 7–8), additionally the duty to perform slave labour for Germans was extended to the age of 70 for men in annexed territories. A network of outposts overseeing gathering of labour force was established by German authorities that coordinated forced labour together with German police units.

=== Reducing biological growth of Polish population ===
To reduce the biological growth of the Polish people, a partial ban of marriage was introduced; Polish women were allowed to marry only at the age of 25 and men at the age of 28. Married couples were separated when subjected to forced labour in Germany, and calorie intake was lowered for Poles. The forced labour working hours for both parents often meant that a child or infant was left without care and incidents and infant deaths soared. The supply of dairy and fat products for Polish children were just one-fifth of that for German children. Likewise, the winter brought many deaths, as Germans limited the available heating supplies to 1/4 of that available to Germans. A strict ban on collecting coal left by trucks and supply wagons on the streets by non-Germans was introduced.

Poles sent to slave labour from annexed territories according to Nazi German estimates ^{1}
Time period	Number of Poles from annexed territories held in forced labor
13 July 1942	827,000
20 November 1942	896,000
15 February 1943	934,000
31 August 1943	1,066,000
30 June 1944	1,033,000
15 August 1944	1,015,000
30 September 1944	1,053,000
^{1} As cited by Czesław Madajczyk (1970), Polityka III Rzeszy.

Within Germany, OST-Arbeiters could have an abortion, even against their will and contrary to the usual Nazi law against abortions. Only if the parents appeared to be of "good blood" was the child to be born, and if deemed satisfactory, was removed to a Lebensborn institution. Children who failed were sent to the Ausländerkinder-Pflegestätte, where they routinely died within a few months for lack of food.

To further reduce the Polish population, a German official Krumey (de) from occupied Łódź demanded that Polish women be kept at work until reaching 8.5 months of pregnancy. The aim was to help in miscarriage and provoke ‘accidents’ that would result in failed birth. Nevertheless, German officials remained extremely worried about the Polish birth rate and various other ideas floated among the German leadership how to not only reduce pregnancy, but to prevent it. Among the proposals were: garrisoning the population in labour camps, making the age of allowing marriage much higher, creating labour battalions out of the Polish population, introducing a child tax, performing abortions, an extended forced work duty during Polish lifetimes, combined with relocation to work camps, and finally sterilization of Polish women. Doubts about the ability to perform mass sterilization hindered this idea, however, as 55% of available doctors in certain parts of annexed territories were Poles and it was thought they would sabotage the action. The German state organization SD performed its own study on the problem. Among the things it concluded was that the number of Poles was wrongly estimated in initial years; however, both the birth rate and survival of German children was higher than that of the Poles. The proposed solution to Polish problem was mass sterilization of lower classes (named "primitives" by the report), sending married Poles to slave labour in the Reich. An original idea was proposed by Karl Zieger, who believed those measures to be futile. Instead, he postulated that whole Polish villages should be moved and scattered into the Reich itself.

The Nazis fell into a trap of perception—the seemingly high birth rate of Poles was a result of expelling all Poles from higher classes into the General Government; as such the Poles who remained were those with high birth rate, while those with few children were no longer present. Stripping Poles of all cultural activity by the Germans and leaving them to spend all time outside of work in homes, led to conditions favourable to sex and a rising birth rate. One practice that had terrible effects on Polish women was the refusal for female slave workers to travel home for birth. Pregnancies by Polish women-workers were subject to abortion, and in case of birth, the children were taken by SS Lebensborn. Polish slave labourers naturally were forbidden to marry. The harsh nature of the German occupation however reduced the birth rate. In Poznań, at the end of the war, the birth rate was near zero; in Łódź and Inowrocław there were more deaths than births. In comparison, the birth rate of Germans rose until the end of the war. From 1939's birth rate survival of 850 live births per 1000 births, the rate fell to 680 per 1000 births in 1944.

=== Discrimination against the Polish language ===
A ban on the use of the Polish language was implemented in all institutions and offices in annexed territories, as well in certain public places like public transport in the cities.

A particular form of oppression was a law ordering the Poles to use German in all contacts with officials under penalty of imprisonment. Poles who did not know German had to hire a translator; however, such jobs were restricted to German authorities, and Poles with knowledge of German who helped their countrymen for free were imprisoned. This law covered all contacts between Poles and Germans and made it difficult, if not impossible, for Poles to pay obligatory taxes (which were higher for Poles) and various state-imposed donations for German society by Poles. A total ban on Polish language was proposed during the war, but as the areas still contained a large number of Poles, it was determined to be impractical at the time of the proposal. A particular form of harassment was a law requiring imprisoned Poles to communicate with their families solely in German. In practice, this meant that many families received no information on their relatives as correspondence in Polish was confiscated.

=== Discrimination in education ===
Education standards for Poles were significantly lowered, so that future Poles would become slaves to Germans. All Polish schools and cultural institutions were closed. Teaching of history, literature and geography to Poles was prohibited. Further education for "racially valuable" children was to be provided by removing the child to Germany for Germanization.

In some regions, schools for children were established where according to directives of Himmler:

For the non-German population of the East there can be no type of school above the four-grade rudimentary school. The job of these schools should be confined to the teaching of counting (no higher than up to 500), the writing of one's name, and the teaching that God's commandment means obedience to the Germans, honesty, industry and politeness. Reading I do not consider essential.

Writing and reading were not taught. Even so, such schools covered a small number of Polish children, for example in Łódź only one-tenth of children between 9 and 13 attended them. Often under the cover of education, the Germans organised child labour, sending the children to perform hard physical work.

The Polish population was banned from performing or creating any type of music and from owning radio receivers. Distribution of Polish books was forbidden and persecuted by the German police; at the same time, Polish libraries were closed and many of their possessions destroyed. Millions of books were lost in this manner. Lending Polish books was a punishable offense for which one could be sentenced to concentration camps. Additionally, education that would enable Poles possessing skills needed in manufacturing and trade was forbidden. Poles were banned from undertaking any exams for craftsmen. Throughout the whole occupation, this law was strictly observed. In Poznań, Germans collected all Polish books and burned them.

In 1939 Polish teachers created Secret Teaching Organization an underground Polish educational organization to provide underground education in occupied Poland. Thousands of its members were arrested and killed by the Germans. It is estimated that about 15% of Polish teachers or 8,000 died during the occupation period. Extermination of teachers and scientists was part of a Nazi plan to eliminate all Polish intelligentsia during action Intelligenzaktion.

=== Religious discrimination ===
The German state's fight during the war to destroy the Polish nation covered religious life of Poles as well. Jewish Poles were hit the worst since those who had survived the first murderous actions against them in the course of the invasion were all expelled from German-annexed Poland to German-occupied Poland. Especially outspoken advocates of Judaism and all rabbis were at high risk of being murdered by the German occupiers. All synagogues were expropriated, diverted and misused, or destroyed. The same fate hit many Jewish cemeteries.

Catholic Germans of Polish ethnicity and the German state had clashed in a struggle for the unadulterated Roman Catholic faith in events like the Kulturkampf of the 19th century. In those regions of Germany with a considerable ethnic Polish population, the Catholic Church mobilised Polish resistance during the Prussian partitions of Poland and served as a stronghold of Polish identity. Due to this, the Nazis targeted it in the newly annexed territories. In the General Government the attitude of Nazis was different, as it was to serve as temporary work camp and reservation for Poles and they wanted the Church as a tool to control Poles (this also meant imprisonment or execution of priests who opposed Nazi plans). The Nazi fight against Polish parts of Catholic Church was also a problem for the Catholic Church in Germany, where many priests supported nationalist claims during the war and were faced with a split of the Church itself as Polish Catholics were persecuted. Overall the German hierarchy silently accepted (and in some cases supported or encouraged) the discrimination and treatment of Poles as Untermenschen, with notable individual exceptions who either protested or tried to help their fellow church members of non-German ethnicity.

In time, as the war continued, the growing split between German Catholics and the persecuted Polish church facing destruction worried the Vatican and the Pope himself. The annexed parts of Poland covered the dioceses located in Gniezno, Poznań, Chełmno, Katowice, Włocławek, most of Łódź and Płock, as well parts of the Warsaw diocese, Łomża, Częstochowa, and Kielce. The German authorities in line with the policy of total Germanisation aimed to completely destroy the Catholic Polish church in those locations and replace it with Catholic German priests and structures. Catholic Polish priests were to be either expelled or killed.

The main contact point for the Nazis in those plans was Carl Maria Splett, bishop of Danzig and a member of the Polish conference of bishops before 1939, who held close relations to the Nazi Albert Forster, and pursued plans to replace Polish clergy with German ones. Another notable German member of the clergy was archbishop Adolf Bertram who personally contacted the Vatican with the request to Germanise the Catholic Polish church organisation. With the position of the Catholic Church in Germany threatened itself since 1933 Bertram called for freedom of faith. Their work was helped by the fact that as German terror grew and became widely known many high-ranking members of Catholic Polish clergy sought refuge abroad to save themselves (Germans were murdering elites of Polish nation as part of their plans) and their deputies were prevented from taking office. The earliest victim was the Pomeranian Voivodeship where almost every Catholic Polish church was closed down, robbed and turned ever into some kind of warehouse, stable or depot. Catholic Polish priests faced three waves of arrests after initial massacres. Those who were arrested ended in concentration camps of Dachau and Stutthof. Monasteries were closed, their collection of arts and books stolen or destroyed by Germans. Splett cooperated with Forster and introduced 200 Catholic German priests into Chełmno diocese where he had been appointed as diocesan administrator from December 1939 on. Under his reign Polish priesthood was oppressed, and prayers and masses under his direction praised Hitler. He also issued a ban against use of Polish language in churches. When he banned confessions in Polish in May 1940 the Vatican intervened and ordered that the ban be lifted. Not only did Splett defend his ban, he argued it was to "protect" people making the confessions. After this argument he tried to claim that confessions in Polish are used for "nationalistic means". Eventually Vatican accepted his explanation. Besides banning Polish language, Splett ordered removal of Polish signs and names in graveyards from monuments and graves and in all churches under his jurisdiction. Albert Forster praised Splett's work for Germany.

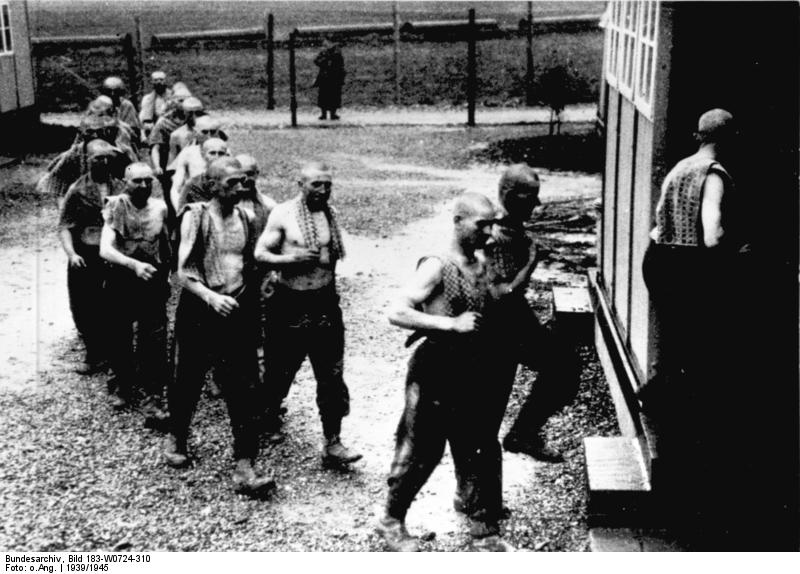
Poles deported for forced labour in a camp in Germany proper

In Wartheland the occupants decided against using German Catholic priests for Germanisation. The Polish Catholic church was to disappear completely. On 13 September 1941 Arthur Greiser issued a decree in which the German administration rejected the existence of churches as legal entities in that Reichsgau. Three weeks later majority of Catholic Polish priests were sent to concentration camps. Out of 6 bishops in the region, only one managed to remain – Walenty Dymek. It was Dymek who through his energetic protests finally started worrying the Vatican that it would eventually lose all of the Polish churches in the region-in no less than 2–3 months. The Vatican, concerned about the possibility of development of German National Catholic Church, intervened and as first step appointed two administrators-one for German and one for Polish population in the region, with Dymek appointed as administrator over the Polish population. The condition of the Roman Catholic Church in Warthegau region was catastrophic – till 1944 up to 1,300 churches and temples were closed, with 500 turned into warehouses, two were simply blown up by the Germans, others were given to congregations of the United Evangelical Church in Wartheland. Cathedrals in Poznań and Włocławek were robbed from their relics and art. Part of the looted art was destroyed by the Germans. In Gniezno the basilica was devastated. In Poznań Catholic press and organizations which formed the religious centre in the religion were destroyed. Most of religious monuments, rural crosses, small chapels were eradicated from the region as well. Access to masses was hindered, and often Germans subjected Polish worshippers leaving the church to łapanka. Up to 80% of Catholic Polish priests were to be expelled, and massive arrests followed.

The sparse Lutheran congregations of the Evangelical Church of the Augsburg Confession in Poland, e.g. in Bydgoszcz and Poznań, mostly comprising congregants from former Russian Poland, were expelled by the German occupants. Also the situation of the United Evangelical Church in Poland, mostly comprising Poles of German language, deteriorated. While its congregants, if considered by the Nazi occupants to be of good breed for their Germanisation plans in the Wartheland, were treated in a way to win them for the Nazi politics, their church body and confessors of faith underlay the same anticlerical regulations by Arthur Greiser as the Catholics. While the Polish authorities had always protracted their confirmation of the United Evangelical Church in Poland as religious statutory corporation, Greiser had done away with that status for all religious bodies in the Wartheland. Greiser pressed the United Evangelical Church in Poland down to a mere civic association. Greiser's orders as to civic associations allowed only inhabitants who had been living before 1 September 1939 in the area of the Wartheland, and new immigrants – usually of German native language – from Soviet-annexed states (eastern Poland, Baltic states) to join these associations and only if they were not German citizens. Thus even General Superintendent Paul Blau, spiritual leader of the United Evangelical Church, who had been tolerated by the Polish authorities, although no Polish citizen, was declared a non-member of his own church body downgraded to an association, because he bore the German citizenship.

In 1940 Hanns Kerrl, the Reich's minister of church affairs, tried to usurp competence over congregations in Danzig-West Prussia and the Wartheland. While he succeeded in Danzig-West Prussia, Greiser – with the help of Hitler – repelled Kerrl's attempt in the Wartheland. The United Evangelical Church in Poland congregations in the Pomeranian Voivodeship could receive the status as statutory corporations – although in a dictatorship this meant little. However, therefore the church body split, its Pomerellian congregations merged in the new old-Prussian rather provisional Ecclesiastical Region of Danzig-West Prussia in 1940. The remaining United Evangelical Church in Poland had to rename into the United Evangelical Church in the Wartheland. While all Jewish clerics, and most Catholic and Lutheran clerics of Polish native language had been removed from their functions, often even killed or enjailed, pastors of the United Evangelical Church were tolerated as long they were not convicted for speaking up against the crimes in the Wartheland.

Number of Catholic Polish priests killed within the territories annexed to the German Reich ^{1}
Church diocese	Polish priests in 1939	Perished	Percentage	Murdered	Died in prisons & camps
Chełmno	634	303	47,8 %	230	73
Katowice	489	43	8,7 %	6	37
Kielce	357	13	3,6 %	2	11
Kraków	680	30	4,4 %	3	27
Łomża	292	48	16,4 %	12	36
Łódź	347	126	36,8 %	9	119
Gniezno	369	180	48,8 %	17	163
Płock	382	109	28,5 %	4	105
Poznań	681	212	31,1 %	1	211
Włocławek	433	213	49,2 %	32	181
Warsaw	657	82	12,4 %	32	50
^{1} Statistical data according to Czesław Madajczyk (1970), Polityka.

Eventually Germans abandoned any public justification or explanations regarding arrests and expulsions. From 2,500 Catholic priests in the Warthegau region 752 perished and 1/3 survived the war in prisons and concentration camps. In Poznań out of 800 Catholic Polish priests in 1939, only 34 remained in 1943. In Upper Silesia the Bishop of Katowice, Stanisław Adamski, ordered Poles to pray in German and identify as Germans. Throughout the war Adamski encouraged this with acceptance of Polish Government in Exile, in order to save the local population from German genocide. In monasteries he brought Germans who would represent them to German officials. Nevertheless, at least 60 were closed. To avoid accusations of personal interests, after issuing this call he publicly declared himself Polish. Despite Adamski's actions the Upper Silesian Polish Catholic church was also subject of repression – 43 priests were murdered in concentration camps and prisons, 2 died in executions for their collaboration with Polish resistance, 13 were expelled to General Government (including 2 bishops), several were stripped of their function.

Many Catholic Polish priests were arrested and put into concentration camps or prisons or murdered in executions. Historic churches were destroyed, and in several cases Germans defiled icons or religious items symbolic for Polish people. Poles were forbidden to attend funerals of other Poles unless they were direct and close family of the person which died. Several Catholic Polish churches were closed down. Selected Catholic Polish religious songs banned, while books containing them were confiscated and destroyed. Polish religious organisations were dissolved. In many places objects of religious worship of significance to Poles were destroyed or defiled.

=== Judicial system ===
In judicial system the proceedings against Poles were shortened. In court Poles had no legal protection. Public whipping, beatings of Poles were allowed by German authorities. Public beatings of Poles by Germans were accepted by law as long as the beating did not "lower the productivity of a Pole". German criminal law was introduced on Polish territories annexed to Reich on 6 VI 1940. It contained several parts based solely on racial and ethnic category of the person subject to trial. Special courts were established which were granted right to pass death sentences in quick and easy way. The idea that Poles and Jews just like Germans could stand before the same court was unacceptable to German authorities. The base idea of the law was to put as many as possible violations against German occupation under penalty. Prison as punishment was considered unsuitable and death sentence and whipping preferred in designed projects of the law. Additionally hard labour and very hard labour were introduced as methods of punishment. The core ideology of the law and its motivation was based on racist ideology. As the German Interior Ministry explained the foundation of the law was "Polish guilt which can’t be washed away, and that proves Poles are not worthy of Europe" and that the atrocious nature of Poles is the starting point of the German penal law. The new law gave almost unlimited right to pass death sentences against Poles and imprisonment in concentration camps. For example, in Katowice a special German court passed in 40% of cases deportation to Auschwitz as punishment, and in 60% of cases death penalty. In Białystok in proceedings under the supervision of Alfred Konig, 80% of accused were sentenced to death and 15% – to concentration camps.

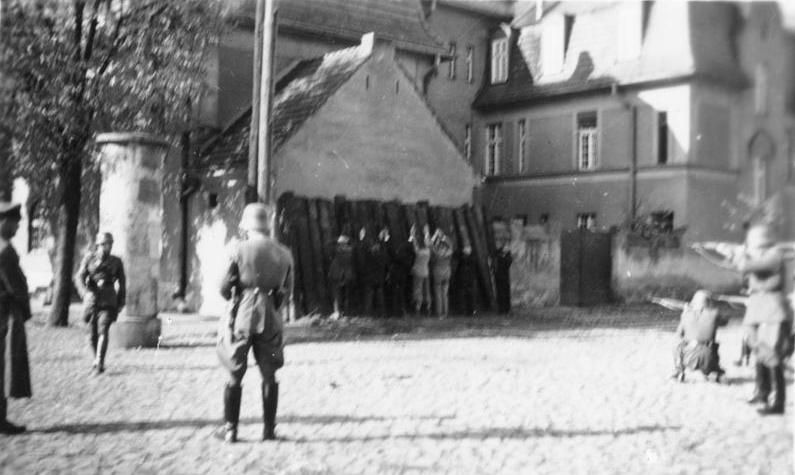
Execution of Poles in Kórnik, Warthegau; 20 October 1939

The harshness of German law was demonstrated by such cases, as 5 months of penal camp for a woman who smiled to English POW's in Ostrów Wielkopolski. A 15-year-old girl who gave a cigarette to a POW was sentenced for 3 months imprisonment in concentration camp. In order to intimidate Polish population a law was passed that ordered obligatory participation in mass executions.

=== Kidnapping and murder of Polish children ===
Polish children were kidnapped for Germanization, forced labour and medical experiments. in annexed territories. They were forbidden to enter playgrounds for German children and their healthcare was lowered resulting in rising deaths among the young.

As the war continued the attitude of Poles changed from hostility to hatred towards the Germans, and while already animosity existed due to German oppression of Poles in the 19th century, the racist and genocidal actions of German state during Second World War heightened this conflict to another level.

=== Consequences ===
The repressive system unified Polish reaction to German occupation, which went above political and ideological differences. The German actions of forced resettlement and deportations in territories annexed by Nazi Germany in the end brought disadvantageous consequences for the German population. The precedent they created was used as justification in the later relocation of the German population.

== Status of German minority ==
In accordance with Nazi racial theory, the Nazis set out to cull German blood out of the mixed population, if necessary by force. Heinrich Himmler declared that no drop of German blood would be lost or left behind for an alien race.

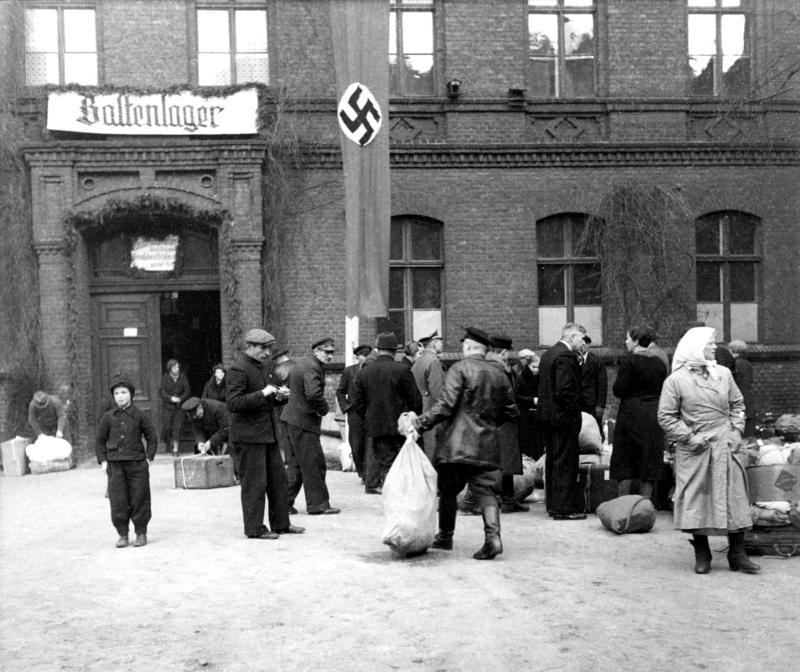
"Baltenlager" (transit camp for Baltic Germans), Poznań 1940

This began with the Volksliste, the classification of people deemed of German blood into different categories: those Germans who had collaborated before the war; those still regarding themselves as German, but who had been neutral; partially Polonised but Germanizable; and those Germans who had been absorbed into Polish nationality. Any person classified as German who resisted was to be deported to a concentration camp. Himmler himself oversaw cases of obstinate Germans, and gave orders for concentration camps, or separation of families, or forced labor, in efforts to break down resistance.

Numerous cultural events were organised for the German community. A network of public schools engaging in various forms of education was set up across the territories. Reich University of Posen was set up in Poznań replacing the former Polish one. At this university, studies of Eastern Europe were conducted, including theories on extermination of non-Germans and means to Germanize the region. Chairs for race policy and Jewish history were established. Local Germans organised in Selbstschutz paramilitia units engaged in arresting Jews and Poles, the oversight of their expulsions, and murder.

Nazi Germany put the Germans in a position to economically exploit the Polish society, and provided them with privileges and a comparably high standard of living at the expense of the Poles, to ensure their loyalty. While certain conditions under Nazi rule were limiting the freedoms of Germans, such as the dissolution of various German religious and political associations, the Nazi regime provided for political, cultural, and material benefits. Germans received executive positions from which people classified as "Untermenschen" were removed. German was made the only official language. Germans received the right to enter any Polish home at will to perform revision and identification of people living there at any time, and could acquire possessions from Poles and Jews with little effort and mostly without payment or at a low price. For example, a German could easily request a Polish house or apartment from the government, even if Poles were still living there. As the overwhelming majority of Germans in annexed authorities supported Nazi authorities and their policies, this gave the Nazi politicians a degree of self-confidence based on popular support. In Warthegau alone out of 309,002 Germans, 180,000 served in various organizations that provided assistance and were vital to Nazi plans against Poles and Jews. They provided invaluable due to their knowledge of local conditions and society. Motives for cooperation ranged from ideological support for Nazism to material opportunism.

Polish diaries and memoirs from the era remember Volksdeutsche as particularly brutal and ruthless group. Pomerania was noted as a region with very strong pro-Nazi German society by Polish observers as well as Łódź. Support for German nationalism was especially evident in regard to the young part of the population, which was strongly influenced by Nazi ideology. The mass conscription of young Germans into the military by 1942 was greeted with relief by the Polish population. When trains with wounded and crippled German soldiers started returning from Eastern Front they were welcomed alongside train tracks by groups of celebrating Polish population. Local Germans were rewarded for their support in the genocide of Jews and Poles and invasion of Poland by high positions in administration and increased their wealth by confiscations of Polish and Jewish property. The German colonists were of wide origin and their image varied. The ones from Bessarabia were considered the worst. In all however was noted an infinite support for Hitler and belief in the German state's supremacy. Many were thankful for material benefits provided by the German state. In time their attitude towards local Poles grew in harshness and ruthlessness. While some initially talked to Poles, in time as they soaked up Nazi ideology, this stopped, and some turned to violence against Poles. On farms the Poles were treated by Germans as farm animals, and some Germans treated their dogs more humanely than Polish slave labourers. Only 529 cases of friendly contacts between Poles and Germans were reported by German police in 1941 out of 786,000 Germans located in Wartheland.

=== Case study-Mława district ===
A case study of relationship of Germans towards Poles was conducted by Polish Home Army unit in Mława. From the start of the war till spring 1942 Polish Underground performed a thorough analysis of 1,100 Germans and their actions and behaviour towards the Polish population. Out of those, 9 Germans engaged in friendly relationship with Poles or tried to help them (among those were 3 craftsmen, 3 policeman, 1 camp guard, 1 administration official). The group who took supported Nazis and engaged in despicable acts was much larger.

== Post-war changes ==
None of the Nazi-ordered territorial changes were recognised by the Allies of World War II, and the annexed territories became the centre of the People's Republic of Poland after World War II. Germans living in the formerly annexed territories fled or were expelled to post-war Germany. In post-war Poland, some captured German Nazis and collaborators were put on trial. West Germany did not extradite people charged in Poland.

== See also ==
- Administrative division of Polish territories during World War II
- Areas annexed by Nazi Germany
- Czesław Łuczak
- Former eastern territories of Germany
- Polish areas annexed by the Soviet Union
- Territorial changes of Poland
- The Holocaust
- Treatment of the Polish citizens by the occupiers
- World War II atrocities in Poland
