= Subdivisions of Polish territories during World War II =

Division of interwar Poland by the occupying powers
- 1939–41
- Fourth Partition of Poland – aftermath of the Nazi–Soviet Pact; division of Polish territories in the years 1939–1941
- 1941–44
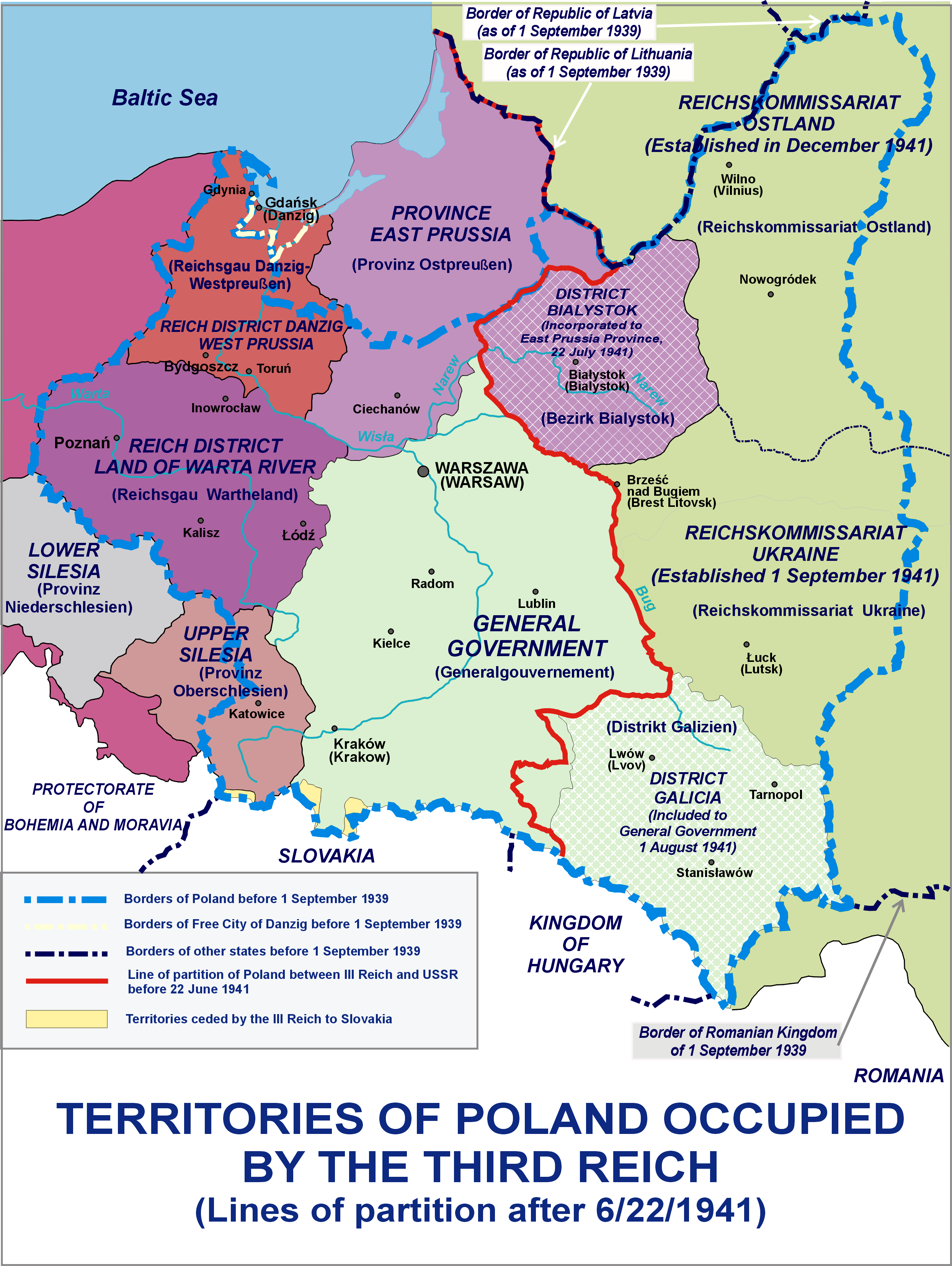
- Changes in administration of Polish territories following the German invasion of the Soviet Union in 1941. The map shows the state in 1944

Subdivision of Polish territories during World War II can be divided into several phases. The territories of the Second Polish Republic were first administered first by Nazi Germany (in the west) and the Soviet Union (in the east), then (following the German invasion of the Soviet Union) in their entirety by Nazi Germany, and finally (following Soviet push westwards) by the Soviet Union again. In 1946, administrative control of the areas not annexed by the Soviet Union was returned to Poland.

After Germany and the Soviet Union conquered Poland in 1939, they partitioned the country. Germany took most of the ethnically Polish territory. The area annexed by the Soviet Union was ethnically diverse: Poles were the largest single ethnic group, but there were non-Polish majorities in some regions: Ukrainians in the south and Belarusians in the north. Many of these people had felt alienated in the interwar Poland and welcomed the Soviets.

== Soviet zone (1939–1941) ==
By the end of the Polish Defensive War the Soviet Union had taken over 52.1% of the territory of Poland (circa 200,000 km^{2}), with over 13,700,000 people. The estimates vary; Professor Elżbieta Trela-Mazur gives the following numbers in regards to the ethnic composition of these areas: 38% Poles (ca. 5.1 million people), 37% Ukrainians, 14.5% Belarusians, 8.4% Jews, 0.9% Russians and 0.6% Germans. There were also 336,000 refugees from areas occupied by Germany, most of them Jews (198,000). Areas occupied by the USSR were annexed to Soviet territory, with the exception of area of Wilno, which was transferred to Lithuania, although soon attached to USSR, when Lithuania became a Soviet republic.

Under the terms of the Molotov–Ribbentrop pact, adjusted by agreement on 28 September 1939, the Soviet Union, annexed all Polish territory east of the line of the rivers Pisa, Narew, Bug and San, except for the area around Wilno (Vilnius), which was given to Lithuania, and the Suwałki region, which was annexed by Germany. These territories were largely inhabited by Ukrainians and Belarusians, with minorities of Poles and Jews (see exact numbers in Curzon line). The total area, including the area given to Lithuania, was 201,000 square kilometres, with a population of 13.5 million. A small strip of land that was part of Hungary before 1914, was also given to Slovakia.

== German zone (1939–1945) ==
=== Annexation of selected Polish territories ===
Under the terms of two decrees by Hitler (8 October and 12 October 1939), large areas of western Poland were annexed to Germany. These included all the territories taken by Prussia in Partitions of Poland which Germany subsequently lost under the 1918 Treaty of Versailles, including the Polish Corridor, Wielkopolska, as well as territories divided after plebiscites such as Upper Silesia, as well as a large area east of these territories, including the city of Łódź.

The area of these annexed territories was 94,000 square kilometres and the population was about 10 million, the great majority of whom were Poles. The annexed parts were controlled by a German administration ruled by a Gauleiter, a system similar in practice to that of the Reich itself. Nearly 1 million Poles were expelled from this German ruled area, while 600,000 Germans from eastern Europe and 400,000 from the German Reich were settled there.

Nazi German administrative units		Annexed administrative units	
Reichsgau/Gau (province)	Regierungsbezirk (government region)	Polish voivodeship/ State	Counties
Reichsgau Wartheland (Warthegau) initially Reichsgau Posen	Posen; Hohensalza; Litzmannstadt^{5}	Poznań	all counties
Reichsgau Wartheland (Warthegau) initially Reichsgau Posen	Posen; Hohensalza; Litzmannstadt^{5}	Łódź	most counties
Reichsgau Wartheland (Warthegau) initially Reichsgau Posen	Posen; Hohensalza; Litzmannstadt^{5}	Pomeranian	five counties
Reichsgau Wartheland (Warthegau) initially Reichsgau Posen	Posen; Hohensalza; Litzmannstadt^{5}	Warsaw	one county
Reichsgau Danzig-West Prussia^{1} (Danzig-Westpreußen) initially Reichsgau West Prussia	Bromberg; Danzig^{1} Marienwerder^{1}	Greater Pomeranian	most counties
Reichsgau Danzig-West Prussia^{1} (Danzig-Westpreußen) initially Reichsgau West Prussia	Bromberg; Danzig^{1} Marienwerder^{1}	Free City of Danzig	
East Prussia^{1} (Ostpreußen) southernmost part^{2}	Zichenau; Gumbinnen^{1}	Warsaw	Ciechanów, Działdowo, Maków, Mława, Płock, Płońsk, Przasnysz, Sierpc; parts of Łomża, Ostrołęka, Pułtusk, Sochaczew, Warsaw
East Prussia^{1} (Ostpreußen) southernmost part^{2}	Zichenau; Gumbinnen^{1}	Białystok	Suwałki and part of Augustów
East Prussia^{1} (Ostpreußen) southernmost part^{2}	Bezirk Bialystok (attached in 1941)^{6}	Białystok	Białystok, Bielsk Podlaski, Grajewo, Łomża, Sokółka, Volkovysk, Grodno
(Upper) Silesia^{1,3} (Oberschlesien) easternmost part^{4}	Kattowitz; Oppeln^{1}	Autonomous Silesian	
(Upper) Silesia^{1,3} (Oberschlesien) easternmost part^{4}	Kattowitz; Oppeln^{1}	Kielce	Sosnowiec, Będzin, Zawiercie, Olkusz
(Upper) Silesia^{1,3} (Oberschlesien) easternmost part^{4}	Kattowitz; Oppeln^{1}	Kraków	Chrzanów, Oświęcim, Żywiec
^{1} Gau or Regierungsbezirk only partially comprised annexed territory^{2} the annexed parts are also referred to as "South East Prussia" (German: Südostpreußen)^{3} Gau Upper Silesia was created in 1941, before it was part of Gau Silesia^{4} the annexed parts are also referred to as "East Upper Silesia" (German: Ostoberschlesien)^{5} named after the chief city, Polish: Łódź. The German equivalent Lodz was rendered to Litzmannstadt in 1940, thus the Regierungsbezirk's name was changed accordingly.^{6} not incorporated into, but administered by Gau East Prussia, attached after the Nazi German invasion of the Soviet Union, 1941

=== Creation of General Government ===
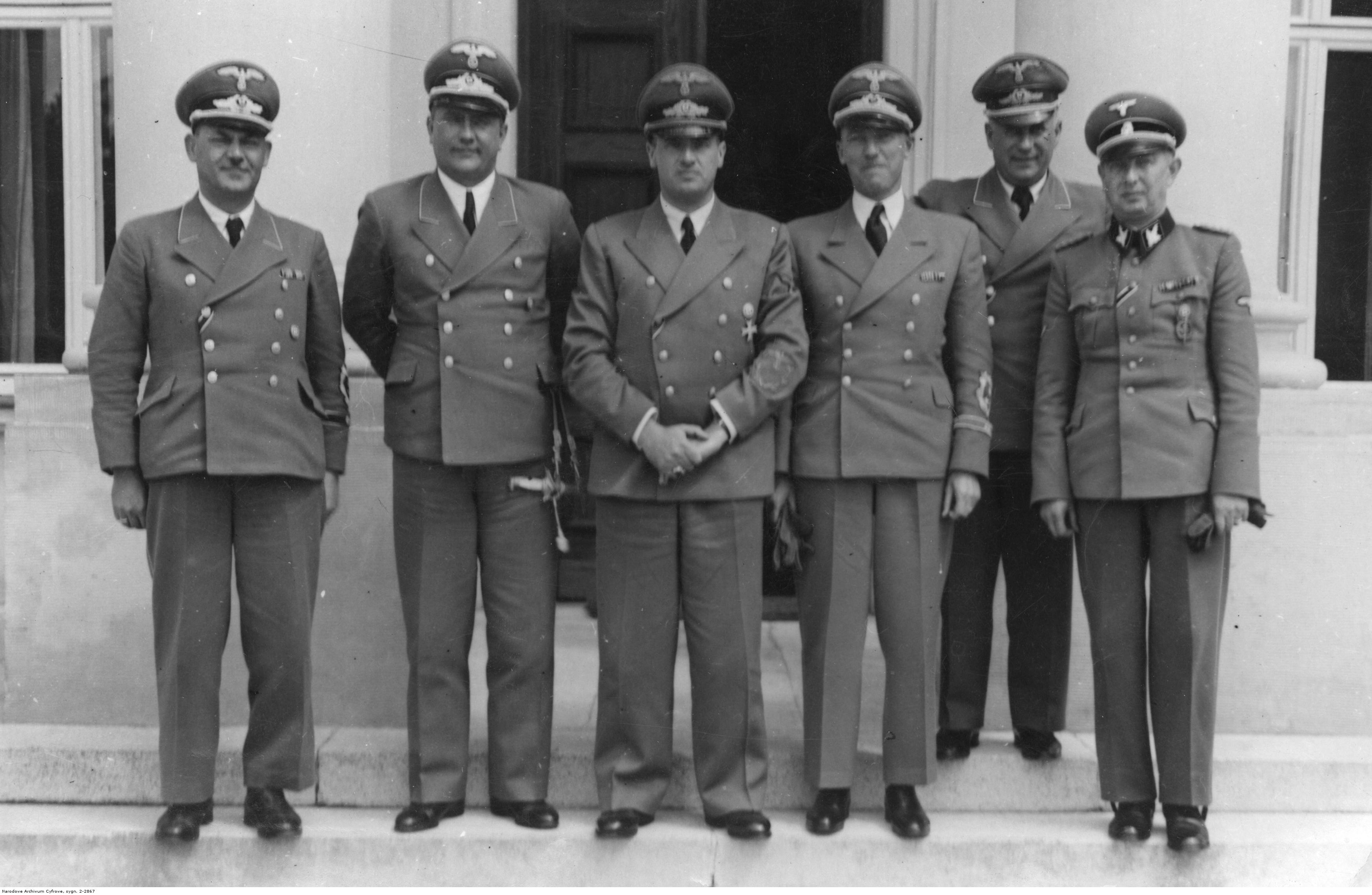
Hans Frank with districts administrators in 1942 from left: Ernst Kundt, Ludwig Fischer, Hans Frank, Otto Wächter, Ernst Zörner, Richard Wendler.

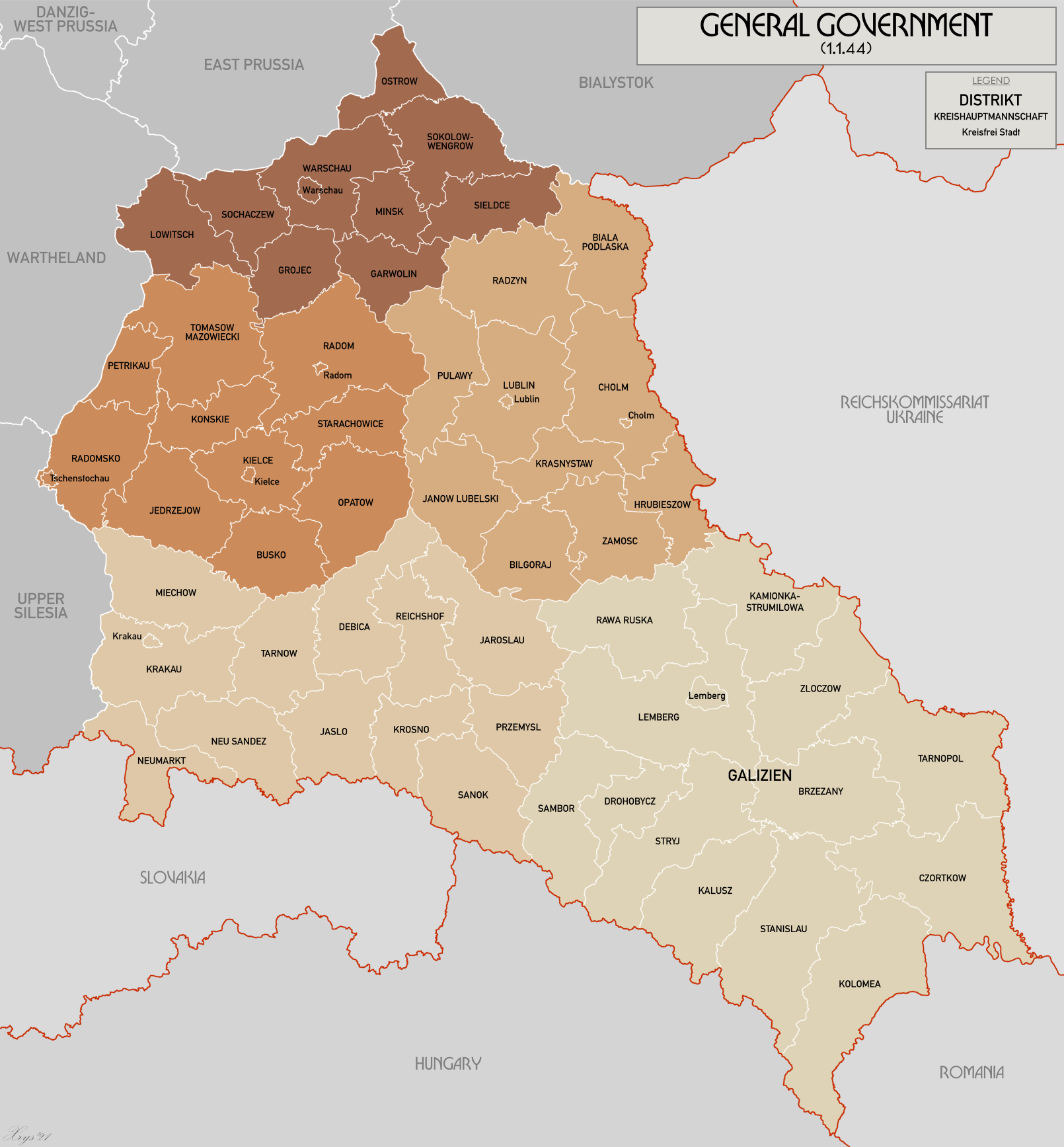
Administrative map of the General Government, August 1941

The remaining block of territory was placed under a German administration called the General Government (in German Generalgouvernement für die besetzten polnischen Gebiete), with its capital at Kraków. The General Government was subdivided into four districts, Warsaw, Lublin, Radom, and Kraków (Distrikt Krakau).

A German lawyer and prominent Nazi, Hans Frank, was appointed "Governor-General of the occupied Polish territories" on 26 October 1939. Frank oversaw the segregation of the Jews into Nazi ghettos in the larger cities, particularly Warsaw, and the use of Polish civilians as forced and slave labour in German war industries.

=== German invasion of the Soviet Union ===
After Operation Barbarossa, the June 1941 German invasion of the Soviet Union, the Polish territories previously annexed to the Ukrainian and Byelorussian republics were organized by the Germans as follows:

- Bezirk Bialystok (district of Białystok), which included the Białystok, Bielsk Podlaski, Grajewo, Łomża, Sokółka, Volkovysk, and Grodno counties, which was "attached to" (but not incorporated into) East Prussia;
- Generalbezirk Litauen – the Vilna Province was incorporated into Lithuania, itself incorporated into the Reichskommissariat Ostland;
- Generalbezirk Weißruthenien – "White Ruthenia" (the western section of modern-day Belarus) was incorporated into the Reichskommissariat Ostland;
- Generalbezirk Wolhynien und Podolien – the Polish province of Volhynia, which was incorporated into the Reichskommissariat Ukraine; and
- East Galicia, which was incorporated into the General-Government and became its fifth district, the Galician District (Distrikt Galizien).

== Return of Soviet administration (1944–1945) ==
Soviet forces returned to former territories of the Second Polish Republic during the 1944 summer offensive, Operation Bagration, specifically in the Lublin–Brest Offensive), leading to Vistula–Oder Offensive of 1945. However, in terms of international politics, a far more important victory was won by Joseph Stalin already in 1943, when the Western Allies yielded to his demands during the Tehran Conference, for the annexation of eastern Poland by the Soviet Union.

With full Soviet control and sponsorship, in July 1944, the Polish Committee of National Liberation (Polski Komitet Wyzwolenia Narodowego, PKWN), a Polish provisional government was formed. Its purpose was to administer the territories earmarked for the return to the newly reformed Poland. Starting with the communist decrees of 1946, the legal powers were passed on to local administration (see Administrative division of People's Republic of Poland).

== Destruction of the Polish Underground State ==
Throughout World War II, Poland had a unique underground administration maintained by the Polish Underground State. For regional divisions of Poland by the underground army known as Armia Krajowa, see areas and regions of operation. Following the German surrender, Soviet agencies such as NKVD and SMERSH proceeded to eliminate all structures originating from the prewar Second Polish Republic. Over 20,000 Poles, including the hero of Auschwitz, Witold Pilecki, were murdered in communist prisons.

== See also ==
- German military administration in occupied Poland
