= Reichsgau =

Nazi administrative subdivision

NSDAP administrative units, 1944

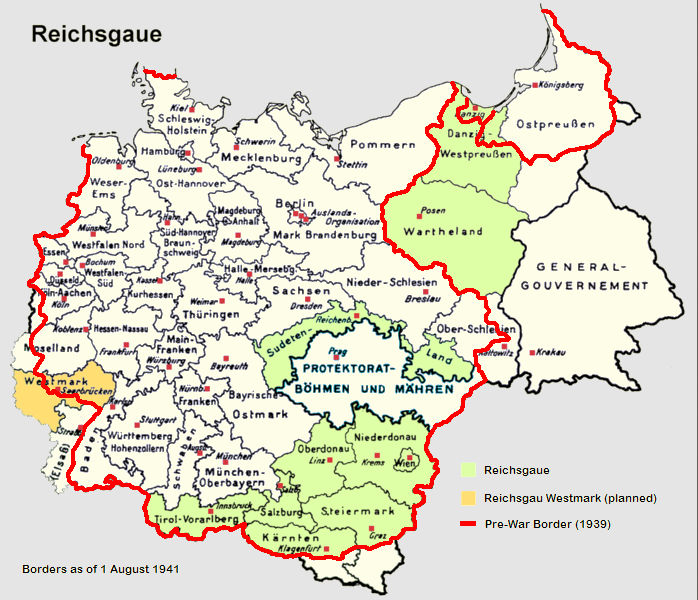
Map of Nazi Germany with Reichsgaue highlighted

A Reichsgau (plural Reichsgaue) was an administrative subdivision created in a number of areas annexed by Nazi Germany between 1938 and 1945.

== Overview ==
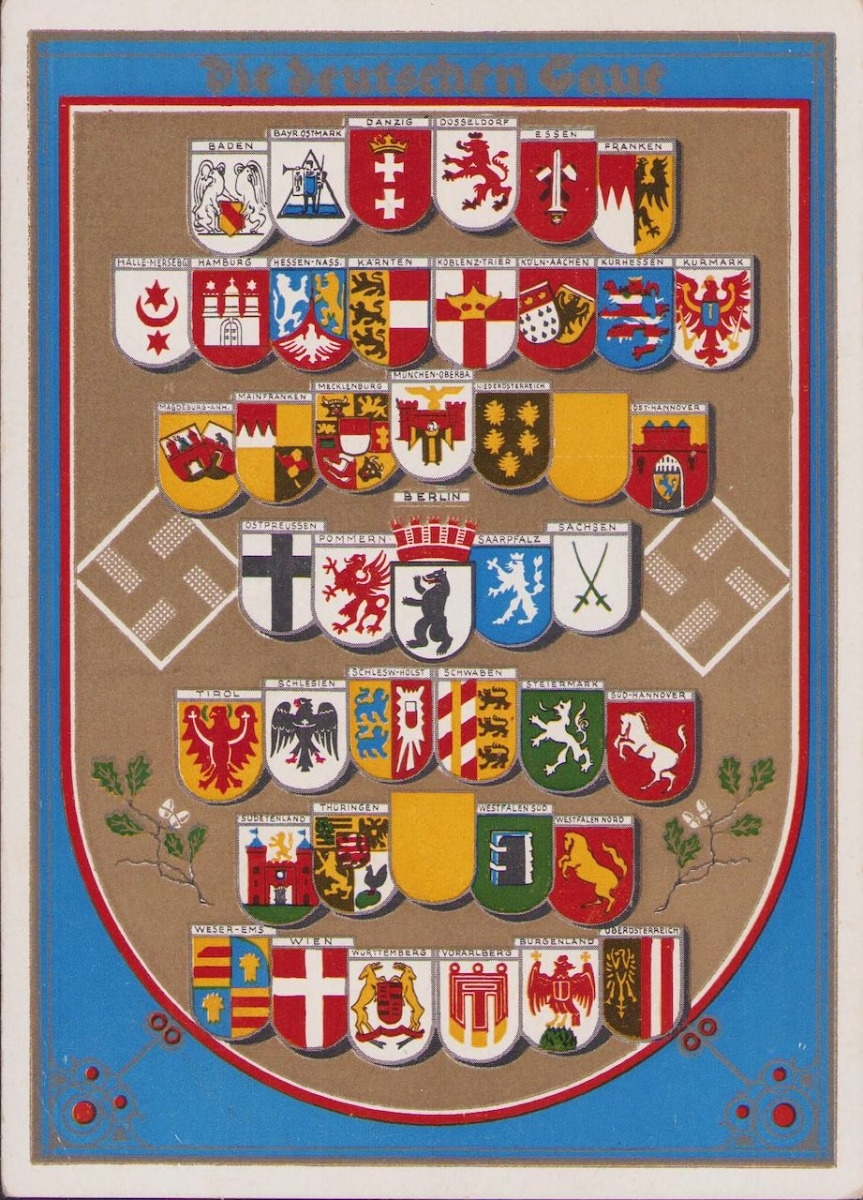
Propaganda postcard of Nazi Germany depicting the Gaue of the Reich and the Nazi Party (October 1939)

The term was formed from the words Reich (realm, empire) and Gau, the latter a deliberately medieval-sounding word with a meaning approximately equivalent to shire. The Reichsgaue were an attempt to resolve the administrative chaos resulting from the mutually overlapping jurisdictions and different boundaries of the NSDAP Party Gaue, placed under a Party Gauleiter, and the federal states, under a Reichsstatthalter responsible to the Ministry of the Interior (in the Prussian provinces, the equivalent post was that of Oberpräsident). Interior Minister Wilhelm Frick had long desired to streamline the German administration, and the Reichsgaue were the result: the borders of party Gaue and those of the federal states were to be identical, and the party Gauleiter also occupied the post of Reichsstatthalter. Rival interests and the influence the Gauleiter wielded with Hitler prevented any reform from being undertaken in the "Old Reich" (German: Altreich), which meant Germany in its borders of 1937 before the annexation of other territories like Austria, the Sudetenland, and Bohemia, and the Reichsgau scheme was therefore implemented only in newly-acquired territories.

There were several Reichsgaue:

- East March (German: Ostmark) formed from the formerly independent Austria
- Sudetenland, formed from a substantial part of the German-speaking outer rim areas of the former Czechoslovakia occupied in 1938
- Danzig-West Prussia (German: Danzig-Westpreußen) and Wartheland, formed from the Free City of Danzig and areas annexed from Poland

The East March was subsequently subdivided into seven smaller Reichsgaue, generally coterminous with the former Austrian Länder (federal provinces).

== List of Reichsgaue ==
=== Reichsgaue in Austria and parts of Czechoslovakia established in 1938 ===
Gau name	German name	Capital	Established	Notes
Carinthia	Kärnten	Klagenfurt	1938	Formed from the former Austrian federal state of Carinthia and Eastern Tyrol, included from 1941 on parts of Slovenia.
Lower Danube	Niederdonau	Krems (see note)	1938	Formed from the former Austrian federal state of Lower Austria and northern Burgenland; included from 1939 on parts of southern Moravia, southeastern Bohemia and the two Bratislava boroughs of Devín and Petržalka. In 1943, Hitler toured Reichsgau Niederdonau and assured Gauleiter Hugo Jury that the capital would be Brünn (Brno) in the near future.
Salzburg	Salzburg	Salzburg	1938	Formed from the former Austrian federal state of Salzburg.
Styria	Steiermark	Graz	1938	Formed from the former Austrian federal state of Styria and southern part of Burgenland; included from 1941 on parts of Slovenia.
Sudetenland	Sudetenland	Reichenberg	1938	Formed from the predominantly German-speaking parts of Czechoslovakia that were ceded to Germany after the Munich Agreement.
Tirol-Vorarlberg	Tirol-Vorarlberg	Innsbruck	1938	Formed from the former Austrian federal state of Vorarlberg and the northern part of Tyrol; Kleinwalsertal became part of the Gau Swabia.
Upper Danube	Oberdonau	Linz	1938	Formed from the former Austrian federal state of Upper Austria and Ausseerland, a part of Styria; included from 1939 on parts of southern Bohemia.
Vienna	Wien	Vienna (Wien)	1938	Formed from the former Austrian federal state of Vienna and surrounding parts of former Lower Austria.

=== Reichsgaue established during the Second World War ===
Gau name	German name	Capital	Established	Notes
Danzig-West Prussia	Danzig-Westpreußen	Danzig	1939	Formed in the Free City of Danzig and the Polish region of the Pomeranian Voivodeship, which were both occupied by Germany in 1939.
Flanders	Flandern	Antwerp (Antwerpen)	1944	Formed in the Flemish Region of Belgium, comprising the Dutch-speaking provinces of Antwerp, Limburg, East Flanders, West Flanders, the arrondissement of Brussels (except the city of Brussels itself), and the arrondissement of Leuven in the then-province of Brabant (the present-day province of Flemish Brabant).
Wallonia	Wallonien	Liège (Lüttich)	1944	Formed in the Belgian region of Wallonia, comprising the Francophone provinces of Hainaut, Liège except the cantons of Eupen, Malmedy and Sankt Vith, Luxembourg, Namur, and the arrondissement of Nivelles in the contemporary province of Brabant (now part of the separate province of Walloon Brabant).
Wartheland	Wartheland	Poznań (Posen)	1939	Formed primarily in the Polish region of the Poznań Voivodeship as well as southern areas of Pomeranian and the western half of Łódź Voivodeship after the German occupation of Poland.

=== Planned Reichsgaue that were never established ===
Gau name	German name	Capital	Notes
Upper Rhine	Oberrhein	Strasbourg (Straßburg)	Formed out of the Gau Baden and Alsace, formerly part of Alsace-Lorraine.
Moselland	Moselland	Koblenz	Was established as a Gau, but not as Reichsgau. Formed out of the pre-war Gau Koblenz-Trier and Luxembourg.
West March	Westmark	Saarbrücken	Was established as a Gau, but not as Reichsgau. Formed out of the Bavarian Rhine Palatinate, the former Territory of the Saar Basin, and parts of Lorraine that were a component of Alsace-Lorraine.
Banat/Prince-Eugene-Land	Banat / Prinz-Eugen-Land	Belgrade (Belgrad, or to be renamed to Prinz-Eugen-Stadt)	To be formed out of the Yugoslavian territories of Bačka, Syrmia, and Banat, parts of Transylvania (Siebenbürgen) and Baranya. To be named for Prince Eugene of Savoy (1663–1736), Austrian general who had a famous victory at the Siege of Belgrade (1688). To be inhabited by Danube Swabians.
Beskidland	Beskidenland	Kraków (Krakau)	To be formed out of the southern parts of conquered Poland between the area west of Kraków to the San river in the east. It was to substantially correspond to the upper Vistula river basin. It was to be almost identical in size to Weichselland and Galizien. Named for the Beskids mountain range.
Brabant	Brabant	Not specified.	To be formed out of central parts of Belgium.
Burgundy	Burgund	Nancy (Nanzig) or Geneva (Genf) or Dijon	To be formed out of the territories of eastern France (excluding Alsace-Lorraine and Nord-Pas-de-Calais) that were to be annexed into Germany after the war. Also to be included to the Reichsgau were parts of Western Switzerland.
Galicia	Galizien	Lviv (Lemberg)	Corresponding to the Podolian plain. It was to be almost identical in size to Beskidenland and Weichselland.
Gothland	Gotenland	Simferopol (to be renamed to Gotenburg)	To be formed out of the Crimean peninsula and large parts of mainland Ukraine. Named for the Goths.
North March	Nordmark	Not specified.	To be formed out of Denmark.
Vandalland	Vandalenland	Not specified, probably Litzmannstadt (Łódź).	To be formed out of part or all of the area of the General Government. Named for the Vandals.
Vistulaland	Weichselland	Warsaw (Warschau)	To be formed out of the middle Vistula river basin. It was to be almost identical in size to Beskidenland and Galizien.
Westland/Holland	Westland / Holland	Not specified.	To be formed out of the Netherlands after its intended annexation into Germany.

=== Planned Reichsgaue for a post-Nazi Germany ===
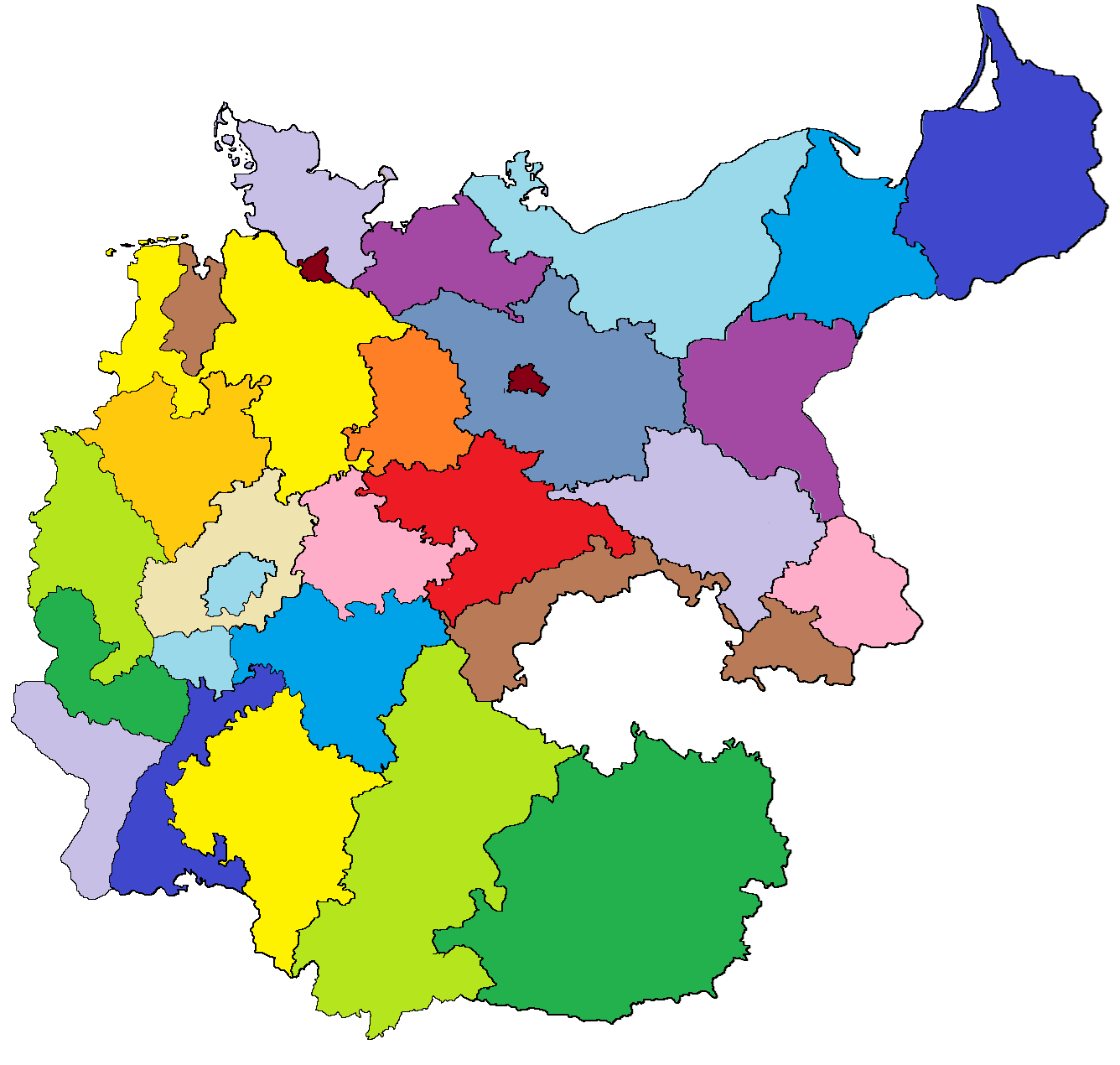
Approximate borders of the proposed Reichsgaue by Goerdeler and Beck

The conservative wing of the German resistance to Nazism, namely Ludwig Beck and Carl Goerdeler, had planned to divide all of Germany (in the borders of 1938 plus the pre-1918 Prussian lands) after a successful takeover of the government into Reichsgaue, modeled after the counties in the UK and the provinces of Prussia. According to Goerdelers 1941 memorandum Das Ziel («The Goal»), every Gau should have been self-administered by a Gau Landtag and overseen by a Oberpräsident (similar to a British lord-lieutenant). In every Gau, there should have been a Gau court (i. e. Oberlandesgericht), a Gau attorney, and a Gau president of each the Reichsbahn, the Reichspost, and the revenue services.

Gau name	German name	Notes
East Prussia	Ostpreußen	To be formed out of the Prussian Province of East Prussia in the 1918 borders
West Prussia	Westpreußen	To be formed out of the Reichsgau Danzig-Westpreußen, roughly corresponding to the former Province of West Prussia
Wartheland	Wartheland	To be formed out of the Reichsgau Wartheland, roughly corresponding to the former Province of Posen
Upper Silesia	Oberschlesien	To be formed out of the Province of Upper Silesia
Lower Silesia	Niederschlesien	To be formed out of the Province of Lower Silesia
Sudetenland	Sudetenland	
Upper Saxony	Obersachsen	To be formed out of Saxony and probably the later Prussian Province of Halle-Merseburg, capital in Dresden
Middle Saxony	Mittelsachsen	To be formed out of Anhalt and the later Prussian Province of Magdeburg
Brandenburg	Brandenburg	To be formed out of the Prussian Province of Brandenburg
Berlin	Berlin	To be formed out of Greater Berlin
Pomerania	Pommern	To be formed out of the Prussian Province of Pomerania
Mecklenburg	Mecklenburg	
Schleswig-Holstein	Schleswig-Holstein	To be formed out of the Prussian Province of Schleswig-Holstein
Lower Saxony	Niedersachsen	To be formed out of the Prussian Province of Hanover, the State of Brunswick and Bremen (state)
Hamburg	Hamburg	
Oldenburg	Oldenburg	To be formed out of the State of Oldenburg
Westphalia	Westfalen	To be formed out of the Prussian Province of Westphalia
Rhineland	Rheinland	To be formed out of the Prussian Regierungsbezirke of Koblenz, Düsseldorf, Cologne and Aachen
Hesse-Nassau	Hessen-Nassau	To be formed out of the Prussian Province of Hesse-Nassau, capital in Kassel
Thuringia	Thüringen	To be formed out of the State of Thuringia and the Prussian Regierungsbezirk Erfurt
Saar-Palatinate	Saarpfalz	To be formed out of the Territory of the Saar Basin, the Bavarian Palatinate and the Regierungsbezirk Trier
Hesse	Hessen	To be formed out of the State of Hesse, capital in Darmstadt
Alsace	Elsass	To be formed out of the German-speaking parts of Alsace and probably German Lorraine, with a high degree of autonomy
Baden	Baden	To be formed out of the State of Baden
Württemberg	Württemberg	To be formed out of the State of Württemberg, Vorarlberg and probably Bavarian Swabia
Bavaria	Bayern	To be formed out of the Bavarian Regierungsbezirke Upper Bavaria, Lower Bavaria and Upper Palatinate and Tyrol (probably including South Tyrol), capital in Munich
Franconia	Franken	To be formed out of the Bavarian Regierungsbezirke Upper Franconia, Middle Franconia and Lower Franconia, capital in Nuremberg
Austria	Österreich	To be formed out of Vienna, Lower Austria, Upper Austria, Styria, Salzburg and Carinthia

== See also ==
- Administrative divisions of Nazi Germany
- Polish areas annexed by Nazi Germany
