= District of Galicia =

WWII Nazi-administered district in Galicia

District of Galicia Distrikt Galizien
- District of General Governorate
- 1941–1944
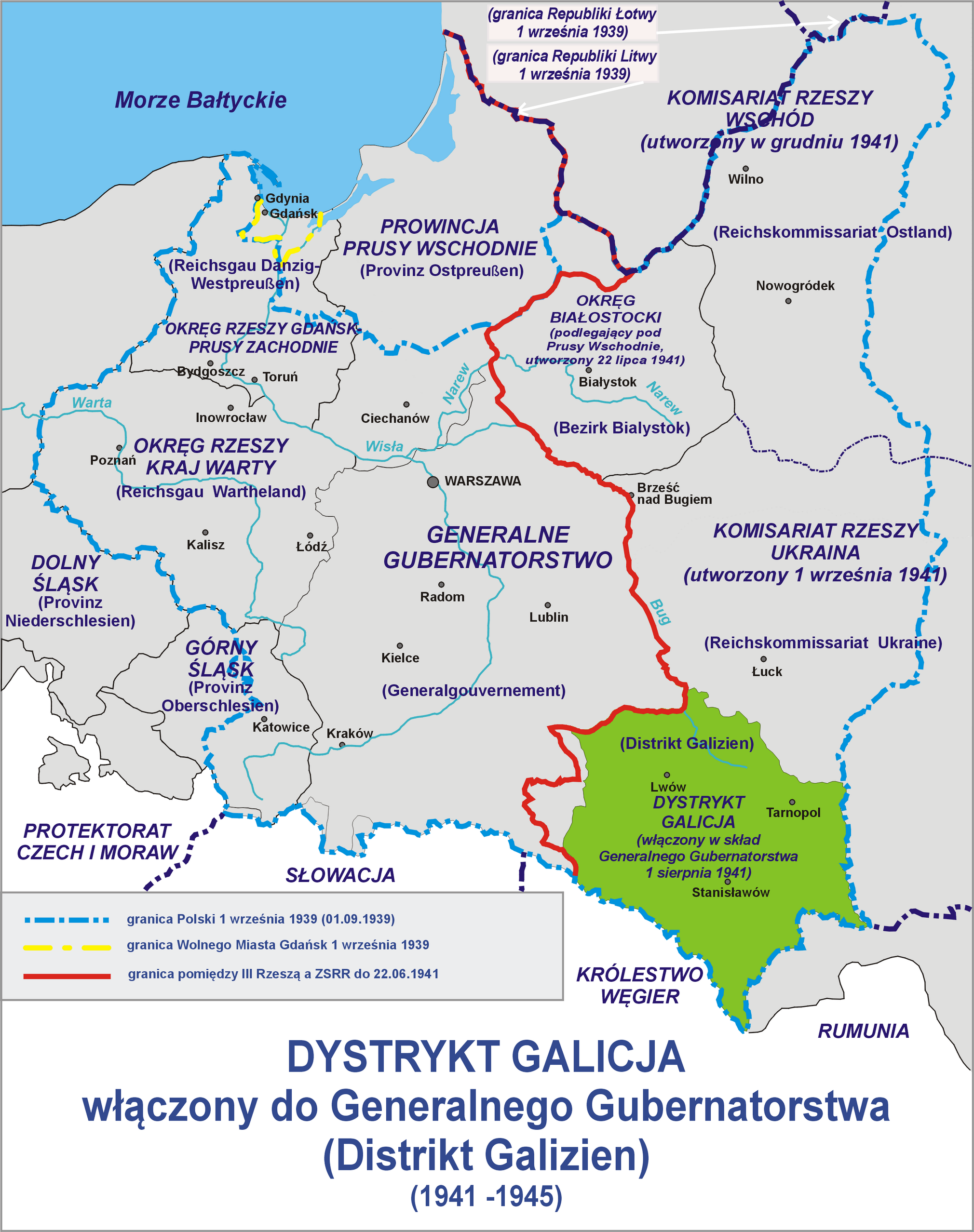
- The District of Galicia (green), from 1941–1944
- Capital: Lemberg
- Area
- 51,200 km^{2} (19,800 sq mi)
- Population
- 4,400,000
- Historical era: World War II
  - Established: 1941
  - Disestablished: 1944
Preceded by
| Lviv Oblast |
| Stanislav Oblast |
| Ternopil Oblast |
| General Government |
- Today part of: Ukraine

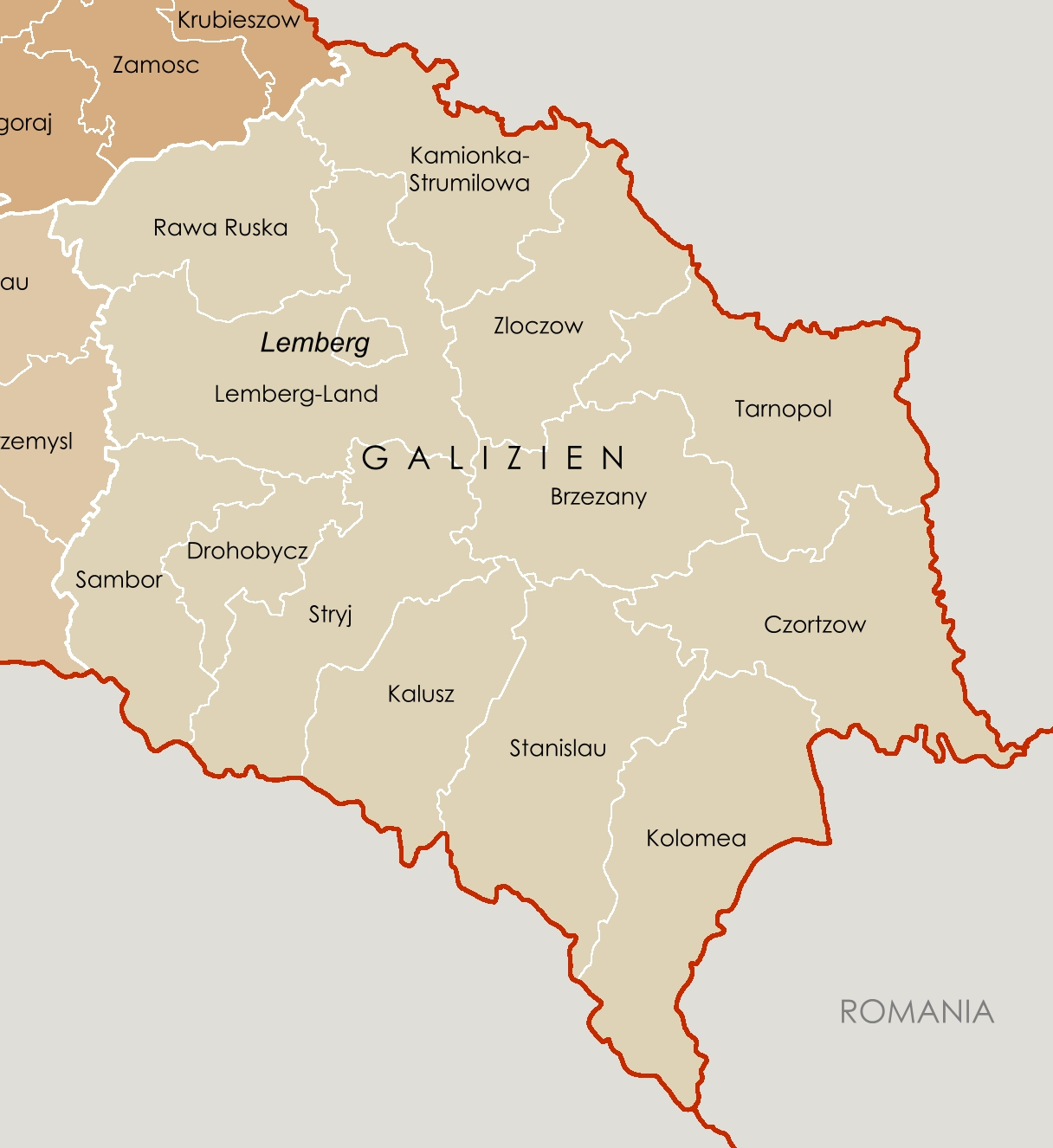
Administrative division of the district

The District of Galicia (German: Distrikt Galizien, Polish: Dystrykt Galicja, Ukrainian: Дистрикт Галичина) was a World War II administrative unit of the General Government created by Nazi Germany on 1 August 1941 after the start of Operation Barbarossa, based loosely within the borders of the ancient Principality of Galicia and the more recent Kingdom of Galicia and Lodomeria. Initially, during the invasion of Poland by Germany and the Soviet Union, the territory temporarily fell under Soviet occupation in 1939 as part of Soviet Ukraine.

Adolf Hitler formed a capital in Lemberg (Lviv) (Document No. 1997-PS of 17 July 1941), and the district existed from 1941 until 1944. It ceased to exist after the Soviet counter-offensive.

== History ==
The District of Galicia comprised mainly the pre-war Lwów, Tarnopol, and Stanisławów voivodeships of the Second Polish Republic, which are today part of western Ukraine. The territory was taken over by Nazi Germany in 1941 after the attack on the USSR and incorporated into the General Government, which had been governed by Gauleiter Hans Frank since the 1939 invasion of Poland. The region was retaken by the Soviet Union in 1944.

The district area was managed by Frank's brother-in-law Karl Lasch (de, pl) from 1 August 1941 to 6 January 1942, and by SS Brigadeführer Dr. Otto Wächter from 6 January 1942 to September 1943. Wächter utilised the district capital Lemberg (pl: Lwów, ukr: Lviv) as a recruitment base for the 14th Waffen Grenadier Division of the SS Galicia (1st Ukrainian). In the course of the Holocaust in occupied Poland starting from the year of the invasion, the largest Jewish extermination ghettos were created in Lwów (Lemberg),in Stanisławów (Stanislau),Tarnopol,Sambor ,Drohobycz and in Borshchiv

On the territory of Galicia during the German occupation of 1941–1944, publications on labour in Germany were published. German propaganda policy of the time encouraged Galician workers to work in Germany and the way the policy was changed over the time.

== Governors ==
| No. | Portrait | Governor | Took office | Left office | Time in office |
|---|---|---|---|---|---|
| 1 | Karl Lasch [de] | Karl Lasch (1904–1942) | 1 August 1941 | 6 January 1942 | 5 months |
| 2 | Otto Wächter | Otto Wächter (1901–1949) | 22 January 1942 | August 1944 | 2 years, 6 months |

== See also ==
- Subdivisions of Polish territories during World War II
- Soviet annexation of Eastern Galicia and Volhynia
