= Zichenau (region) =

Nazi-era administrative region attached to East Prussia

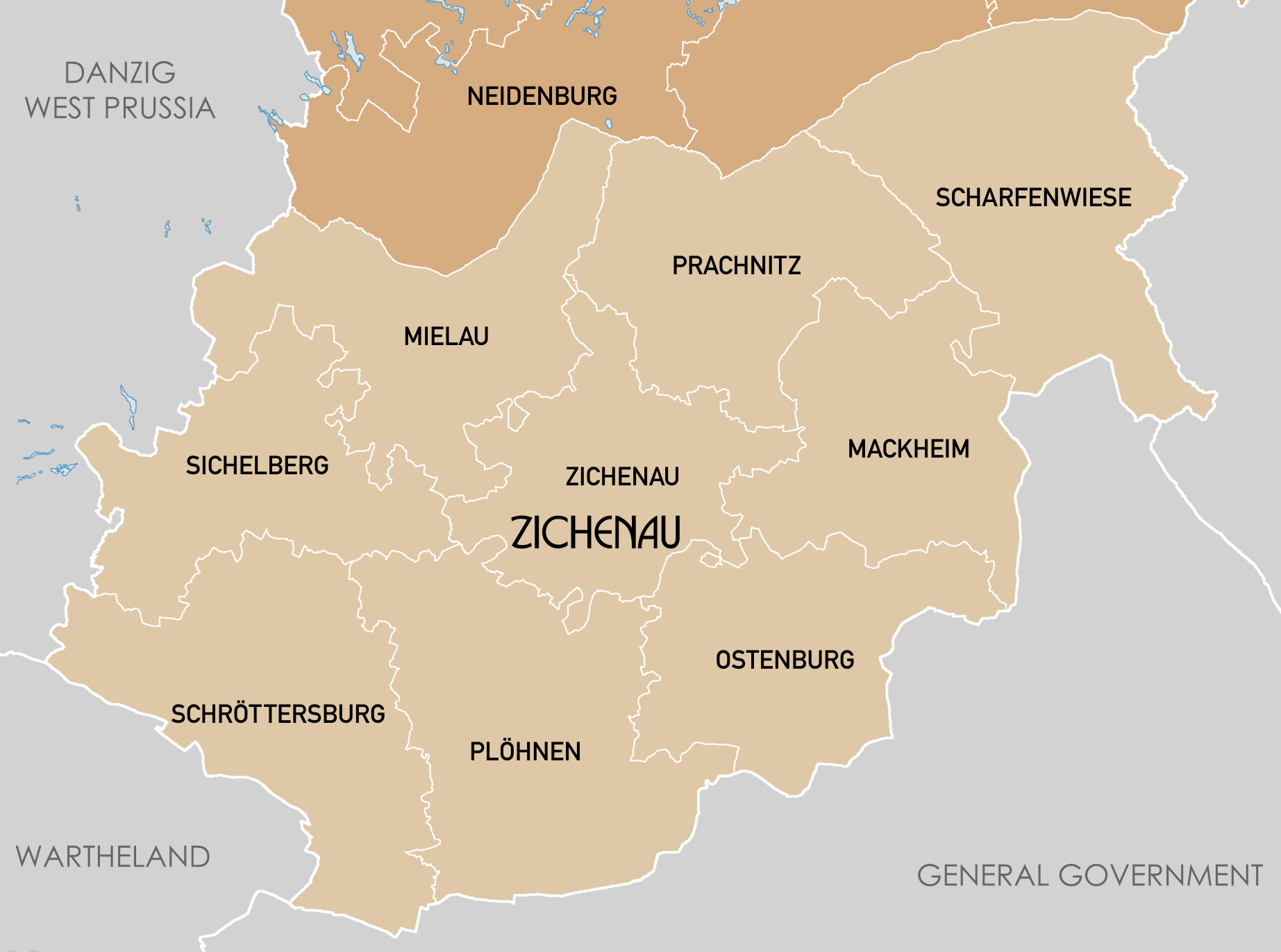
Map of the region in 1944

Regierungsbezirk Zichenau was a Regierungsbezirk, or administrative region, of the Nazi German Province of East Prussia in 1939–45, established in German-occupied Polish territory during World War II. The regional capital was Zichenau (Ciechanów). It was also referred to under the designation of South East Prussia (German: Südostpreußen) which, however, was later sometimes also applied to Bialystok District, although the latter was not incorporated into, but merely attached to East Prussia.

== History ==
The government region was created on 26 October 1939, out of Polish areas annexed by Nazi Germany during World War II. The region had an area of 12,000 km^{2} and a population of approximately 895,000, including 800,000 Poles, 80,000 Jews, and 15,000 Germans.

The Polish population was subjected to various crimes, including mass arrests, roundups, deportations to forced labour and concentration camps (including teenagers), executions, massacres (also as part of the Intelligenzaktion and Aktion T4) and expulsions. The Germans operated jails and prisons in Ciechanów, Mława, Ostrołęka, Płock, Płońsk, Przasnysz, Pułtusk, Sierpc. The Germans closed Polish associations, institutions, cooperatives and press. Polish libraries, museums, archives and industrial infrastructure were either looted or destroyed. With German labor offices recruiting forced laborers established in the cities of Ciechanów, Ostrołęka and Płock, Poles from Regierungsbezirk Zichenau formed the majority of Polish forced laborers in the province of East Prussia.

Regierungsbezirk Zichenau was dissolved in 1945 when East Prussia was overrun by the Soviet Red Army. The territory was then restored to Poland.

== Rural districts ==
1. Mackeim district (Maków Mazowiecki)
2. Mielau district (Mława)
3. Ostenburg district (Pułtusk)
4. Plöhnen district (Płońsk)
5. Praschnitz district (Przasnysz)
6. Scharfenwiese district (Ostrołęka)
7. Schröttersburg district (Płock)
8. Sichelberg district (Sierpc)
9. Zichenau district (Ciechanów)

== Bibliography ==
- Wardzyńska, Maria (2009). Był rok 1939. Operacja niemieckiej policji bezpieczeństwa w Polsce. Intelligenzaktion (in Polish). Warszawa: IPN.
- Wardzyńska, Maria (2017). Wysiedlenia ludności polskiej z okupowanych ziem polskich włączonych do III Rzeszy w latach 1939-1945 (in Polish). Warszawa: IPN. ISBN 978-83-8098-174-4.
