= List of German Nobel laureates =

From the Nobel Prize's establishment in 1901 until 1956, Germany had the highest number of Nobel laureates in the world. Today, Germany is the nation with the 3rd most Nobel Prize winners: 2nd most in the category of physics, 3rd most in chemistry and physiology or medicine, and 4th most in literature. Overall, there are 112 German Nobel Prize laureates.

== Nobel Peace Prize ==
Year	Laureate	Born	Died	Country of residence (Note: Country of residence or academic affiliation at the time the Nobel Prize was awarded. In some cases, German Nobel laureates were living outside Germany; for example, Herbert Kroemer and Gerd Binnig worked abroad while retaining German citizenship, whereas Henry Kissinger had already lost his German citizenship.)	Citation	Ref.
1926	Gustav Stresemann	10 May 1878 in Berlin, German Reich	3 October 1929 in Berlin, German Reich	Germany	"For their crucial role in bringing about the Locarno Treaty."	
1927	Ludwig Quidde	23 March 1858 in Bremen, Free City of Bremen	4 March 1941 in Geneva, Swiss Confederation	Germany	"For their contribution to the emergence in France and Germany of a public opinion which favours peaceful international cooperation."	
1935	Carl von Ossietzky	3 October 1889 in Hamburg, German Reich	4 May 1938 in Berlin, German Reich	Germany	"For his burning love for freedom of thought and expression and his valuable contribution to the cause of peace."	
1952	Albert Schweitzer	14 January 1875 in Kaisersberg, German Reich	4 September 1965 in Lambaréné, Gabonese Republic	France	"For his altruism, reverence for life, and tireless humanitarian work which has helped making the idea of brotherhood between men and nations a living one."	
1971	Willy Brandt	18 December 1913 in Lübeck, German Reich	8 October 1992 in Unkel, Federal Republic of Germany	West Germany	"For paving the way for a meaningful dialogue between East and West."	
1973	Henry Kissinger	27 May 1923 in Fürth, German Reich	29 November 2023 in Kent, Connecticut, USA	United States	"For jointly having negotiated a cease fire in Vietnam in 1973."	

== Nobel Prize in Literature ==
Year	Laureate	Born	Died	Country of residence	Citation	Ref.
1902	Theodor Mommsen	30 November 1817 in Garding, Duchy of Schleswig	1 November 1903 in Charlottenburg, German Reich	Germany	"The greatest living master of the art of historical writing, with special reference to his monumental work, A history of Rome."	
1908	Rudolf Eucken	5 January 1846 in Aurich, Kingdom of Hanover	14 September 1926 in Jena, German Reich	Germany	"In recognition of his earnest search for truth, his penetrating power of thought, his wide range of vision, and the warmth and strength in presentation with which in his numerous works he has vindicated and developed an idealistic philosophy of life."	
1910	Paul Heyse	15 March 1830 in Berlin, Kingdom of Prussia	2 April 1914 in Munich, German Reich	Germany	"As a tribute to the consummate artistry, permeated with idealism, which he has demonstrated during his long productive career as a lyric poet, dramatist, novelist and writer of world-renowned short stories."	
1912	Gerhart Hauptmann	15 November 1862 in Bad Salzbrunn, Kingdom of Prussia	6 June 1946 in Agnetendorf, Republic of Poland	Germany	"Primarily in recognition of his fruitful, varied and outstanding production in the realm of dramatic art."	
1929	Thomas Mann	6 June 1875 in Lübeck, German Reich	12 August 1955 in Zurich, Swiss Confederation	Germany	"Principally for his great novel, Buddenbrooks, which has won steadily increased recognition as one of the classic works of contemporary literature."	
1946	Hermann Hesse	2 July 1877 in Calw, German Reich	9 August 1962 in Montagnola, Swiss Confederation	Switzerland	"For his inspired writings which, while growing in boldness and penetration, exemplify the classical humanitarian ideals and high qualities of style."	
1966	Nelly Sachs	10 December 1891 in Berlin, German Reich	12 May 1970 in Stockholm, Kingdom of Sweden	Sweden	"For her outstanding lyrical and dramatic writing, which interprets Israel's destiny with touching strength."	
1972	Heinrich Böll	21 December 1917 in Cologne, German Reich	16 July 1985 in Kreuzau, Federal Republic of Germany	West Germany	"For his writing which through its combination of a broad perspective on his time and a sensitive skill in characterization has contributed to a renewal of German literature."	
1999	Günter Grass	16 October 1927 in Danzig, Free City of Danzig	13 April 2015 in Lübeck, Federal Republic of Germany	Germany	"Whose frolicsome black fables portray the forgotten face of history."	
2009	Herta Müller	17 August 1953 in Nitzkydorf, Romanian People's Republic	—	Germany	"Who, with the concentration of poetry and the frankness of prose, depicts the landscape of the dispossessed."	

== Nobel Prize in Chemistry ==
Year	Laureate	Born	Died	Country of academic affiliation	Citation	Ref.
1902	Emil Fischer	9 October 1852 in Euskirchen, Kingdom of Prussia	15 July 1919 in Berlin, German Reich	Germany	"In recognition of the extraordinary services he has rendered by his work on sugar and purine syntheses."	
1905	Adolf von Baeyer	31 October 1835 in Berlin, Kingdom of Prussia	20 August 1917 in Starnberg, German Reich	Germany	"In recognition of his services in the advancement of organic chemistry and the chemical industry, through his work on organic dyes and hydroaromatic compounds."	
1907	Eduard Buchner	20 May 1860 in Munich, Kingdom of Bavaria	13 August 1917 in Focșani, Kingdom of Romania	Germany	"For his biochemical researches and his discovery of cell-free fermentation."	
1909	Wilhelm Ostwald	2 September 1853 in Riga, Russian Empire	4 April 1932 in Leipzig, German Reich	Germany	"In recognition of his work on catalysis and for his investigations into the fundamental principles governing chemical equilibria and rates of reaction."	
1910	Otto Wallach	27 March 1847 in Königsberg, Kingdom of Prussia	26 February 1931 in Göttingen, German Reich	Germany	"In recognition of his services to organic chemistry and the chemical industry by his pioneer work in the field of alicyclic compounds."	
1915	Richard Willstätter	13 August 1872 in Karlsruhe, German Reich	3 August 1942 in Locarno, Swiss Confederation	Germany	"For his researches on plant pigments, especially chlorophyll."	
1918	Fritz Haber	9 December 1868 in Breslau, Kingdom of Prussia	29 January 1934 in Basel, Swiss Confederation	Germany	"For the synthesis of ammonia from its elements."	
1920	Walther Nernst	25 June 1864 in Briesen, Kingdom of Prussia	18 November 1941 in Zibelle, German Reich	Germany	"In recognition of his work in thermochemistry."	
1927	Heinrich Wieland	4 June 1877 in Pforzheim, German Reich	5 August 1957 in Munich, Federal Republic of Germany	Germany	"For his investigations of the constitution of the bile acids and related substances."	
1928	Adolf Windaus	25 December 1876 in Berlin, German Reich	9 June 1959 in Göttingen, Federal Republic of Germany	Germany	"For the services rendered through his research into the constitution of the sterols and their connection with the vitamins."	
1929	Hans von Euler-Chelpin	15 February 1873 in Augsburg, German Reich	6 November 1964 in Stockholm, Kingdom of Sweden	Sweden	"For their investigations on the fermentation of sugar and fermentative enzymes."	
1930	Hans Fischer	27 July 1881 in Höchst, German Reich	31 March 1945 in Munich, Greater German Reich	Germany	"For his researches into the constitution of haemin and chlorophyll and especially for his synthesis of haemin."	
1931	Friedrich Bergius	11 October 1884 in Breslau, German Reich	30 March 1949 in Buenos Aires, Argentine Republic	Germany	"In recognition of their contributions to the invention and development of chemical high pressure methods."	
1931	Carl Bosch	27 August 1874 in Cologne, German Reich	26 April 1940 in Heidelberg, German Reich	Germany	"In recognition of their contributions to the invention and development of chemical high pressure methods."	
1938	Richard Kuhn	3 December 1900 in Vienna, Austro-Hungarian Monarchy	31 July 1967 in Heidelberg, Federal Republic of Germany	Germany	"For his work on carotenoids and vitamins."	
1939	Adolf Butenandt	24 March 1903 in Lehe, German Reich	18 January 1995 in Munich, Federal Republic of Germany	Germany	"For his work on sex hormones."	
1944	Otto Hahn	8 March 1879 in Frankfurt, German Reich	28 July 1968 in Göttingen, Federal Republic of Germany	Germany	"For his discovery of the fission of heavy nuclei."	
1950	Kurt Alder	10 July 1902 in Königshütte, German Reich	20 June 1958 in Cologne, Federal Republic of Germany	West Germany	"For their discovery and development of the diene synthesis."	
1950	Otto Diels	23 January 1876 in Hamburg, German Reich	7 March 1954 in Kiel, Federal Republic of Germany	West Germany	"For their discovery and development of the diene synthesis."	
1953	Hermann Staudinger	23 March 1881 in Worms, German Reich	8 September 1965 in Freiburg, Federal Republic of Germany	West Germany	"For his discoveries in the field of macromolecular chemistry."	
1963	Karl Ziegler	26 November 1898 in Helsa, German Reich	12 August 1973 in Mülheim, Federal Republic of Germany	West Germany	"For their discoveries in the field of the chemistry and technology of high polymers."	
1967	Manfred Eigen	9 May 1927 in Bochum, German Reich	6 February 2019 in Göttingen, Federal Republic of Germany	West Germany	"For their studies of extremely fast chemical reactions, effected [sic] by disturbing the equilibrium by means of very short pulses of energy."	
1971	Gerhard Herzberg	25 December 1904 in Hamburg, German Reich	3 March 1999 in Ottawa, Canada	Canada	"For his contributions to the knowledge of electronic structure and geometry of molecules, particularly free radicals."	
1973	Ernst Otto Fischer	10 November 1918 in Munich, German Reich	23 July 2007 in Munich, Federal Republic of Germany	West Germany	"For their pioneering work, performed independently, on the chemistry of the organometallic, so called sandwich compounds."	
1979	Georg Wittig	16 June 1897 in Berlin, German Reich	26 August 1987 in Heidelberg, Federal Republic of Germany	West Germany	"For their development of the use of boron- and phosphorus-containing compounds, respectively, into important reagents in organic synthesis."	
1988	Johann Deisenhofer	30 September 1943 in Zusamaltheim, Greater German Reich	—	United States	"For the determination of the three-dimensional structure of a photosynthetic reaction centre."	
1988	Robert Huber	20 February 1937 in Munich, German Reich	—	West Germany	"For the determination of the three-dimensional structure of a photosynthetic reaction centre."	
1988	Hartmut Michel	18 July 1948 in Ludwigsburg, Occupation of Germany	—	West Germany	"For the determination of the three-dimensional structure of a photosynthetic reaction centre."	
2007	Gerhard Ertl	10 October 1936 in Bad Cannstatt, German Reich	—	Germany	For his studies of chemical processes on solid surfaces."	
2014	Stefan W. Hell	23 December 1962 in Arad, Romanian People's Republic	—	Germany	"For the development of super-resolved fluorescence microscopy."	
2017	Joachim Frank	12 September 1940 in Siegen, German Reich	—	United States	"For developing cryo-electron microscopy for the high-resolution structure determination of biomolecules in solution."	
2021	Benjamin List	11 January 1968 in Frankfurt, Federal Republic of Germany	—	Germany	"For the development of asymmetric organocatalysis."	

== Nobel Prize in Physics ==
Year	Laureate	Born	Died	Country of academic affiliation	Citation	Ref.
1901	Wilhelm Conrad Röntgen	27 March 1845 in Lennep, Kingdom of Prussia	10 February 1923 in Munich, German Reich	Germany	"In recognition of the extraordinary services he has rendered by the discovery of the remarkable rays subsequently named after him."	
1905	Philipp Lenard	7 June 1862 in Pozsony, Kingdom of Hungary	20 May 1947 in Messelhausen, Occupation of Germany	Germany	"For his work on cathode rays."	
1909	Ferdinand Braun	6 June 1850 in Fulda, Electorate of Hesse	20 April 1918 in Brooklyn, USA	Germany	"In recognition of their contributions to the development of wireless telegraphy."	
1911	Wilhelm Wien	13 January 1864 in Gaffken, Kingdom of Prussia	30 August 1928 in Munich, German Reich	Germany	"For his discoveries regarding the laws governing the radiation of heat."	
1914	Max von Laue	9 October 1879 in Pfaffendorf, German Reich	23 April 1960 in West Berlin, Federal Republic of Germany	Germany	"For his discovery of the diffraction of X-rays by crystals."	
1918	Max Planck	23 April 1858 in Kiel, Duchy of Holstein	4 October 1947 in Göttingen, Occupation of Germany	Germany	"In recognition of the services he rendered to the advancement of Physics by his discovery of energy quanta."	
1919	Johannes Stark	15 April 1874 in Schickenhof, German Reich	21 June 1957 in Traunstein, Federal Republic of Germany	Germany	"For his discovery of the Doppler effect in canal rays and the splitting of spectral lines in electric fields."	
1921	Albert Einstein	14 March 1879 in Ulm, German Reich	18 April 1955 in Princeton, New Jersey, USA	Germany	"For his services to Theoretical Physics, and especially for his discovery of the law of the photoelectric effect."	
1925	James Franck	26 August 1882 in Hamburg, German Reich	21 May 1964 in Göttingen, Federal Republic of Germany	Germany	"For their discovery of the laws governing the impact of an electron upon an atom."	
1925	Gustav Hertz	22 July 1887 in Hamburg, German Reich	30 October 1975 in East Berlin, German Democratic Republic	Germany	"For their discovery of the laws governing the impact of an electron upon an atom."	
1932	Werner Heisenberg	5 December 1901 in Würzburg, German Reich	1 February 1976 in Munich, Federal Republic of Germany	Germany	"For the creation of quantum mechanics, the application of which has, inter alia, led to the discovery of the allotropic forms of hydrogen."	
1943	Otto Stern	17 February 1888 in Sorau, German Reich	17 August 1969 in Berkeley, California, USA	United States	"For his contribution to the development of the molecular ray method and his discovery of the magnetic moment of the proton."	
1954	Max Born	11 December 1882 in Breslau, German Reich	5 January 1970 in Göttingen, Federal Republic of Germany	United Kingdom	"For his fundamental research in quantum mechanics, especially for his statistical interpretation of the wavefunction."	
1954	Walther Bothe	8 January 1891 in Oranienburg, German Reich	8 February 1957 in Heidelberg, Federal Republic of Germany	West Germany	"For the coincidence method and his discoveries made therewith."	
1955	Polykarp Kusch	26 January 1911 in Blankenburg, German Reich	20 March 1993 in Dallas, USA	United States	"For his precision determination of the magnetic moment of the electron."	
1961	Rudolf Mössbauer	31 January 1929 in Munich, German Reich	14 September 2011	West Germany, United States	"For his researches concerning the resonance absorption of gamma radiation and his discovery in this connection of the effect which bears his name."	
1963	J. Hans D. Jensen	25 June 1907 in Hamburg, German Reich	11 February 1973 in Heidelberg, Federal Republic of Germany	West Germany	"For their discoveries concerning nuclear shell structure."	
1963	Maria Goeppert Mayer	28 June 1906 in Kattowitz, German Reich	20 February 1972; San Diego, USA	United States	"For their discoveries concerning nuclear shell structure."	
1966	Alfred Kastler	3 May 1902 in Gebweiler, German Reich	7 January 1984 in Bandol, French Republic	France	"For the discovery and development of optical methods for studying Hertzian resonances in atoms."	
1967	Hans Bethe	2 July 1906 in Strassburg, German Reich	6 March 2005 in Ithaca, New York, USA	United States	"For his contributions to the theory of nuclear reactions, especially his discoveries concerning the energy production in stars."	
1978	Arno Penzias	26 April 1933 in Munich, German Reich	22 January 2024 in San Francisco, California, USA	United States	"For their discovery of cosmic microwave background radiation."	
1985	Klaus von Klitzing	28 June 1943 in Schroda, Greater German Reich	—	West Germany	"For the discovery of the quantized Hall effect."	
1986	Gerd Binnig	20 July 1947 in Frankfurt, Occupation of Germany	—	Switzerland	"For their design of the scanning tunneling microscope."	
1986	Ernst Ruska	25 December 1906 in Heidelberg, German Reich	27 May 1988 in West Berlin, Federal Republic of Germany	West Germany	"For his fundamental work in electron optics, and for the design of the first electron microscope."	
1987	J. Georg Bednorz	16 May 1950 in Neuenkirchen, Federal Republic of Germany	—	Switzerland	"For their important break-through in the discovery of superconductivity in ceramic materials."	
1989	Hans G. Dehmelt	9 September 1922 in Görlitz, German Reich	7 March 2017 in Seattle, USA	United States	"For the development of the ion trap technique."	
1989	Wolfgang Paul	10 August 1913 in Lorenzkirch, German Reich	7 December 1993 in Bonn, Federal Republic of Germany	West Germany	"For the development of the ion trap technique."	
1998	Horst L. Störmer	6 April 1949 in Frankfurt, Occupation of Germany	—	United States	"For their discovery of a new form of quantum fluid with fractionally charged excitations."	
2000	Herbert Kroemer	25 August 1928 in Weimar, German Reich	8 March 2024	United States	"For developing semiconductor heterostructures used in high-speed- and opto-electronics."	
2001	Wolfgang Ketterle	21 October 1957 in Heidelberg, Federal Republic of Germany	—	United States	"For the achievement of Bose-Einstein condensation in dilute gases of alkali atoms, and for early fundamental studies of the properties of the condensates."	
2005	Theodor W. Hänsch	30 October 1941 in Heidelberg, German Reich	—	Germany	"For their contributions to the development of laser-based precision spectroscopy, including the optical frequency comb technique."	
2007	Peter Grünberg	18 May 1939 in Plzeň, Protectorate of Bohemia and Moravia	9 April 2018 in Jülich, Federal Republic of Germany	Germany	"For the discovery of Giant Magnetoresistance."	
2017	Rainer Weiss	29 September 1932 in Berlin, German Reich	25 August 2025 in Cambridge, Massachusetts, USA	United States	"For decisive contributions to the LIGO detector and the observation of gravitational waves."	
2020	Reinhard Genzel	24 March 1952 in Bad Homburg, Federal Republic of Germany	—	Germany, United States	"For the discovery of a supermassive compact object at the centre of our galaxy."	
2021	Klaus Hasselmann	25 October 1931 in Hamburg, German Reich	—	Germany	"For the physical modelling of Earth’s climate, quantifying variability and reliably predicting global warming."	

== Nobel Prize in Physiology or Medicine ==
Year	Laureate	Born	Died	Country of academic affiliation	Citation	Ref.
1901	Emil von Behring	15 March 1854 in Hansdorf, Kingdom of Prussia	31 March 1917 in Marburg, German Reich	Germany	"For his work on serum therapy, especially its application against diphtheria, by which he has opened a new road in the domain of medical science and thereby placed in the hands of the physician a victorious weapon against illness and deaths."	
1905	Robert Koch	11 December 1843 in Clausthal, Kingdom of Hanover	27 May 1910 in Baden-Baden, German Reich	Germany	"For his investigations and discoveries in relation to tuberculosis."	
1908	Paul Ehrlich	14 March 1854 in Strehlen, Kingdom of Prussia	20 August 1915 in Bad Homburg, German Reich	Germany	"In recognition of their work on immunity."	
1910	Albrecht Kossel	16 September 1853 in Rostock, Grand Duchy of Mecklenburg-Schwerin	5 July 1927 in Heidelberg, German Reich	Germany	"In recognition of the contributions to our knowledge of cell chemistry made through his work on proteins, including the nucleic substances."	
1922	Otto Meyerhof	12 April 1884 in Hanover, German Reich	6 October 1951 in Philadelphia, USA	Germany	"For his discovery of the fixed relationship between the consumption of oxygen and the metabolism of lactic acid in the muscle."	
1931	Otto Warburg	8 October 1883 in Freiburg, German Reich	1 August 1970 in West Berlin, Federal Republic of Germany	Germany	"For his discovery of the nature and mode of action of the respiratory enzyme."	
1935	Hans Spemann	27 June 1869 in Stuttgart, Kingdom of Württemberg	12 September 1941 in Freiburg, German Reich	Germany	"For his discovery of the organizer effect in embryonic development."	
1936	Otto Loewi	3 June 1873 in Frankfurt, German Reich	25 December 1961 in New York City, USA	Austria	"For their discoveries relating to chemical transmission of nerve impulses."	
1939	Gerhard Domagk	30 October 1895 in Lagow, German Reich	24 April 1964 in Burgberg, Federal Republic of Germany	Germany	"For the discovery of the antibacterial effects of prontosil."	
1945	Ernst B. Chain	19 June 1906 in Berlin, German Reich	12 August 1979 in Mulranny, Ireland	United Kingdom	"For the discovery of penicillin and its curative effect in various infectious diseases."	
1953	Hans Krebs	25 August 1900 in Hildesheim, German Reich	22 November 1981 in Oxford, United Kingdom of Great Britain and Northern Ireland	United Kingdom	"For his discovery of the citric acid cycle."	
1953	Fritz Lipmann	12 June 1899 in Königsberg, German Reich	24 July 1986 in Poughkeepsie, USA	United States	"For his discovery of co-enzyme A and its importance for intermediary metabolism."	
1964	Konrad Bloch	21 January 1912 in Neisse, German Reich	15 October 2000 in Burlington, Massachusetts, USA	United States	"For their discoveries concerning the mechanism and regulation of the cholesterol and fatty acid metabolism."	
1964	Feodor Lynen	6 April 1911 in Munich, German Reich	6 August 1979 in Munich, Federal Republic of Germany	West Germany	"For their discoveries concerning the mechanism and regulation of the cholesterol and fatty acid metabolism."	
1969	Max Delbrück	4 September 1906 in Berlin, German Reich	9 March 1981 in Pasadena, California, USA	United States	"For their discoveries concerning the replication mechanism and the genetic structure of viruses."	
1970	Bernard Katz	26 March 1911 in Leipzig, German Reich	20 April 2003 in London, United Kingdom of Great Britain and Northern Ireland	United Kingdom	"For their discoveries concerning the humoral transmitters in the nerve terminals and the mechanism for their storage, release and inactivation."	
1973	Karl von Frisch	20 November 1886 in Vienna, Austro-Hungarian Monarchy	12 June 1982 in Munich, Federal Republic of Germany	West Germany	"For their discoveries concerning organization and elicitation of individual and social behaviour patterns."	
1984	Georges J. F. Köhler	17 April 1946 in Munich, Occupation of Germany	1 March 1995 in Freiburg, Federal Republic of Germany	Switzerland	"For theories concerning the specificity in development and control of the immune system and the discovery of the principle for production of monoclonal antibodies."	
1991	Erwin Neher	20 March 1944 in Landsberg am Lech, Greater German Reich	—	Germany	"For their discoveries concerning the function of single ion channels in cells."	
1991	Bert Sakmann	12 June 1942 in Stuttgart, German Reich	—	Germany	"For their discoveries concerning the function of single ion channels in cells."	
1995	Christiane Nüsslein-Volhard	20 October 1942 in Magdeburg, German Reich	—	Germany	"For their discoveries concerning the genetic control of early embryonic development."	
1999	Günter Blobel	21 May 1936 in Waltersdorf, German Reich	18 February 2018 in New York City, USA	United States	"For the discovery that proteins have intrinsic signals that govern their transport and localization in the cell."	
2008	Harald zur Hausen	11 March 1936 in Gelsenkirchen, German Reich	28 May 2023 in Heidelberg, Federal Republic of Germany	Germany	"For his discovery of human papilloma viruses causing cervical cancer."	
2013	Thomas C. Südhof	22 December 1955 in Göttingen, Federal Republic of Germany	—	United States	"For their discoveries of machinery regulating vesicle traffic, a major transport system in our cells."	

== Sveriges Riksbank Prize in Economic Sciences in Memory of Alfred Nobel ==
Year	Laureate	Born	Died	Country of academic affiliation	Citation	Ref.
1994	Reinhard Selten	5 October 1930 in Breslau, German Reich	23 August 2016 in Poznań, Republic of Poland	Germany	"For their pioneering analysis of equilibria in the theory of non-cooperative games."	
