= Kreis Rosenberg in Westpreußen =

District of Prussia (1818–1945)

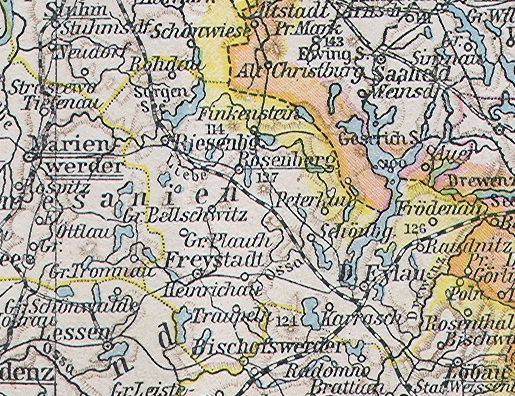
Kreis Rosenberg in Westpreußen

Province of West Prussia Regierungsbezirk Danzig Regierungsbezirk Marienwerder

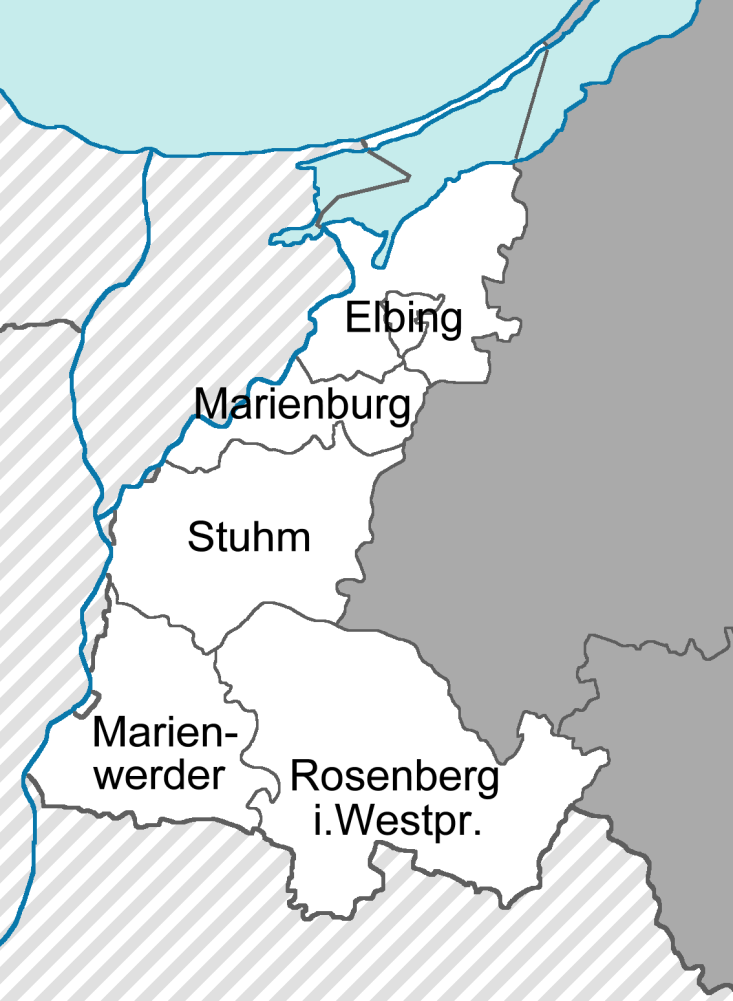
Location in Regierungsbezirk Westpreußen (1920-1939)

The district of Rosenberg in Westpreußen was a Prussian district that existed from 1818 to 1945. The territory of the district is now located within the Polish Warmian-Masurian Voivodeship.

== History ==
After the First Partition of Poland in 1772, the area of the future Rosenberg district was assigned to the newly created province of West Prussia as part of the Marienwerder district. As part of a comprehensive district reform in Regierungsbezirk Marienwerder, the new Rosenberg district with the capital at Rosenberg in Westpreußen was formed on 1 April 1818 from the eastern part of the Marienwerder district. The district included Bischofswerder, Deutsch Eylau, Freystadt, Riesenburg and Rosenberg.

From 3 December 1829 to 1 April 1878 West Prussia and East Prussia were united to form the Province of Prussia, which had belonged to the German Empire since 1871.

With the entry into force of the Treaty of Versailles on 10 January 1920, the establishment of the Polish Corridor on West Prussian territory and the associated dissolution of the Province of West Prussia, the district was temporarily subordinated to the Oberpräsident in Königsberg. In preparation for the referendum on 1 July 1920 about the future membership of the district, the district area was subordinated to the Inter-Allied Commission for Government and Referendum in Marienwerder until 16 August 1920. After the clear result of the referendum, the district remained with Germany. On 1 July 1922 the district became part of the province of East Prussia. Regierungsbezirk Marienwerder region was renamed Regierungsbezirk Westpreußen for reasons of tradition.

After the Invasion of Poland in 1939, the district of Rosenberg became part of the newly formed Reichsgau Danzig-West Prussia. In January 1945 the Red Army conquered the district and in March 1945 it was placed under the administration of the Polish People's Republic. In the following months, the German population was expelled.

== Demographics ==
Population of Rosenberg district
	1846		1849		1855		1858	
Germans	34,380	80.9%	34,867	83.3%	36,329	84.3%	38,166	85.6%
Poles	8,100	19.1%	6,985	16.7%	6,768	15.7%	6,441	14.4%
Total	42,480		41,852		43,097		44,607	

== Notable people ==
- Emil von Behring, the first person to win the Nobel Prize in Physiology or Medicine, was born on 15 March 1854 in Hansdorf.
- Paul von Hindenburg, President of Germany and Generalfeldmarschall, last resided in Neudeck and died there on 2 August 1934.
