= 1920 East Prussian plebiscite =

Referendum on whether to become part of Poland

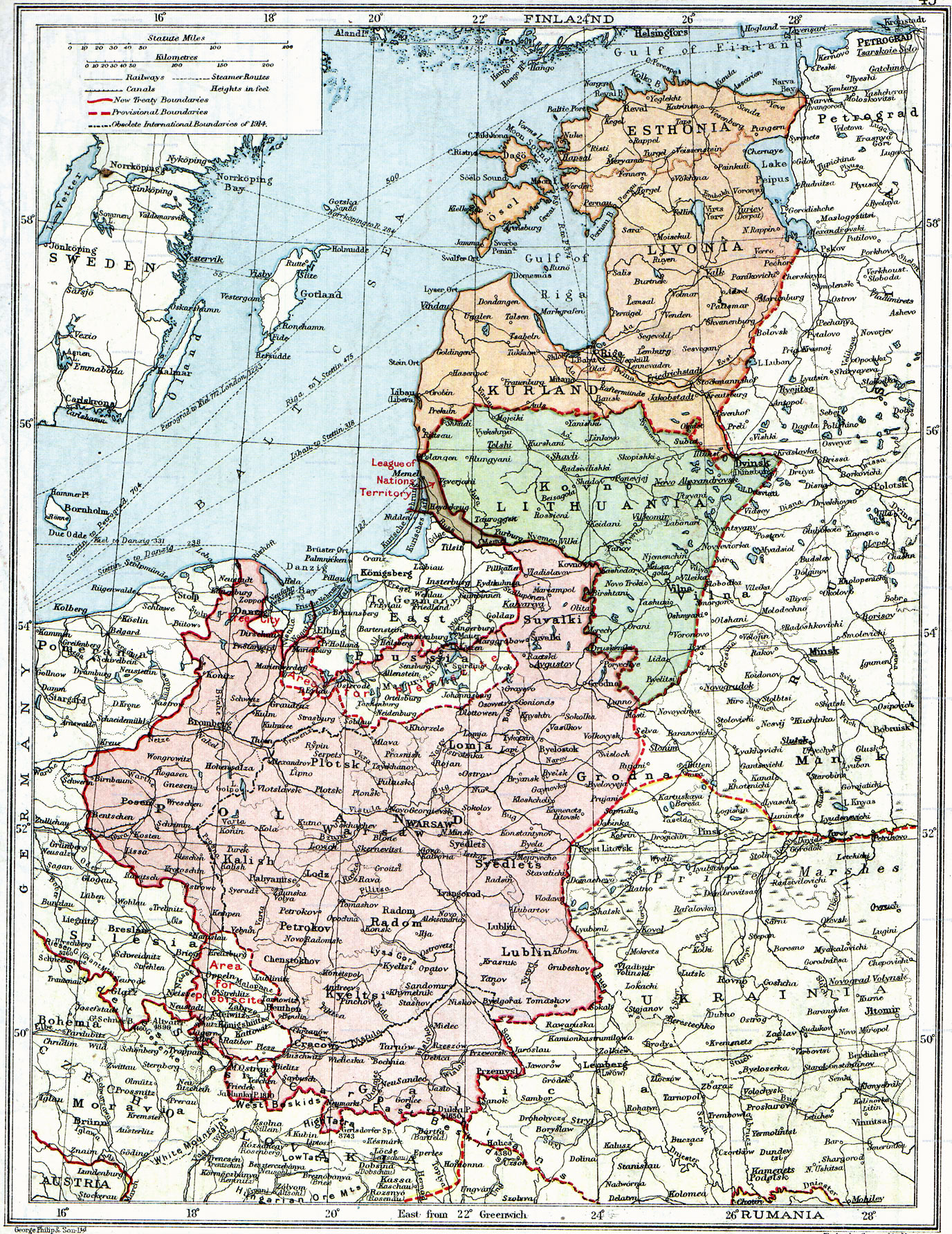
1920 map of Poland and the Baltic States showing the area of the East Prussian plebiscite.

The East Prussian plebiscite (German: Volksabstimmung in Ostpreußen), also known as the Allenstein and Marienwerder plebiscite or Warmia, Masuria and Powiśle plebiscite (Polish: Plebiscyt na Warmii, Mazurach i Powiślu), was a plebiscite for the self-determination of the regions of southern Warmia (Ermland), Masuria (Mazury, Masuren) and Powiśle, which had been in parts of the East Prussian Government Region of Allenstein and of the West Prussian Government Region of Marienwerder in accordance with Articles 94 to 97 of the Treaty of Versailles.

Prepared in early 1920, the plebiscite took place on 11 July 1920 and was conducted by German authorities under Inter-Allied control.

The plebiscite reported that most voters had selected East Prussia over Poland (over 97% in the Allenstein Plebiscite Area and 92% in the Marienwerder Plebiscite Area). As a result, most of the territories in question remained in the Free State of Prussia and therefore in Germany.

== Background ==
The area concerned had changed hands at various times over the centuries between the Old Prussians, the monastic state of the Teutonic Knights, the Duchy of Prussia, Germany and Poland. The area of Warmia had been part of the Kingdom of Prussia since the first Partition of Poland in 1772, and the region of Masuria was ruled by the German Hohenzollern family since the Prussian Tribute of 1525, as a Polish fief until 1660. Many inhabitants of that region had Polish roots and were influenced by Polish culture. The last official German census in 1910 classified them as ethnic Poles or Masurians.

During the German Empire, harsh Germanisation measures were enacted in the region. The Polish delegation at the Paris Peace Conference, led by Roman Dmowski, made a number of demands in relation to areas that had been part of the Polish–Lithuanian Commonwealth until 1772. Despite their protests, supported by the French, US President Woodrow Wilson and the other Allies agreed that plebiscites according to self-determination should be held.

In the former German Province of Posen and parts of West Prussia, an armed revolt had already removed the German authorities in 1919.

== Areas ==
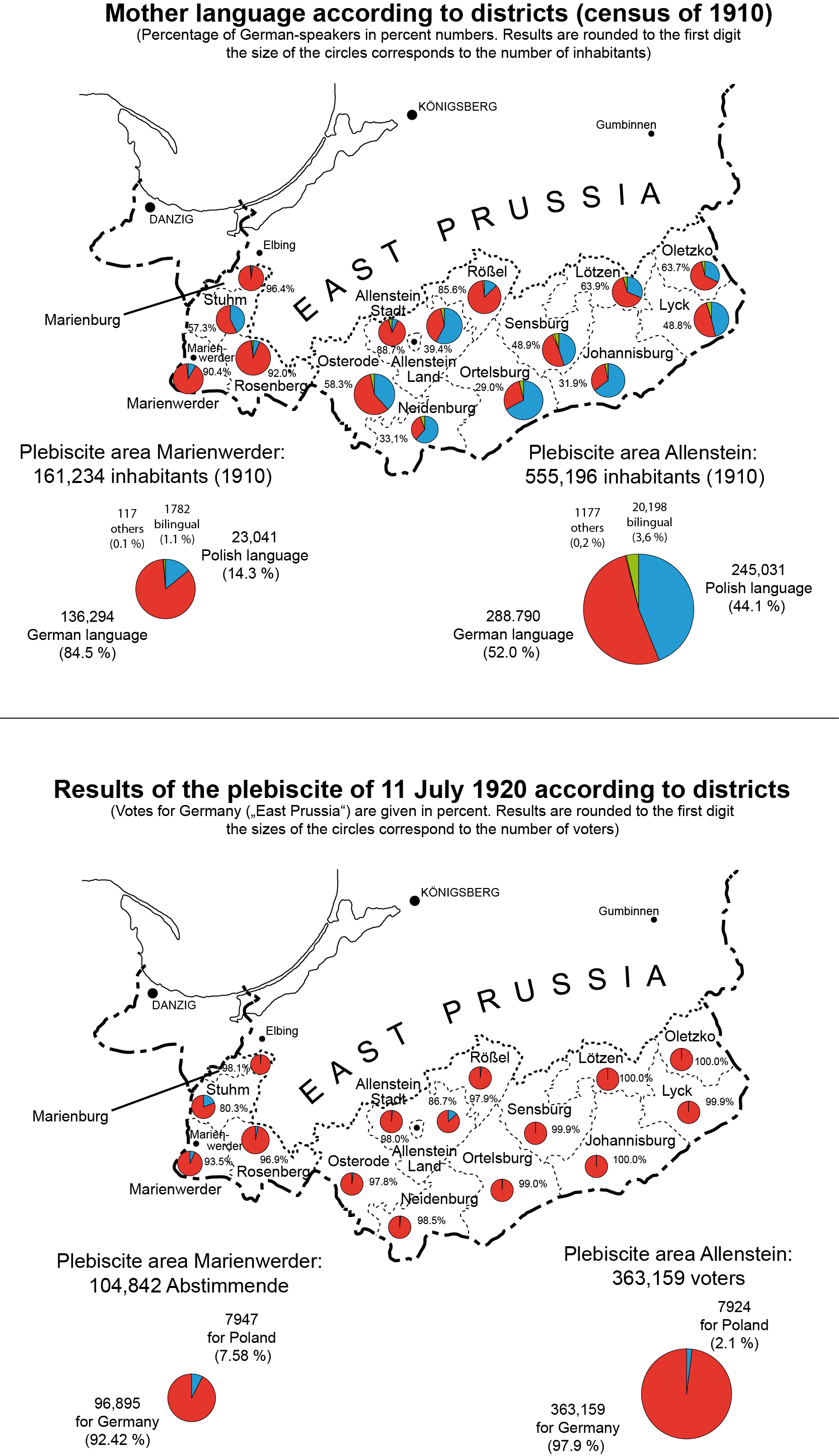
Upper map: language statistics according to the Prussian census of 1910, in the map Mazurian is comprehended in Polish, lower map: plebiscite results

The plebiscite areas (German: Abstimmungsgebiete; French: zones du plébiscite) were placed under the authority of two Inter-Allied Commissions of five members, who were appointed by the Principal Allied and Associated Powers representing the League of Nations. British and Italian troops, under the command of the Commissions, arrived on and soon after 12 February 1920 after the regular German Reichswehr had previously left the plebiscite areas. The civil and municipal administration was continued by the existing German authorities, which were responsible to the Commissions for their duration.

In accordance with Articles 94 to 97 of the Treaty of Versailles (section entitled "East Prussia"), the Marienwerder Plebiscite Area was formed of northeastern Marienwerder Government Region, based in Marienwerder in West Prussia, now Kwidzyn, which encompassed the districts of Marienwerder (east of the Vistula), Stuhm (based in Stuhm, now Sztum), Rosenberg (based in Rosenberg in West Prussia, now Susz) as well as parts of Marienburg in West Prussia (based in Marienburg in West Prussia, Malbork, part of the Danzig Government Region) east of the Nogat. The treaty defined the Allenstein Plebiscite Area as "The western and northern boundary of Allenstein Government Region to its junction with the boundary between the districts of Oletzko (based in Marggrabowa, now Olecko) and of Angerburg (based in Angerburg, now Węgorzewo). The northern boundary of the Oletzko District to its junction with the old frontier of East Prussia." Thus, the Allenstein precinct comprised all the Allenstein Region plus the Oletzko District (Gumbinnen Government Region).

According to Jerzy Minakowski, the area of the plebiscite had 720,000 people, who were German citizens, and he considered 440,000 of them as Polish by their Mazurian dialect of Polish. The official Prussian census of 1910 showed 245,000 Polish- and Mazurian-speakers and 289,000 German-speakers in the Allenstein Government Region and 23,000 and 136,000 in the Marienwerder Government Region.

=== Allenstein / Olsztyn Plebiscite Area ===
The Allied forces had to intervene here in 1919 to release imprisoned Masurians, who had tried to reach the Paris Conference. The president and British commissioner of the Inter-Allied Administrative and Plebiscite Commission for Allenstein was Ernest Rennie; the French commissioner was Couget; the Italian commissioner was Marquis Fracassi, a senator; and the Japanese commissioner was Marumo. The German government, under the Protocol's terms, was allowed to attach a delegate and sent Reichskommissar Wilhelm von Gayl, who had been in the service of the Interior Ministry before he was on the Inner Colonisation Committee. The local police forces were placed under the control of two British officers: Lieutenant-Colonel Bennet and Major David Deevis. Bennet reported that he regarded them as "well-disciplined and reliable". There was also a battalion from the Royal Irish Regiment and an Italian regiment stationed at Lyck (Ełk).

According to Jerzy Minakowski, the small forces had proven themselves inadequate to protect pro-Polish voters in the precincts from pro-German repressions.

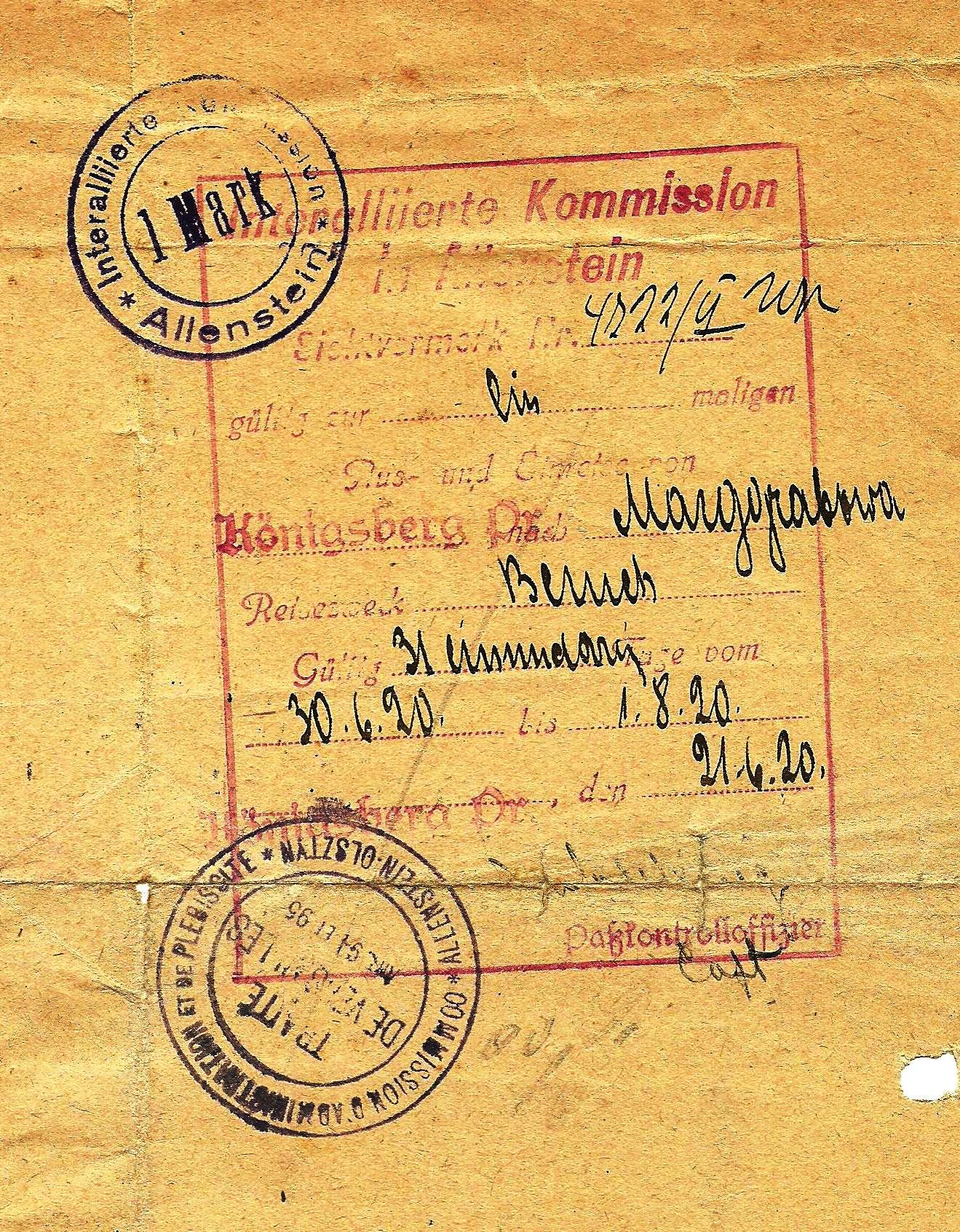
1920 Allied visa to exit Allenstein.

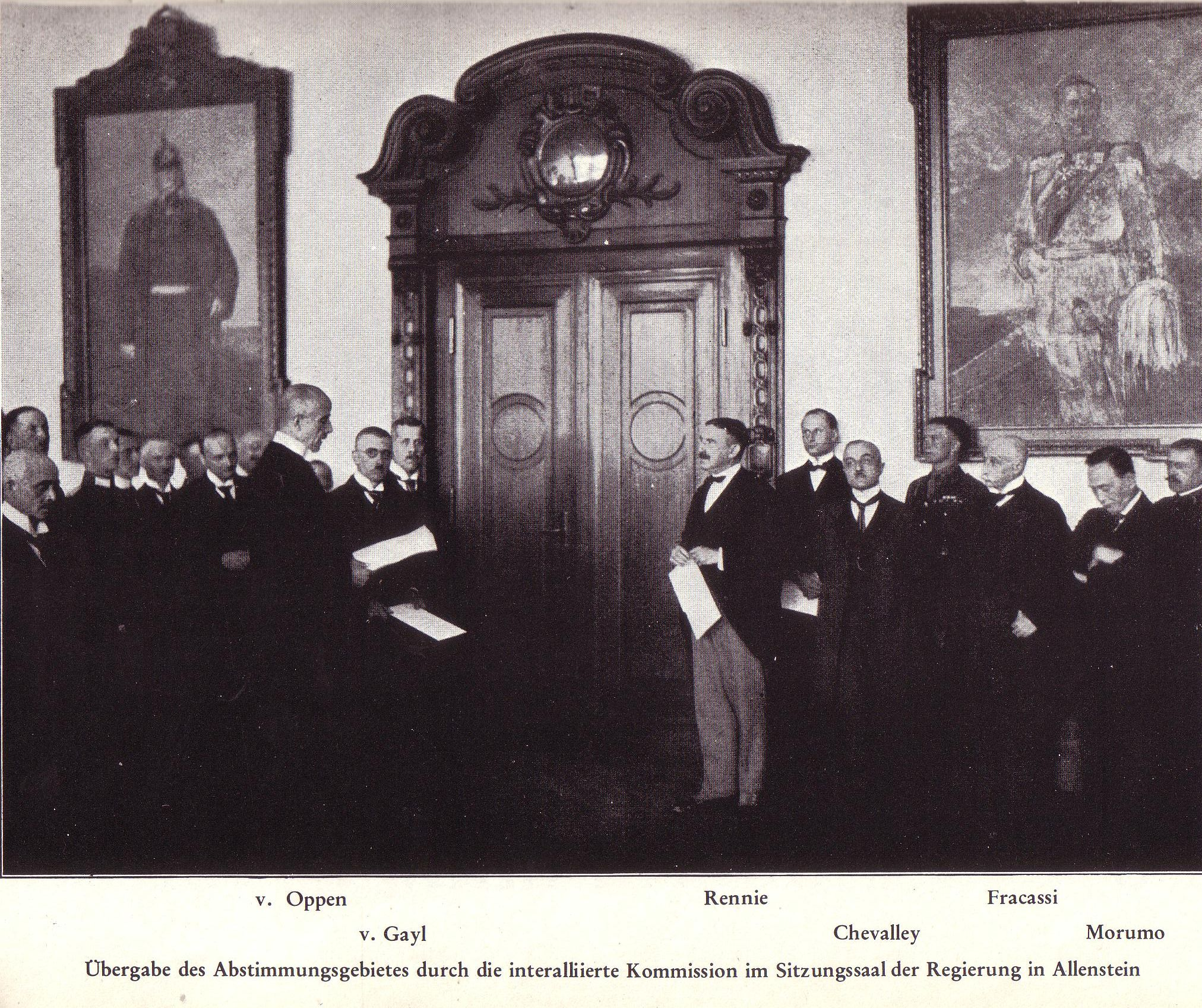
Handover of the plebiscite area by the Allied commission, Allenstein Regional Government House, 16 August 1920

The Commission had general powers of administration and was particularly "charged with the duty of arranging for the vote and of taking such measures as it may deem necessary to ensure its freedom, fairness, and secrecy. The Commission will have all necessary authority to decide any questions to which the execution of these provisions may give rise. The Commission will make such arrangements as may be necessary for assistance in the exercise of its functions by officials chosen by itself from the local population. Its decisions will be taken by a majority".

The Commission was welcomed by the Poles in the region, who hoped that its presence would improve their situation, but petitions were made to remove German officials and the Sicherheitswehr and demanded the official welcoming committee of German officials to show the representatives of the Allies the plight of ethnic Poles.

On 18 February 1919, the Allenstein-based commission decreed that the Polish language would gain equal rights to the German language in the region.

The commission eventually had to remove both the mayor of Allenstein, Georg Zülch, and an officer of Sicherheitswehr, Major Oldenburg, after a Polish banner at the local consulate of Poland was defaced. The Poles expressed gratitude for Allied protection of Polish rights and underlined their desire for peaceful co-existence with the Germans.

In April 1920, during a Polish theatrical performance in Deuthen (Dajtki), near Allenstein, Poles were attacked by pro-German activists. As demanded by the Allied Commission, the German police escorted Polish actors but they ignored the attackers. In Bischofsburg (Biskupiec), a pogrom against Poles was organised, which prompted the creation of a special commission to find the perpetrators. The Allensteiner Zeitung newspaper called on its readers to remain calm and to cease pogroms against Poles and pointed out that they could lead to postponing the plebiscite, which would go against German interests.

Italian forces were sent to Lötzen (Giżycko), according to Minakowski, to protect the Poles after a pogrom had occurred on 17 April. In May, several attacks on Poles were reported in Osterode (Ostróda) and included attacks on coworkers of the Masurian Committee.

=== Marienwerder / Kwidzyn Plebiscite Area ===
Parts of the Marienwerder Government Region were confined as the Marienwerder Plebiscite Area. The commission for the plebiscite area reached Marienwerder (Kwidzyn) on 17 February 1920. Upon its arrival, it found an Italian battalion of Bersaglieri on guard that then marched past at the double. The commission had about 1,400 uniformed German police under its authority. Beaumont was accused by Poles of having a cold and ironic attitude toward them.

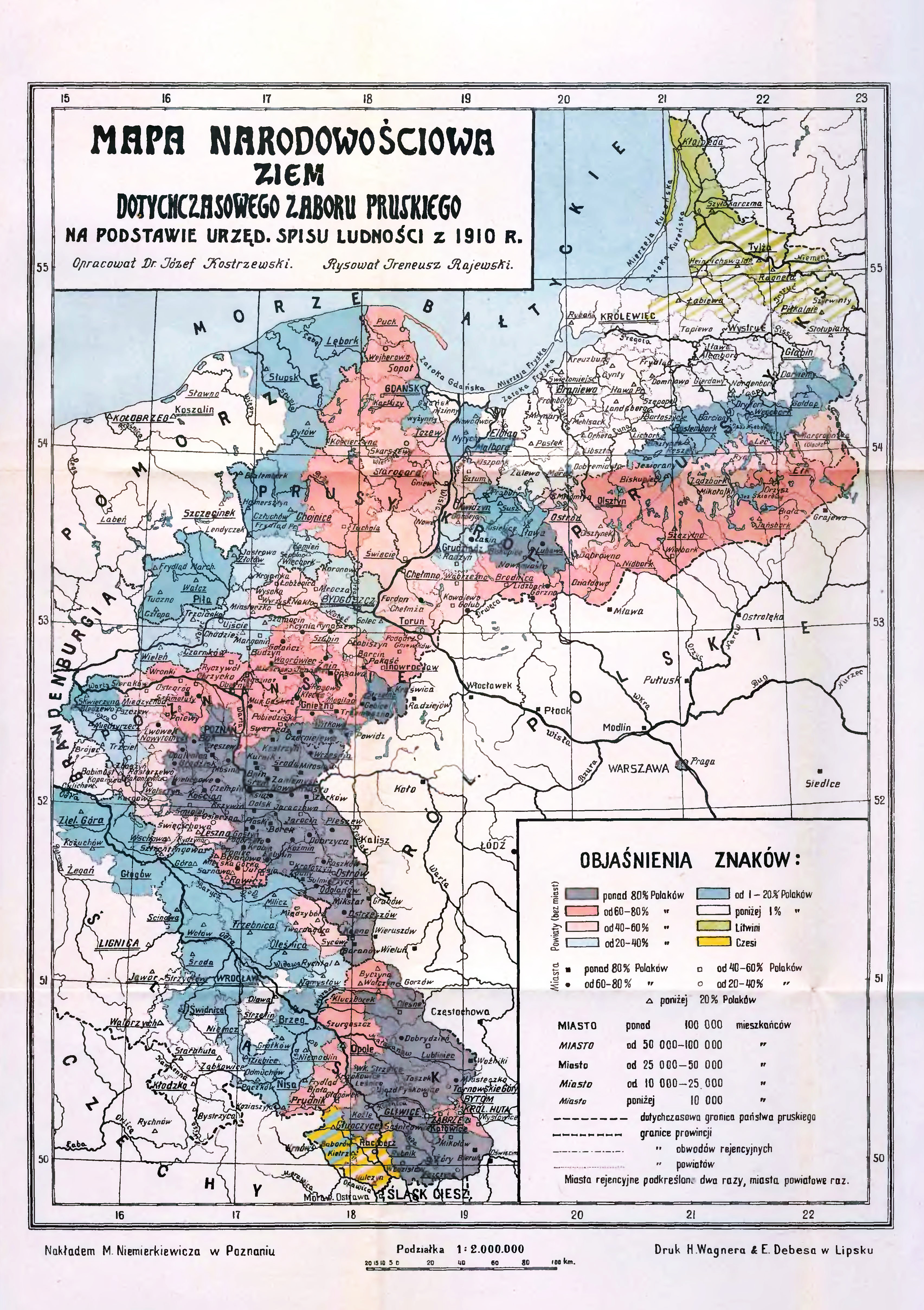
Map of the eastern parts of Prussia, showing the percentage of ethnic Poles.

Beaumont said that with the exception of the Kreis Stuhm, where Poles admittedly numbered 15,500 out of a population of 36,500 (42%), they had Polish sympathies since they were Catholics. In the other districts, with the exception of Allenstein, Poles depicting themselves as Mazurians were Lutherans and German in a national conviction.

On the eve of the plebiscite, Beaumont reported that Poles strictly guarded the new frontier between East Prussia and Poland to prevent people from passing to East Prussia without vexatious formalities. They held up trains for hours and constantly interrupted or even completely suppressed postal, telegraphic and telephonic communication service. The great bridge over the Vistula at Dirschau was barred by sentries in French uniforms, "who refuse to understand any language but Polish". As a result, Beaumont wrote that area to have been "cut off from its shopping centre and chief port almost completely".

After the plebiscite, the bridge was removed. To Beaumont, it would be "desirable to convey a hint to the Warsaw Government that their present policy is scarcely calculated to gain them votes".

Sir Horace Rumbold, the British minister in Warsaw, also wrote to George Curzon on 5 March 1920 that the Plebiscite Commissions at Allenstein and Marienwerder "felt that they were isolated both from Poland and from Germany" and that the Polish authorities were holding up supplies of coal and petrol to those districts. Rumbold had a meeting with the Polish Minister for Foreign Affairs, Stanisław Patek, who declared that he was disappointed with his people's behaviour and "spoke strongly about the tactlessness and rigidity of the Polish Military authorities".

On 10 March, Beaumont wrote of numerous continuing difficulties being made by Polish officials and stressed the "ill-will between Polish and German nationalities and the irritation due to Polish intolerance towards the German inhabitants in the Corridor (now under their rule), far worse than any former German intolerance of the Poles, are growing to such an extent that it is impossible to believe the present settlement (borders) can have any chance of being permanent...".

The Poles began to harden their position, and Rumbold reported to Curzon on 22 March 1920 that Count Stefan Przeździecki, an official of the Polish Foreign Office, had told Sir Percy Loraine, First Secretary at the legation at Warsaw, that the Poles questioned the impartiality of the Inter-Allied Commissions and indicated that the Polish government might refuse to recognise the results of the plebiscites.

Infiltration attempts of Polish irregulars into the Marienwerder area were checked by Italian troops.

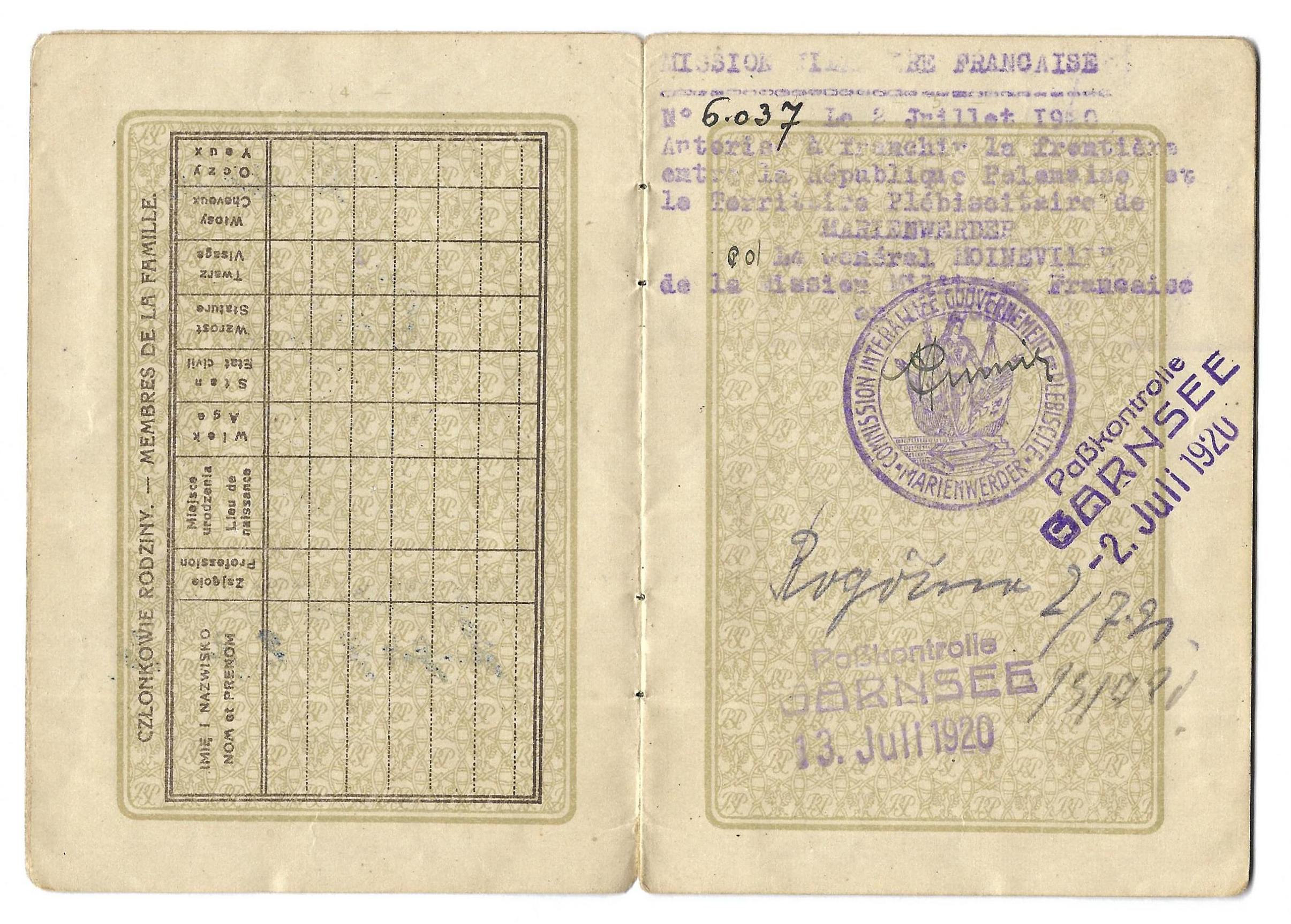
2nd Republic early passport with an Inter-Allied visa from Marienwerder, 1920.

== Propaganda ==
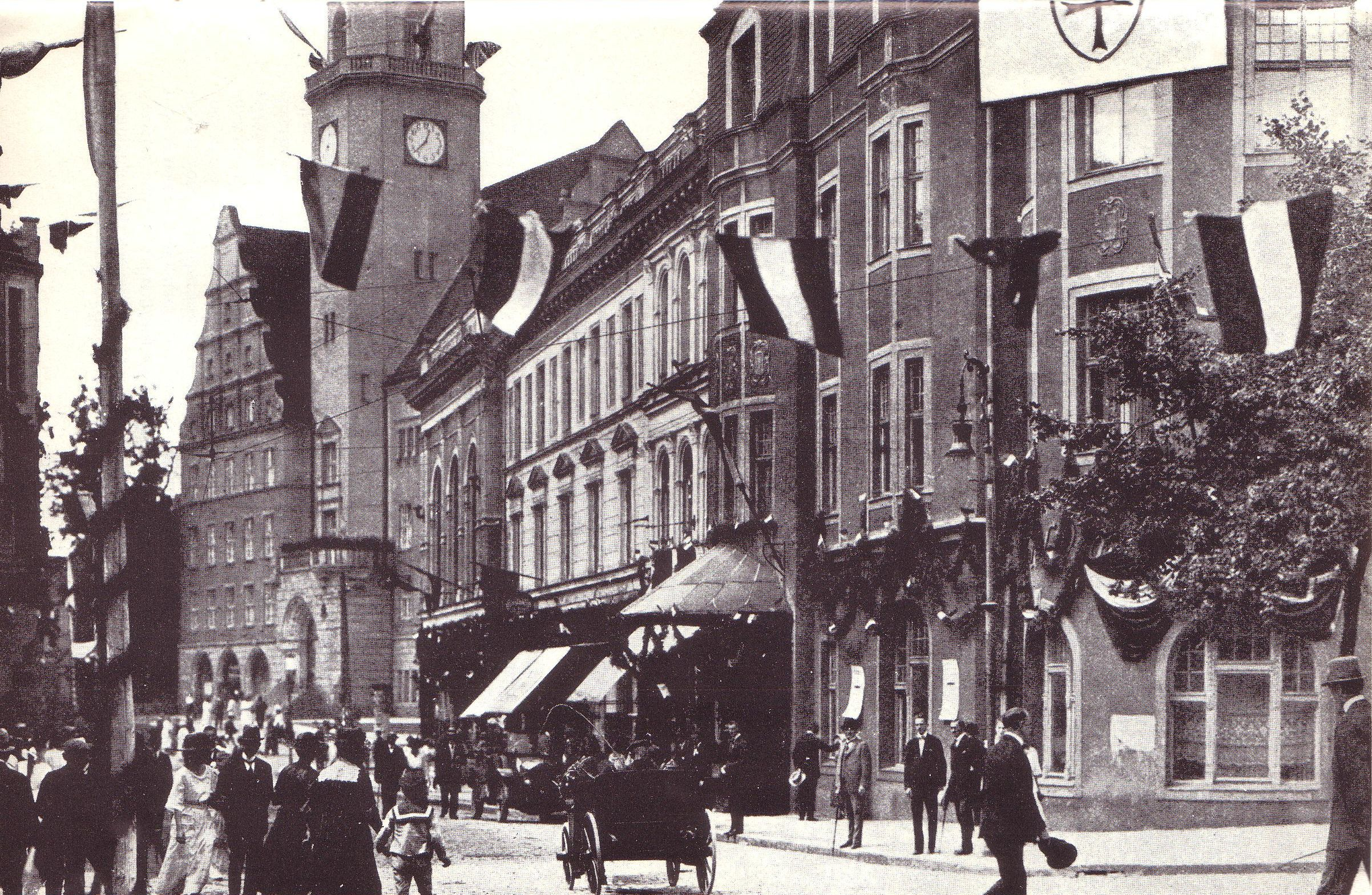
The "German House", the headquarters of the Ostdeutscher Heimatdienst, in Allenstein in July 1920

=== German "Heimatdienst" ===
Both sides started a propaganda campaign. In March 1919 Paul Hensel, the Lutheran Superintendent of Johannisburg, had travelled to Versailles to hand over a collection of 144,447 signatures to the Allies to protest the planned cession. Pro-German campaigners collected several regional associations under the Ostdeutscher Heimatdienst (East German Homeland Service), which collected over 220,000 members. The Heimatdienst in the region was led by Max Worgitzki, an author and publisher of the Ostdeutsche Nachrichten.

The Heimatdienst exerted strong psychological pressure on Masurians to vote for Germany and threatened Polish forces with physical violence. They appealed to Prussian history and loyalty to the Prussian state, disqualified Polish culture and warned of the Catholic religion and Poland's alleged economical backwardness. The pro-Germans presented the probability that all men would be drafted into the Polish military to fight Soviet Russia if they voted for the annexation by Poland. A Soviet invasion was then being attempted in the alleged eastern parts of Poland.

Those were no new standpoints but had been the prevailing beliefs in Mazurian public mind for decades. The nationalist feelings were recently strengthened even more by the massive rebuilding programme of the devastated towns, which had been destroyed during the Russian invasion in the autumn of 1914 and were being financially adopted by large German cities. Rennie, the British commissioner in Allenstein, reported on 11 March 1920, that "in those parts which touch the Polish frontier a vigorous German propaganda is in progress" and that "the Commission is doing all it can to prevent German officials in the district from taking part in national propaganda in connection with the Plebiscite. Ordinances and instructions in this sense have been issued".

=== Polish campaign ===
A delegation of Masurians petitioned the Allies in March 1919 to join their region with Poland.

The Poles established an unofficial Masurian Plebiscite Committee (Mazurski Komitet Plebiscytowy) on 6 June 1919. It was chaired by a Polish citizen, Juliusz Bursche, later Bishop of the Evangelical-Augsburg Church in Poland. There was also an unofficial Warmian Plebiscite Committee. They tried to convince the Masurians of Warmia (Ermland) and Masuria that they were victims of a long period of Germanisation but that the Poles now had the opportunity to liberate themselves from Prussian rule.

Rennie reported to Curzon at the British Foreign Office on 18 February 1920 that the Poles, who had taken control of the Polish Corridor to the Baltic Sea, had "entirely disrupted the railway, telegraphic and telephone system, and the greatest difficulty is being experienced".

Rennie reported on 11 March 1920 the arrival of the Polish Consul-General, Zenon Lewandowski, a 60-year-old former chemist who kept a shop in Poznań (Posen). Rennie described Lewandowski as having "little experience of official life" and that Lewandowski had begun to send complaints to the Commission immediately after his arrival in which he declared that the district's entire Polish population had been terrorised for years and so was unable to express their sentiments. Rennie reported an incident as Lewandowski repeatedly hoisted the Polish flag at the consular office, which caused popular protests. Rennie "pointed out to Dr. Lewandowski that he ought to realise that his position here was a delicate one... and I added it was highly desirable that his office should not be situated in a building with the Bureau of Polish propaganda".

Undercover and illicit activities also started as early as 11 March 1920, when the Earl of Derby reported a decision of the Allied Council of Ambassadors in Paris to make representations to the Polish government regarding the violations of the frontiers of the Marienwerder Plebiscite Area towards Germans by Polish soldiers.

Beaumont reported from Marienwerder at the end of March that "no change has been made in the methods of Polish propaganda. Occasional meetings are held, but they are attended only by Poles in small numbers". He continued to note that "acts and articles violently abusive of everything German in the newly founded Polish newspaper appear to be the only (peaceful) methods adopted to persuade the inhabitants of the Plebiscite areas to vote for Poland".

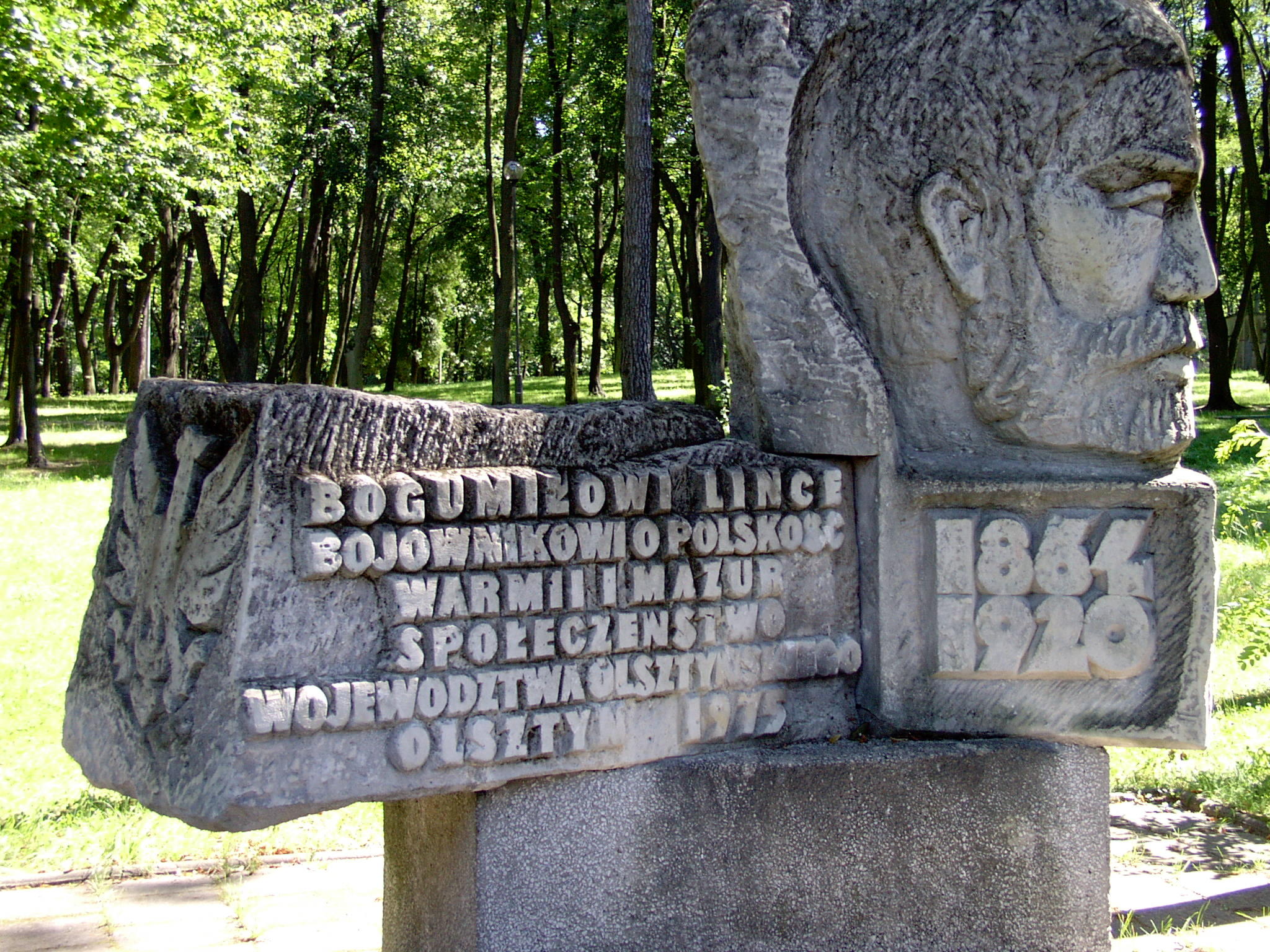
Monument to Bogumił Linka, pro-Polish activist murdered by German militia during the plebiscite

The Germans tried to sway the voters in the area before the plebiscite by using violence, with Polish organisations and activists being harassed by pro-German militias. Actions included murder, the most notable example being the killing of Bogumił Linka, a native Masurian member of the Polish delegation to Versailles, who supported voting for Poland. His death described as "bestial murder" after he had been beaten to death by pro-German militias armed with crowbars, metal rods, and shovels. His ribs were punctured by shovel, and he was taken to hospital, where he died after he had been barely alive and bled from the neck and the head. After his burial, the grave of Linka was defiled.

Masurians who supported voting for Poland were singled out and subjected to terror and repressions. Names of Masurians supporting the Polish side were published in pro-German newspapers, and their photographs were presented in shops of pro-German owners. Later, regular hunts were organised after them. In the pursuit of Polish supporters, the local Poles were terrorized by pro-German militias. The "Gazeta Olsztyńska" wrote, "Unspeakable terror lasted till the last days [of the plebiscite]".

At least 3,000 Warmian and Masurian activists engaged for Poland had to flee the region for fear of their lives. The German police engaged in active surveillance of the Polish minority and attacks against pro-Polish activists.

It may be concluded that propaganda and manipulation caused the German side to be put in favour in many respects above the Polish one, but it is disputed if that caused the final result.

== Plebiscite ==
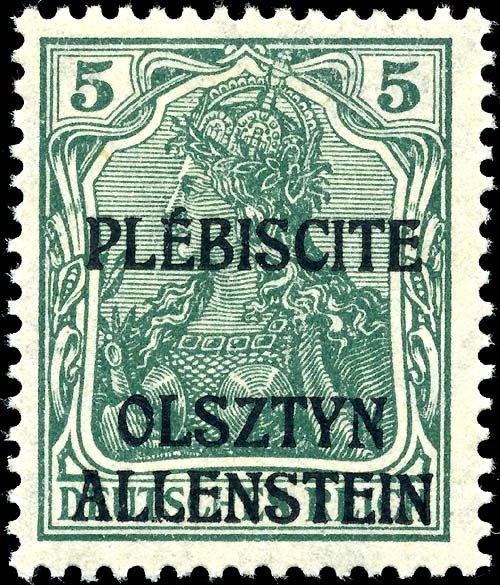
5-Pfennig stamp. To advertise the plebiscite, special postage stamps were produced by overprinting German stamps and sold from 3 April. One kind of overprint read PLÉBISCITE / OLSZTYN / ALLENSTEIN, and the other read TRAITÉ / DE / VERSAILLES / ART. 94 et 95 inside an oval whose border gave the full name of the plebiscite commission. Each overprint was applied to 14 denominations ranging from 5 Pf to 3 M.

The plebiscites asked voters whether they wanted their homeland to remain in East Prussia or to become a part of it, as to the Marienwerder Plebiscite Area, which was part of Weimar Germany, or to become part of Poland (the alternatives for the voters were not Poland or Germany but Poland or East Prussia, the latter of which was not a sovereign nation). All inhabitants of the plebiscite areas older than 20 or those who were born in the area before 1 January 1905 were entitled to return to vote.

=== Accusations of falsification and manipulation ===
According to Minakowski, pro-Polish activists decided to boycott the preparations for electoral commissions before the plebiscite to protest the unequal treatment of the Polish and German side and pro-German terror, which allowed German officials to falsify lists with eligible voters by adding names of dead or ineligible people.

During the plebiscite, Germans transported pro-German voters to numerous locations, which allowed them to cast multiple votes. In Allenstein (Olsztyn), cards with pro-Polish votes were simply taken away by a German official, who declared that they were "invalid" and presented voters with pro-German cards. Voters were observed by the German police in polling stations. Pro-Polish voting cards were often hidden or taken away, and Polish controllers were removed from polling stations. A large number of Poles feared reprisals and did not turn out for the plebiscite.

== Results ==
The plebiscite took place on 11 July 1920, when Poland appeared on the verge of defeat in the Polish-Soviet War (see Miracle at the Vistula). The pro-German side was able to organise a very successful propaganda campaign by building on the long campaign of Germanisation; notably, the plebiscite asking the electorate to vote for Poland or East Prussia is said to have masked the pro-German choice under the provincial name of East Prussia. However, the weight of that argument can not have been strong because the voters were aware East Prussia was just a German province, not a sovereign state, as an alternative for Germany. The activity of pro-German organisations and the Allied support for the participation of those who were born in the plebiscite area but did not live there any longer helped the vote toward Germany. In the end, the weight of the evidently-substantial number of pro-German emigration voters can be ignored in the light of the 96% pro-German overall total. Anyway, the plebiscite resulted in a vast majority for East Prussia. Only a small part of the territory affected by the plebiscite was awarded to Poland, and most of it remained in Germany.

Poland's supposed disadvantage by the Versailles Treaty stipulation was that it enabled those to return to vote if they were born in the plebiscite areas but no longer living there. Most of them were supposed to have been influenced by German national sentiments. For that reason, German nationalist societies and political parties wanted to assist them by facilitating their travel to the plebiscite area. Approximately 152,000 such individuals participated in the plebiscite.

However, debate went on whether it was a Polish or German condition at Versailles, since it might have been expected that many Ruhr Area Poles would vote for Poland as well. Therefore, it is also reported that the Polish delegation planned to bring Polish émigrés not only from other parts of Germany, but also from America, to the plebiscite area to strengthen their position, but those plans were not executed. The Polish delegation claimed that was a German condition.

According to Richard K. Debo, both the German and the Polish governments believed that the outcome of the plebiscite had been decided by the ongoing Polish-Bolshevik War, which threatened the very existence of the newly-formed Polish state itself and so many Poles in the region voted for Germany for fear that if the area joined Poland, it would soon fall under Soviet rule. During the plebiscite, the Red Army came closer to Warsaw every day and committed crimes against the civilian population.

According to several Polish sources, the Germans engaged in a massive persecution of Polish activists and their Masurian supporters and went as far as engaging in regular hunts and murder to influence the vote. The organisation of the plebiscite was also influenced by Britain, which supported Germany out of fear of an increased power for France in postwar Europe.

According to Jerzy Minakowski, terror and their unequal status made Poles boycott the preparations for the plebiscite, which allowed the Germans to add ineligible voters.

After the plebiscite in Masuria, attacks on Poles occurred by pro-German mobs. In particular, Polish priests and politicians were charged, even in their homes.

These results were published by Poland in 1920, but gave Polish place names as fixed in the late 1940s:

=== Olsztyn/Allenstein Plebiscite Area ===
The results for Olsztyn / Allenstein Plebiscite Area were:

District	Capital (present name)	Region	Votes for East Prussia	%	votes for Poland	%
Allenstein, urban district	Allenstein (Olsztyn)	Allenstein	16,742	98.0%	342	2.0%
Allenstein, rural district	Allenstein (Olsztyn)	Allenstein	31,707	86.7%	4,871	13.3%
Johannisburg	Johannisburg (Pisz)	Allenstein	33,817	99.9%	14	<0.1%
Lötzen	Lötzen (Giżycko)	Allenstein	29,349	99.9%	10	<0.1%
Lyck	Lyck (Ełk)	Allenstein	36,573	99.9%	44	0.1%
Neidenburg	Neidenburg (Nidzica)	Allenstein	22,235	98.5%	330	1.5%
Oletzko	Marggrabowa (Olecko)	Gumbinnen	28,625	100%	2	nil%
Ortelsburg	Ortelsburg (Szczytno)	Allenstein	48,207	98.5%	497	1.5%
Osterode	Osterode (Ostróda)	Allenstein	46,368	97.8%	1,031	2.2%
Rößel	Bischofsburg (Biskupiec)	Allenstein	35,248	97.9%	758	2.1%
Sensburg	Sensburg (Mrągowo)	Allenstein	34,332	99.9%	25	0.1%
Total	-	-	363,209	97.9%	7,980	2.1%
Voter turnout 87.3% (371,715)						

Registered voters: 425,305, valid: 371,189, turnout: 87.3%

To honour the exceptionally high percentage of pro-German votes in the district of Oletzko, with 2 votes for Poland compared to 28,625 for Germany, the district town Marggrabowa (i.e. Margrave town) was renamed "Treuburg" (Treue^{German} = "loyalty") in 1928, with the district following this example in 1933.

In the villages of Lubstynek (Klein Lobenstein), Czerlin (Klein Nappern) and Groszki (Groschken) in the District of Osterode in East Prussia (Ostróda), situated directly at the border, the majority voted for Poland and joined Poland after the plebiscite. Other Polish-majority villages were scarce but would have been more numerous if they had not been surrounded by Mazurian German disposed villages, which made a geographical connection with Poland improbable and so votes for Poland would not be useful.

The strategic importance of the Prussian Eastern Railway line Danzig-Warsaw passing through the area of Soldau in the Neidenburg District caused it to be transferred to Poland without a plebiscite; it was renamed Działdowo.

=== Marienwerder / Kwidzyn Plebiscite Area ===
The results for the precincts of Marienwerder / Kwidzyn were:

District	Capital (present name)	Region	Votes for East Prussia	%	Votes for Poland	%
Marienburg	Marienburg in Westpreußen (Malbork)	Danzig	17,805	98.9%	191	1.1%
Marienwerder	Marienwerder (Kwidzyn)	Marienwerder	25,608	93.7%	1,779	6.3%
Rosenberg	Rosenberg in Westpreußen (Susz)	Marienwerder	33,498	96.9%	1,073	3.1%
Stuhm	Stuhm (Sztum)	Marienwerder	19,984	80.3%	4,904	19.7%
Total	-	-	96,923	92.4%	8,018	7.6%
Voter turnout 84% (105,071)						

Registered voters: 125,090 valid: 104,941 turnout: 84%

The West Prussian plebiscite area remained with Germany and became part of the new West Prussia Government Region, which was annexed to East Prussia in 1922.

== See also ==
- Territorial changes of Germany after World War I
- Territorial changes of Poland after World War I
- 1920 Schleswig plebiscites
- Upper Silesia plebiscite
- Warmian-Masurian Voivodeship
