= Artur Fürst =

German-Jewish author

Artur Fürst (23 February 1880 – 13 May 1926) was a German-Jewish author of novels and short stories.

Fürst was born in Rosenberg, West Prussia. At the center of Fürst's works are innovations and discoveries in science and technology such as the telephone, railway, and aviation. He was one of the most popular authors in the 1910s and 1920s. He became famous for his praise of Albert Einstein as the "Galileo of the 20th Century" in his Book of 1000 Miracles, which he co-authored with Alexander Moszkowski. Critics frequently noted the accuracy of historical and technical details, combined with his refined and elegant style of writing, in Fürst's books. Some of his works have been translated and re-printed.

== Books ==
- The miracles around us. New insights into nature and technology (Die Wunder um uns. Neue Einblicke in die Natur und Technik), 1911
- The world on rails (Die Welt auf Schienen), 1918
- The empire of technology (Das Weltreich der Technik), 4 volumes, 1924
- The book of 1000 miracles (Das Buch der 1000 Wunder), 1930
