= Postage stamps and postal history of Allenstein =

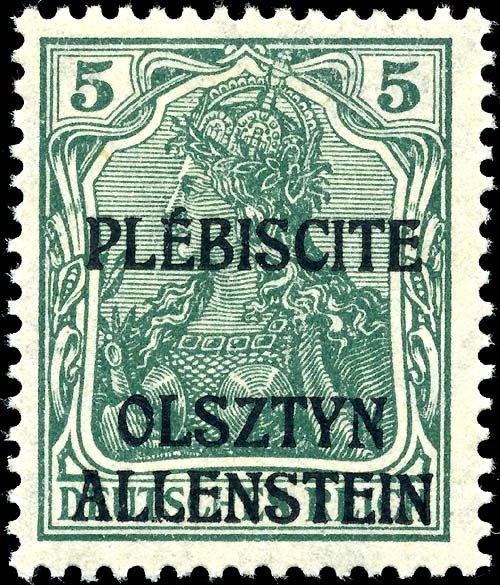
5 pfennig stamp

In 1920 a plebiscite was held to determine whether the populace of the Region of Allenstein wished to remain in East Prussia and that in parts of the Region of Marienwerder to become part of that province in reconfined borders, or become part of Poland. In order to advertise the plebiscite, special postage stamps were produced by overprinting German stamps and sold from 3 April. One kind of overprint read PLÉBISCITE / OLSZTYN / ALLENSTEIN, while the other read TRAITÉ / DE / VERSAILLES / ART. 94 et 95 inside an oval whose border gave the full name of the plebiscite commission. Each overprint was applied to 14 denominations ranging from 5 Pf to 3 M.

The plebiscite was held on 11 July, and produced 362,209 votes (97.8%) for East Prussia and 7,980 votes (2.2%) for Poland. The stamps became invalid on 20 August. Despite the short period of use, almost all of the stamps are cheaply available both used and unused.

After the Second World War, on 2 August 1945, the city became part of Poland under terms of the Potsdam Agreement) and officially renamed as Olsztyn.
