= Susz =

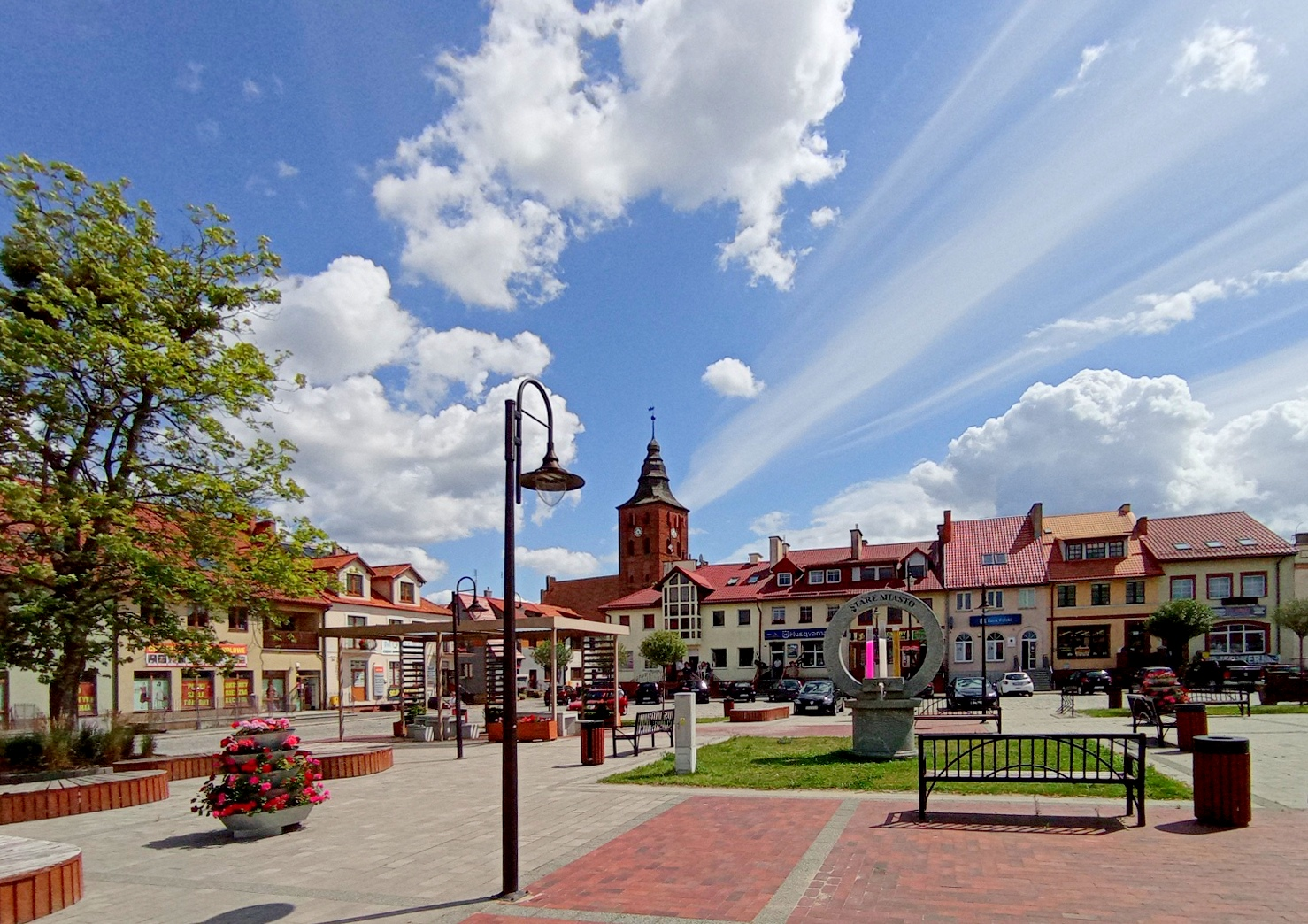
- Centre of the town

- Coat of arms

- Location within Poland
- Coordinates: 53°43′12″N 19°20′14″E
- Country: Poland
- Voivodeship: Warmian-Masurian
- County: Iława
- Gmina: Susz

Area
  - Total: 6.67 km^{2} (2.58 sq mi)

Population (2024)
  - Total: 5,245
  - Density: 786/km^{2} (2,040/sq mi)
- Time zone: UTC+1 (CET)
  - Summer (DST): UTC+2 (CEST)
- Postal code: 14-240
- Vehicle registration: NIL
- Website: http://www.susz.pl

Susz [suʂ] (German: Rosenberg in Westpreußen) is a town in Iława County, Warmian-Masurian Voivodeship, in northern Poland, with 5,245 inhabitants (2024).

== Geographical location ==
Susz is situated on the northern and western shores of Suskie Lake in the Powiśle region about 26 kilometres (16 miles) east of Kwidzyn, 48 kilometres (30 miles) south of Elbląg and 130 kilometres (81 miles) south-west of Kaliningrad at an altitude of 114 metres (374 feet) above sea level.

== History ==
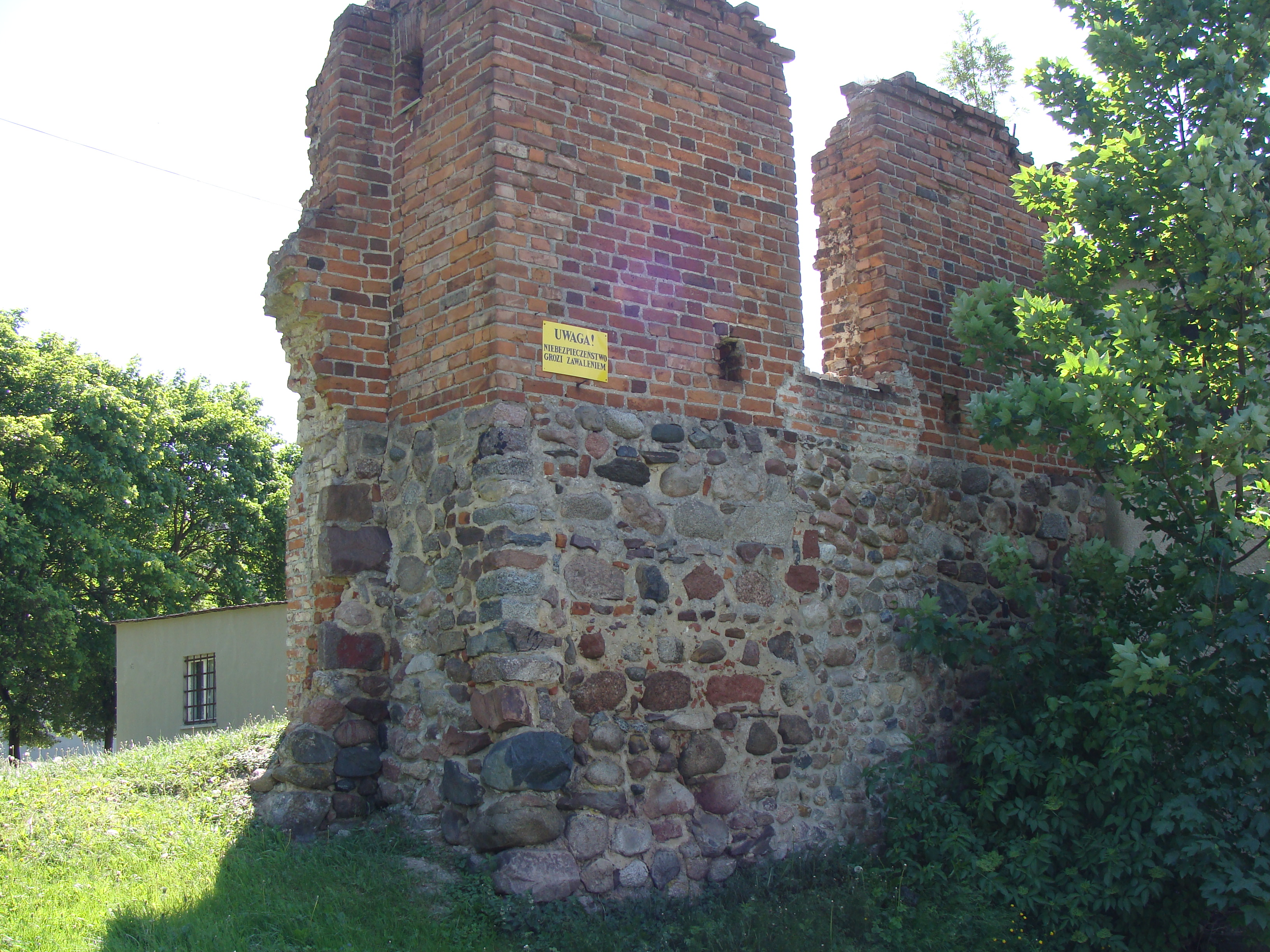
Remains of the defensive walls of Susz

The town was developed at the site of a former Baltic Prussian settlement named Susse, from which comes the town's Polish name Susz. Throughout its history the town carried a rose in its coat of arms (in German Rosenberg means "rose hill"). In 1454, King Casimir IV Jagiellon incorporated the town and the surrounding region to the Kingdom of Poland upon the request of the Prussian Confederation. After the subsequent Thirteen Years' War (1454–1466), the Teutonic Order regained authority over the town as a fief of the Polish Crown. In 1525 it became part of the secularized Duchy of Prussia. From the 18th century the town, known in German as Rosenberg, was part of the Kingdom of Prussia, and between 1871 and 1945, it was part of the German Reich.

During the Napoleonic Wars, in 1807, the town was occupied by France. In the 19th century, the town's Polish inhabitants were subjected to Germanisation policies. In October 1831, various Polish infantry units of the November Uprising stopped in the town on the way to their internment places. Around 1900, the town had a Protestant church, a Catholic church and a synagogue. The town was the capital of the Rosenberg district in the Prussian Province of West Prussia. According to the census of 1910, Rosenberg had a population of 3,181, of which 3,129 (98.4%) were Germans and 34 (1.1%) were Poles.

After World War I and the re-establishment of independent Poland, during the ongoing Polish-Soviet War, a plebiscite was held in parts of East Prussia and West Prussia on 11 July 1920 to determine whether the region was to remain in Germany or join the Second Polish Republic. In the Rosenberg district, 33,498 (96.9%) voted to remain in Germany and 1,073 (3.1%) voted for Poland. In the town itself, 2,430 votes were cast in favour of Germany and only 8 votes were cast in favour of Poland. Based on that result, the district, along with the town, was included in the Regierungsbezirk West Prussia within the Prussian Province of East Prussia in Germany.

During World War II, from 26 October 1939 until 1945, Rosenberg was part of Regierungsbezirk Marienwerder in Reichsgau Danzig-West Prussia. The Germans operated a subcamp of the Stutthof concentration camp in the town. During the final stages of the war, the town was captured by the Red Army. After the end of war, the town became part of Poland under its Polish name Susz. After the town had been put under Polish administration, almost all German inhabitants who had remained in the town or had returned were expelled to Germany.

Historic churches of Susz

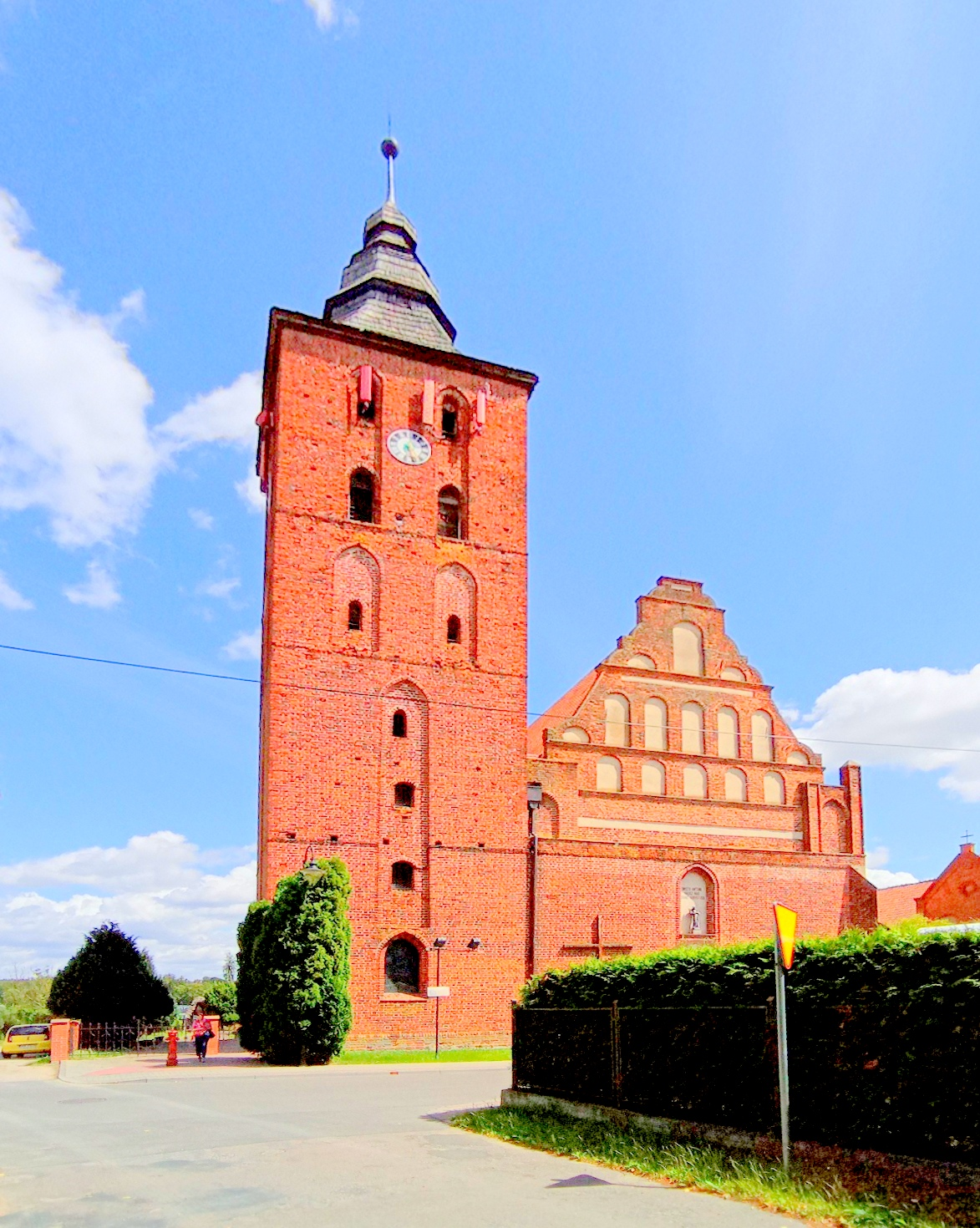
Saint Anthony church

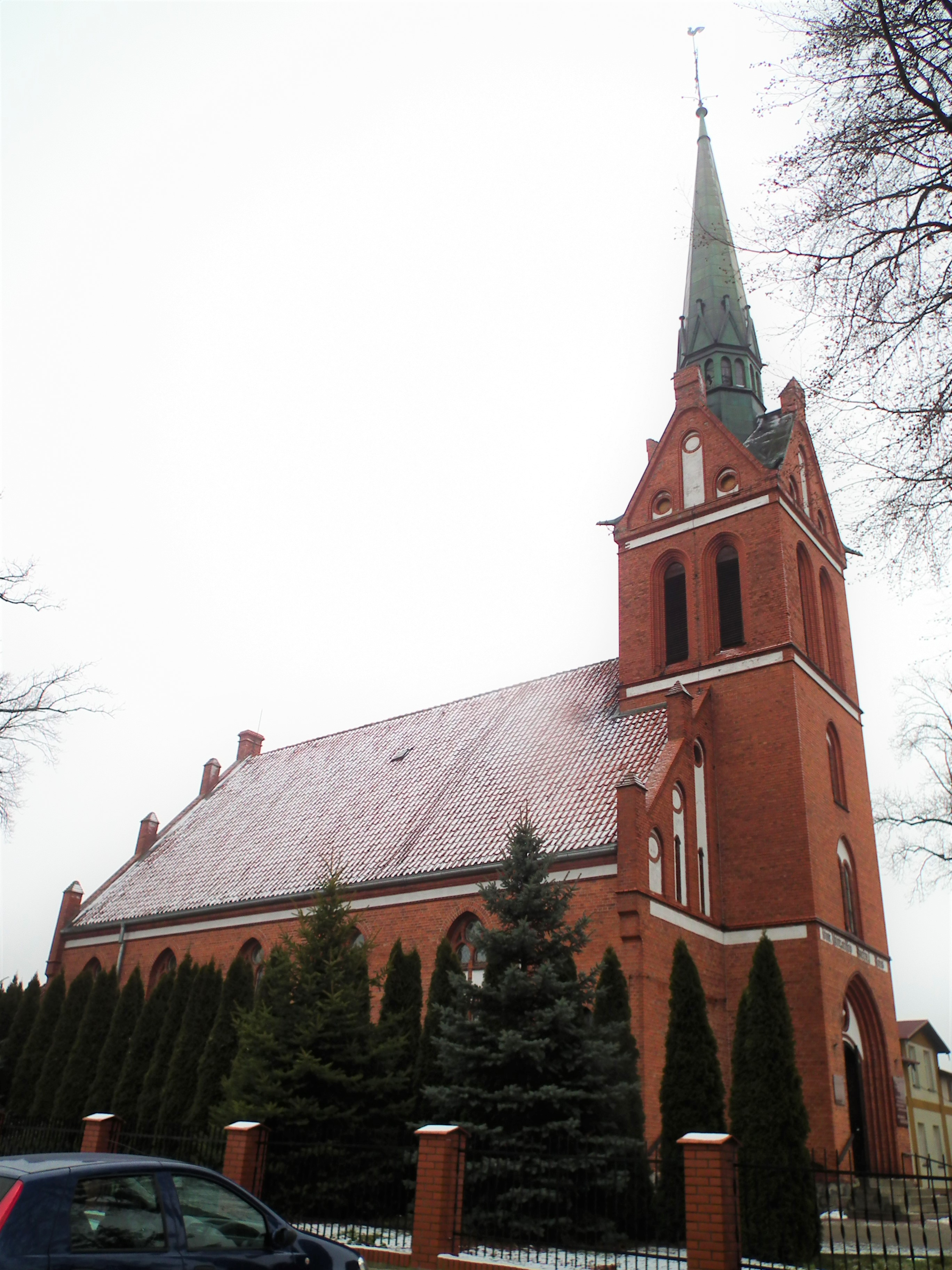
Saint Rosalia church

=== Number of inhabitants by year ===
Year	Number
1788	781
1829	1,570
1831	1,295
1875	3,081
1880	3,044
1885	3,055
1890	2,909
1905	3,259
1925	3,280
1933	3,822
1939	4,481
1943	4,440
2006	5,610
2024	5,245

== Transport ==
Susz is located at the intersection of voivodeship roads 515 and 521, and there is also a train station there.

== Notable residents ==
- Artur Fürst (1880–1926), German-Jewish author
- Beata Żbikowska (born 1934), Polish Olympic middle-distance runner
- Krzysztof Trybusiewicz (born 1949), Polish Olympic modern pentathlete
