= Emil von Behring =

German physiologist (1854–1917)

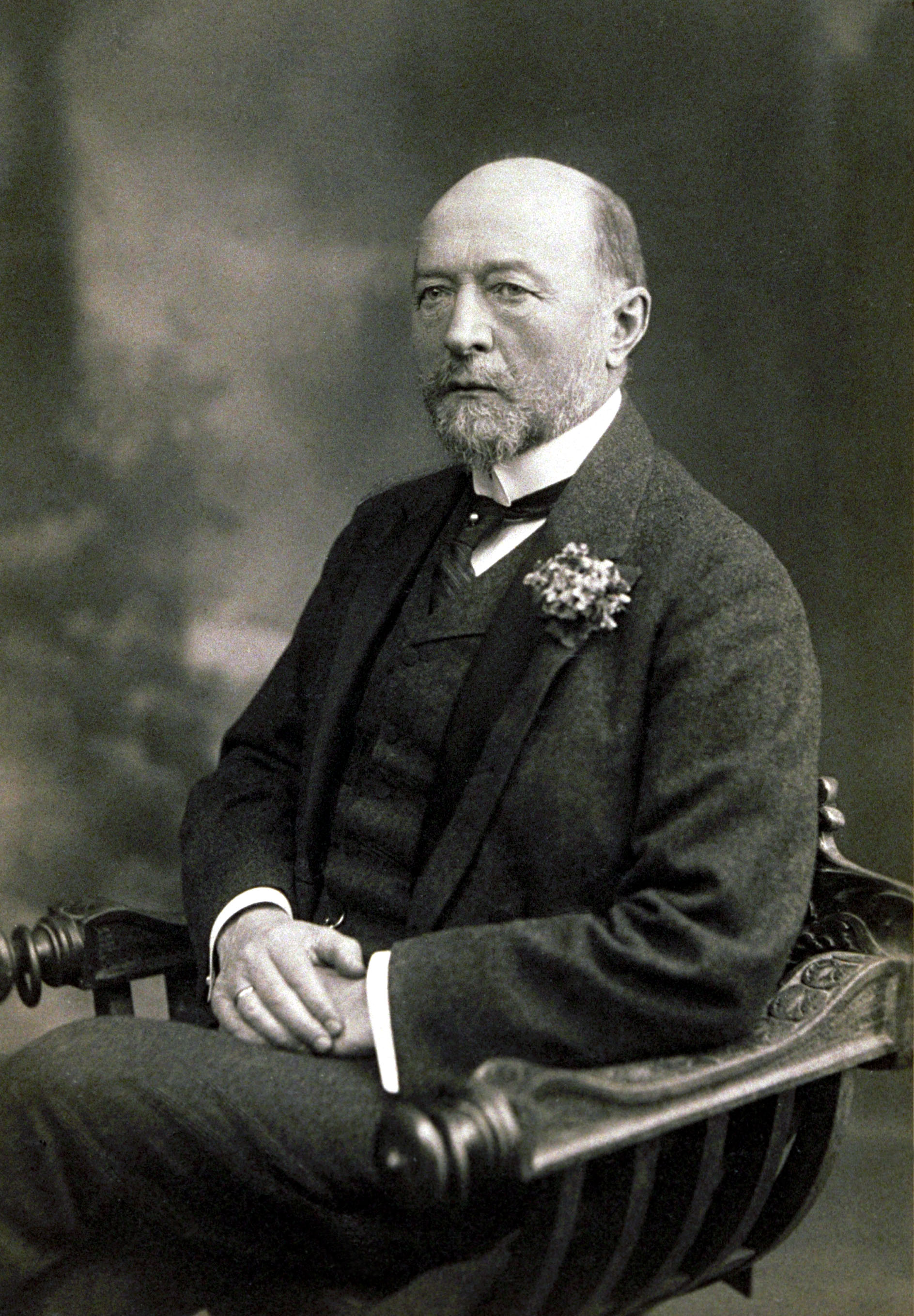
- Behring in 1913
- Born: Emil Adolf Behring; 15 March 1854; Hansdorf, Kreis Rosenberg in Westpreußen, Province of Prussia, Kingdom of Prussia, German Confederation (now Poland)
- Died: 31 March 1917 (aged 63); Marburg, Hesse-Nassau, Kingdom of Prussia, German Empire
- Known for: Diphtheria antitoxin/serum
- Awards: Cameron Prize for Therapeutics of the University of Edinburgh (1894); Nobel Prize in Physiology or Medicine (1901)
- Scientific career
- Fields: Physiology, immunology, ophthalmology
- Notable students: Hans Schlossberger

Emil von Behring (German: [ˈeːmiːl fɔn ˈbeːʁɪŋ]; Emil Adolf von Behring: born Emil Adolf Behring; 15 March 1854 – 31 March 1917) was a German physiologist. In 1901, he received the first Nobel Prize in Physiology or Medicine "for his work on serum therapy, especially its application against diphtheria, by which he has opened a new road in the domain of medical science and thereby placed in the hands of the physician a victorious weapon against illness and deaths". He was widely known as a "saviour of children", as diphtheria used to be a major cause of child death. His work with the disease, as well as tetanus, has come to bring him most of his fame and acknowledgment. He was honoured with Prussian nobility in 1901, henceforth being known by the surname "von Behring".

== Biography ==
Behring was born in Hansdorf, Kreis Rosenberg, Province of Prussia (now Ławice, Iława County, Poland). His father was a schoolmaster; the family had 13 children.

Between 1874 and 1878, Emil von Behring studied medicine at the Kaiser Wilhelm Academy in Berlin, an institution established for the training of military physicians. His enrollment there was largely due to financial necessity, as his family could not afford a civilian university education. During his studies, Behring conducted early research on the antiseptic properties of iodoform, reflecting the medical preoccupation of the time with preventing infection in surgical practice.

Following graduation, Behring earned his medical doctorate through work on neurotomia opticociliaris (optociliary neurotomy) which is a surgical procedure involving the optic nerve. Behring subsequently passed the state medical examination qualifying him to practice in the Marburg district. In 1878, as part of his military service obligations, he was stationed in Poland, where he investigated septic diseases, an experience that deepened his understanding of infection and wound pathology. His skill and diligence attracted attention, leading to his transfer back to Prussia to work under Robert Koch, whose laboratory at the Imperial Health Office was becoming a center of pioneering bacteriological research.

Behring's academic and professional advancement remained closely tied to his military sponsorship. For each semester of state-funded study he was required to complete a year of military service as a surgeon, a commitment that totaled two years, during which he served (1881–1883) with the Second Hussar Regiment.

An often overlooked aspect of Behring's early career was his research in ophthalmology, conducted during his tenure at Wicherkiewicz's hospital in Poznań. There, he authored a clinical paper on a case of ocular tumor, in which the patient ultimately succumbed to leukemia. Although the outcome was fatal, Behring's detailed pathological observations contributed to contemporary discussions on surgical techniques and therapeutic strategies for ocular disease. His early ophthalmologic training under renowned specialists such as Carl Ernst Schweigger and Wilhelm Uhthoff fostered this interest and culminated in his doctoral dissertation on diseases of the eye, a field that would later inform his meticulous experimental approach to infectious disease and immunity.

In 1890 he published an article with Kitasato Shibasaburō reporting that they had developed "antitoxins" against both diphtheria and tetanus. They had injected diphtheria and tetanus toxins into guinea pigs, goats and horses; when these animals developed immunity, they derived antitoxins (now known to contain antibodies) from their serum. This process was called "serum therapy" at the time. Behring described this therapy as a way to induce permanent immunity or "to stimulate the body's internal disinfection". These antitoxins could protect against and cure the diseases in non-immunized animals. In 1892 he started the first human trials of the diphtheria antitoxin, but they were unsuccessful. Successful treatment started in 1894, after the production and quantification of antitoxin had been optimized. In 1894, Behring was also awarded the Cameron Prize for Therapeutics of the University of Edinburgh.

By 1895 Behring became Professor of Hygienics within the Faculty of Medicine at the University of Marburg, a position held for the rest of his life. He and the pharmacologist Hans Horst Meyer had their laboratories in the same building, and Behring stimulated Meyer's interest in the mode of action of tetanus toxin.

Behring won the first Nobel Prize in Physiology or Medicine in 1901 for the development of serum therapies against diphtheria. His research colleague Kitasato Shibasaburō who had performed most of the meticulous work that laid the foundation for serum therapy in 1890, while nominated as well, was not awarded the Nobel Prize as it was only given to a single awardee at the time.

Emil von Behring was elected a Foreign Honorary Member of the American Academy of Arts and Sciences in 1902.

In 1904 he founded the Behringwerke in Marburg, a company to produce antitoxins and vaccines.

At the International Tuberculosis Congress in 1905 he announced that he had discovered "a substance proceeding from the virus of tuberculosis". This substance, which he designated "T C", plays the important part in the immunizing action of his "bovivaccine", which prevents bovine tuberculosis. He tried unsuccessfully to obtain a protective and therapeutic agents for humans.

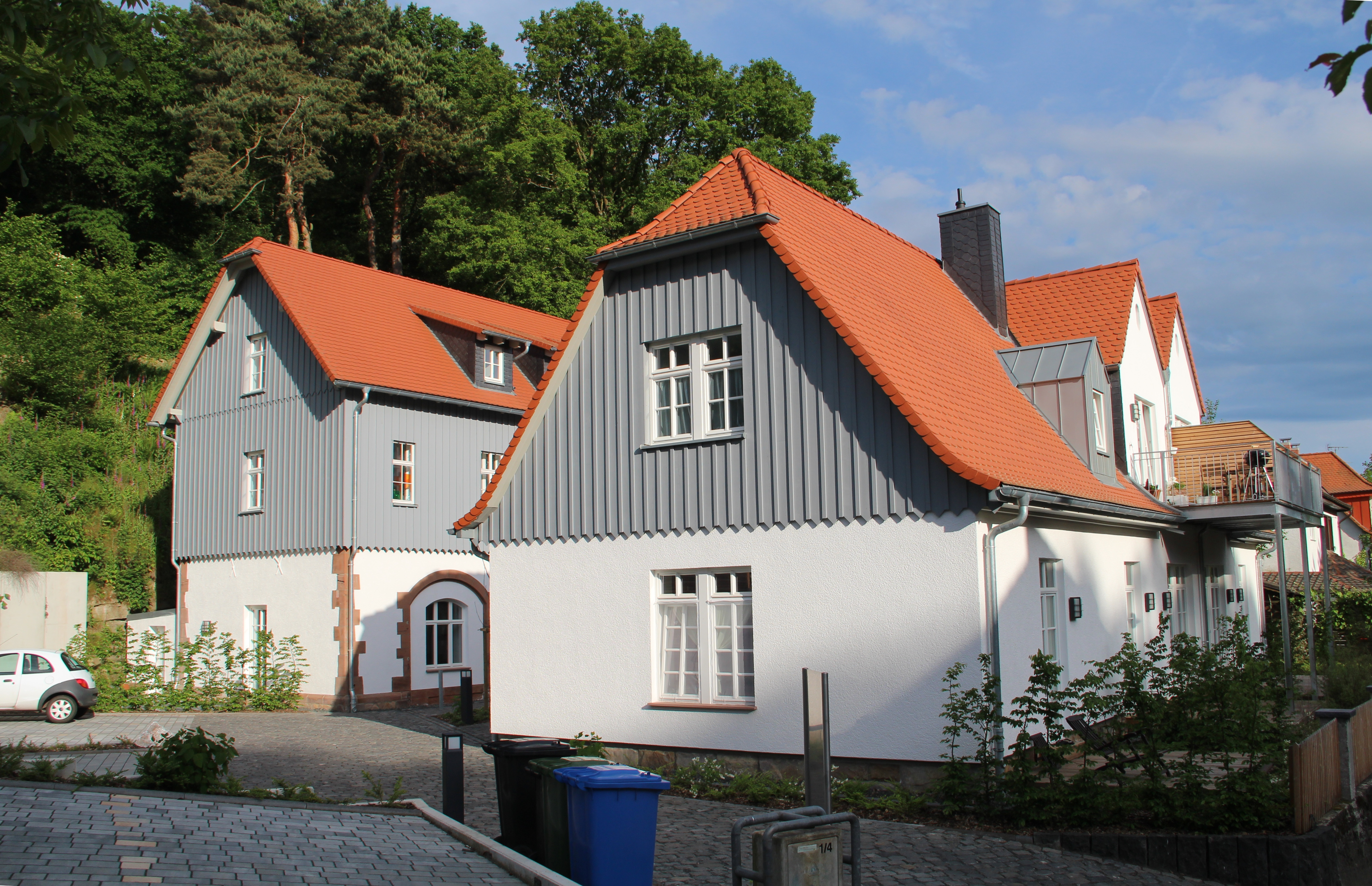
Laboratory of 1913 in the Wannkopfstraße in Marburg

Behring died at Marburg, Hessen-Nassau, on 31 March 1917. His name survived in the Dade Behring organisation (now part of the Siemens Healthineers), in CSL Behring, a manufacturer of plasma-derived biotherapies, in Novartis Behring and in the Emil von Behring Prize of the University of Marburg, the highest endowed medicine award in Germany.

His Nobel Prize medal is now kept on display at the International Red Cross and Red Crescent Museum in Geneva.

=== Controversy ===
von Behring is believed to have cheated Paul Ehrlich out of recognition and financial reward in relation to collaborative research in diphtheria. The two men developed a diphtheria serum by repeatedly injecting the deadly toxin into a horse. The serum was used effectively during an epidemic in Germany. A chemical company preparing to undertake commercial production and marketing of the diphtheria serum offered a contract to both men, but von Behring manoeuvered to claim all the considerable financial rewards for himself. To add insult to injury, only Behring received the first Nobel Prize in Medicine, in 1901, for his contributions. However, Ehrlich went on to win the 1908 Nobel Prize in Medicine for his contribution to immunology.

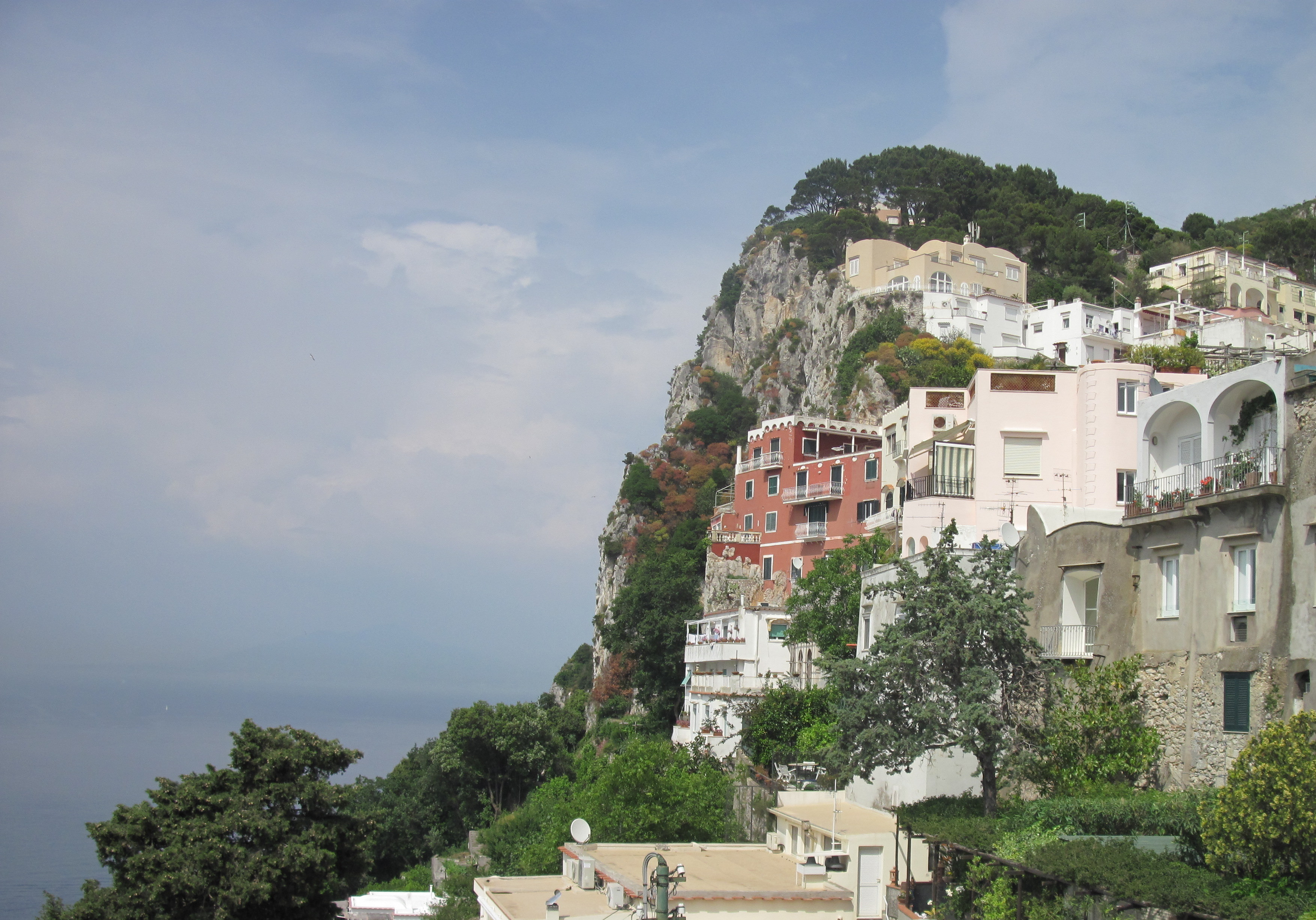
Villa Behring (burgundy) on Capri

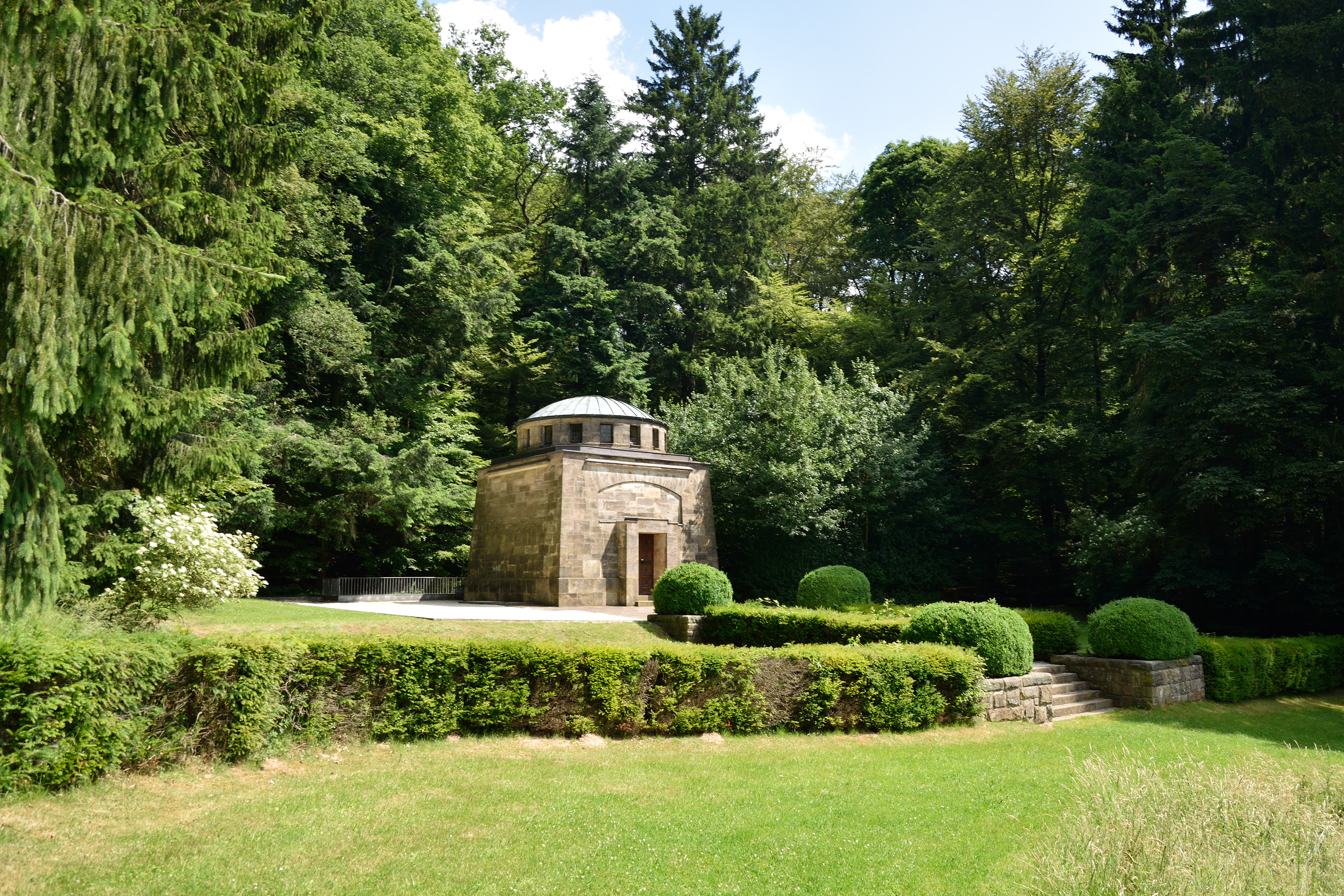
Behring mausoleum in Marburg

== Personal life ==
On 29 December 1896 Behring married the then twenty-year-old Else Spinola (1876–1936), who was a daughter of Bernhard Spinola, the director of the Charité hospital in Berlin, and a Jewish-born mother – Elise Spinola, born Bendix – who had converted to Christianity upon her marriage. The couple had six sons: Fritz (1898–1966), Bernhard (1900–1918, killed in action on 20 July 1918 in Cuchéry/Marne), Hans (1903–1982), Kurt (1905–1935), Emil (1906–1970), and Otto (1913–2002), two of whom, Hans and Otto von Behring, also studied medicine.

The couple held their honeymoon at villa "Behring" on Capri 1897, where Behring owned a vacation home. In 1909–1911, the Russian writer Maxim Gorky lived at this villa.

== Publications ==
- Die Blutserumtherapie (1892)
- Die Geschichte der Diphtherie (1893)
- Bekämpfung der Infektionskrankheiten (1894)
- Beiträge zur experimentellen Therapie (1906)
- E. v. Behring's Gesammelte Abhandlungen (1915) Digital edition by the University and State Library Düsseldorf

== See also ==
- German inventors and discoverers
