= Killing of Bogumił Linka =

Death of a Polish activist

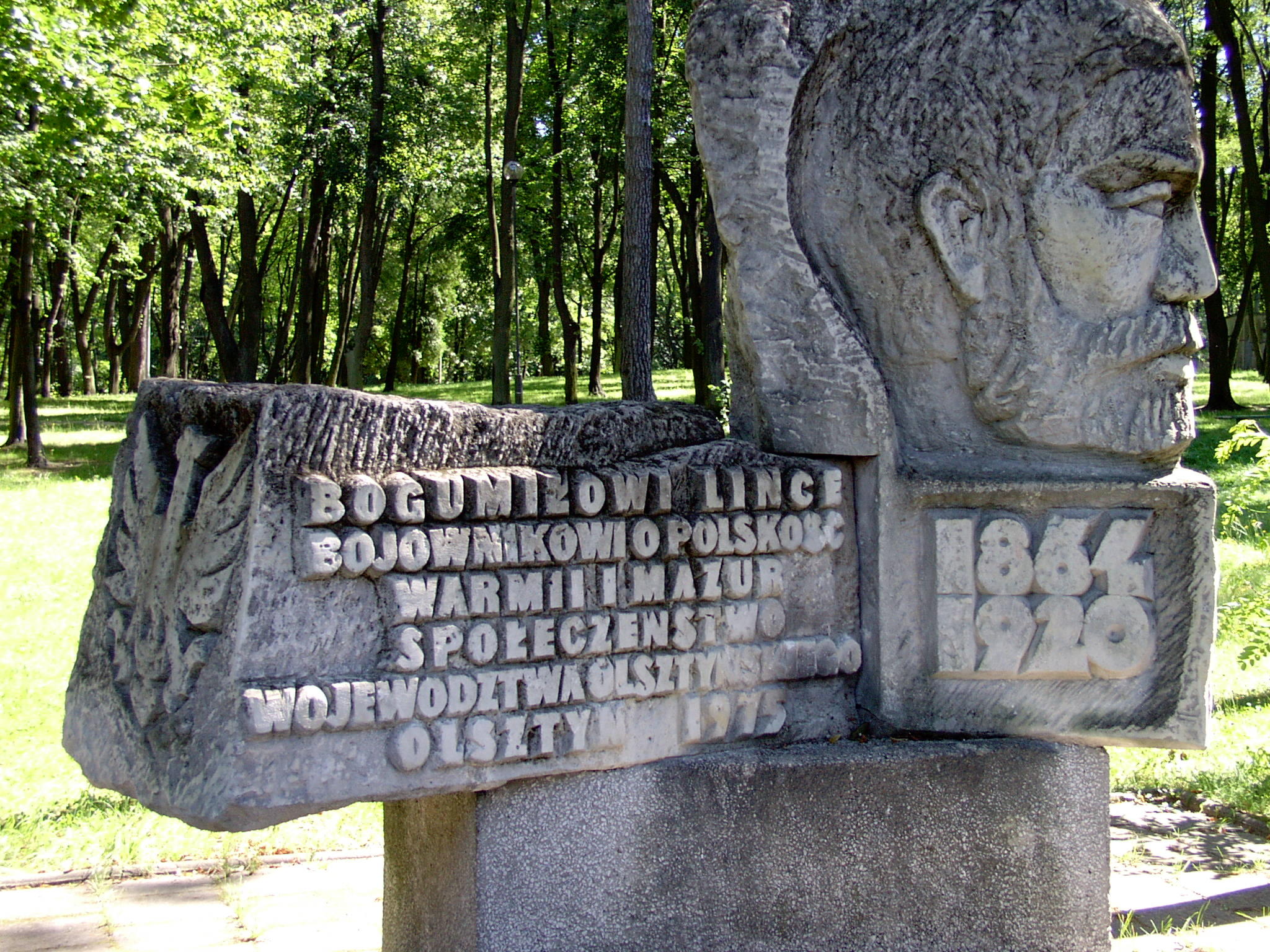
A monument to Linka in Olsztyn

Bogumił Linka (Gottlieb Linka) (born 5 February 1865 in Górki near Szczytno, died 29 March 1920 in Olsztyn) - was a Polish-Masurian social and national activist, early proponent of agricultural education, activist of the Masurian People's Party (MPL), member of the supervisory board of Bank Mazurski. In March 1919, Linke went with a delegation to the Paris Peace Conference, where he asked the allies for the incorporation of Warmia and Mazury into the newly independent Polish state without a plebiscite. After returning, the delegation was arrested by German authorities for high treason, but then released after the intervention of Marshal Foch. During "Bloody Wednesday" on 21 January 1920, Linke was severely beaten by German nationalist militias and transported to a hospital in Olsztyn, where he died of internal injuries.
