= Ławice =

- Village
- Location within Poland
- Coordinates: 53°36′N 19°40′E
- Country: Poland
- Voivodeship: Warmian-Masurian
- County: Iława
- Gmina: Iława

Ławice [waˈvit͡sɛ] (German Hansdorf) is a village in the administrative district of Gmina Iława, within Iława County, Warmian-Masurian Voivodeship, in northern Poland.

== Notable residents ==
- Emil Adolf von Behring (1854–1917), Nobel laureate, discovered a diphtheria antitoxin
