= Marienwerder (district) =

Former district of Prussia

Marienwerder district Landkreis Marienwerder
- Former subdivision of Prussia
- 1752–1945
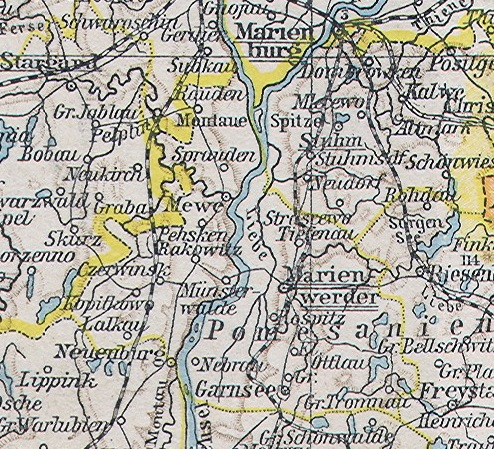
- Borders of the Marienwerder district, 1818-1920
- Capital: Marienwerder
- Demonym: Pomeranians, Poles, Kocievians
- Area transferred
  - 1920: Areas of Kociewie to Pomeranian Voivodeship
  - Type: Monarchy
- Seal
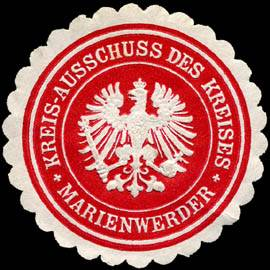
- Historical era: Modern
  - First Partition of Poland: 1752
  - Potsdam Conference: 1945
- Contained within
  - Kingdom of Prussia: East Prussia
  - Kingdom of Prussia: West Prussia
  - Kingdom of Prussia: Marienwerder Region
  - Weimar Republic: Free State of Prussia
  - Nazi Germany: Reichsgau Danzig-West Prussia
- Today part of: Poland

Landkreis Marienwerder was a Kreis, or district, of Prussia from 1752 to 1945. Its capital was Marienwerder (today Kwidzyn).

== History ==
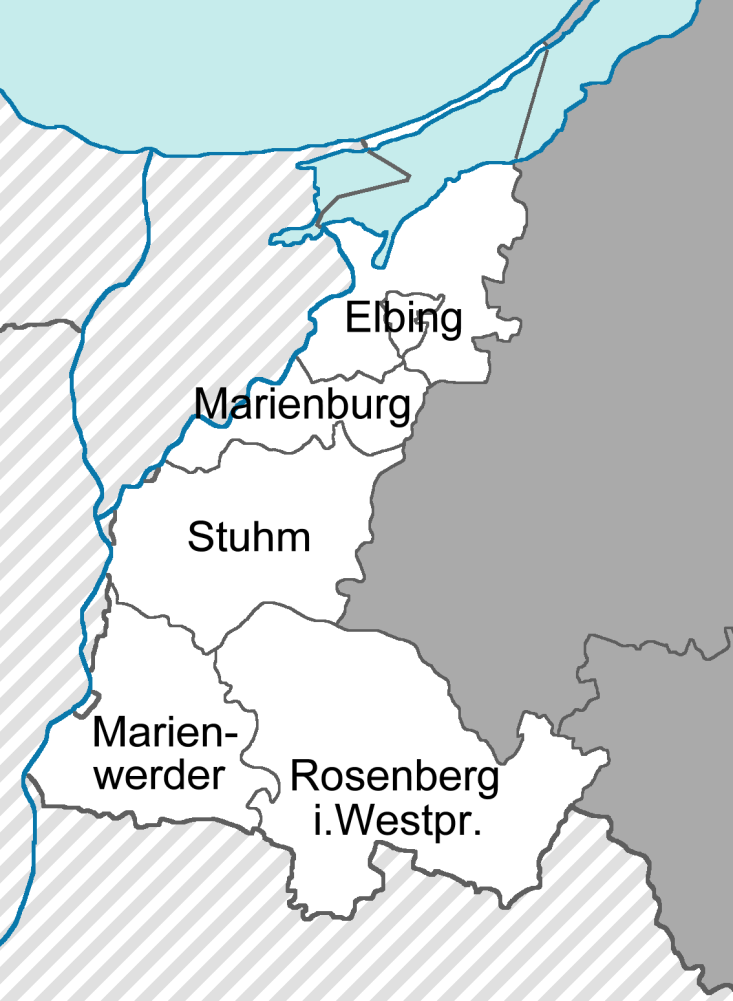
Marienwerder district among the other districts within the Region of West Prussia (1922–1939)

King Frederick the Great of Prussia created Kreis Marienwerder as one of ten districts in an administrative reorganization of East Prussia (the former Duchy of Prussia) in 1752. After the king annexed most of Polish Royal Prussia in the 1772 First Partition of Poland, Marienwerder became a seat of government of the newly created Province of West Prussia in 1773. After the Napoleonic Wars, Kreis Marienwerder was included within the Marienwerder Region of West Prussia in 1816. This government region consisted of territory east and west of the Vistula River. In 1818, the new Rosenberg district and the town of Rosenberg were detached from Kreis Marienwerder. The older district was compensated with a few communities to the west of the Vistula.

As a result of World War I, the Treaty of Versailles allocated most of West Prussia to the Second Polish Republic (as the Polish Corridor) or the independent Free City of Danzig. On 10 January 1920, all of Kreis Marienwerder's territory west of the Vistula became part of Poland. The territory east of the river was first administered by the governor of the Region of Königsberg. In a plebiscite on 11 July 1920, the inhabitants of the district voted to remain in the Free State of Prussia within the Weimar Republic. Außendeich, Johannisdorf, Kleinfelde, Kramershof, and Neu Liebenau, communities east of the Vistula, became part of Poland on 12 August, however. On 1 July 1922, Kreis Marienwerder was formally incorporated into the Prussian Province of East Prussia. The Marienwerder Region was renamed Region of West Prussia (Regierungsbezirk Westpreußen), while the regional president's seat remained in the town of Marienwerder.

In 1933, 65% of the district's population outside of the city of Marienwerder engaged in agriculture. On 1 January 1939, Kreis Marienwerder was renamed Landkreis Marienwerder, in accordance with a statewide ruling.

World War II began on September 1 with the Invasion of Poland. On 26 October, the district became part of the newly created Reichsgau Westpreußen, the later Reichsgau Danzig-West Prussia. Regierungsbezirk Westpreußen was renamed to its original designation, Regierungsbezirk Marienwerder. The previously Polish communities of Burztych (Außendeich), Janowo (Johannisdorf), Kramrowo (Kramersdorf), Male Polko (Kleinfelde), and Nowe Lignowy (Neu Liebenau) were included within Landkreis Dirschau after their conquest at the beginning of the war. Retroactive to 26 October 1939, the communities were included within Landkreis Marienwerder on 2 December 1940.

In early 1945, the Marienwerder district was liberated by Allied soldiers of the Red Army. As a result of the post-war Potsdam Conference, the district was placed under Polish administration and the German inhabitants were subsequently expelled westward. The district was then dissolved and its territory was made part of the Olsztyn Voivodeship in Poland.

== Demographics ==
The district had a German majority population, along with a large Polish minority.

Ethnolinguistic structure of the Marienwerder district
	1849		1852		1905	
German	39,564	69.8%	40,778	69.1%	42,699	62.7%
Polish / Bilingual / Other	17,083	30.2%	18,223	30.9%	25,397	37.3%
Total	56,647		59,001		68,096	
