= Młynisko =

Młynisko may refer to the following places:

- Młynisko, Greater Poland Voivodeship (west-central Poland)
- Młynisko, Łódź Voivodeship (central Poland)
- Młynisko, Masovian Voivodeship (east-central Poland)
- Młynisko, Pomeranian Voivodeship (north Poland)
