= Republic of Gniew =

Former Central European state

Republic of Gniew Republika Gniewska (Polish)
- 1919–1920
- Capital: Gniew
- Common languages: Polish; German
- Religion: Catholicism; Lutheranism; Judaism
- Government: Republic
  - President: Franciszek Czarnowski
- Historical era: Aftermath of World War I
  - Established: 7 July 1919
  - Disestablished: 16 August 1920
| Preceded by | Succeeded by |
| Free State of Prussia | Second Polish Republic |
- Today part of: Poland

The Republic of Gniew (Polish: Republika Gniewska) was a state established on 7 July 1919 in the town of Gniew in the aftermath of World War I. The city-state had a functioning legislature and executive, alongside a volunteer paramilitary force.

== Background ==
Following the end of World War I, the Republic of Poland was founded. However, the lands around the town of Gniew remained under the administration of the Free State of Prussia. On 18 November 1918, Polish activists, including Aleksander Kupczyński and Franciszek Czarnowski, established a People's Council in Gniew, which began to agitate for the area to become part of the new Polish state. In response, Grenschutz Ost paramilitary units, led by Gerhard Roßbach, were sent to the area to quell Polish activism.

== Establishment ==
Uncertain about the future prospects of joining Poland, the residents of Gniew organized a people's militia on 7 July 1919, which became the founding date of the Republic of Gniew. Czarnowski became President of the de facto independent Republic, which covered an area of 430 km² incorporating 102 settlements. On 28 June 1919, the Treaty of Versailles was finalized, stipulating that the town of Gniew would become part of the Republic of Poland. The situation remained uncertain with continued oppression and requisitions by the Grenschutz Ost.

== Dissolution ==
In accordance with the terms of the Treaty of Versailles, the areas of the Republic on the left bank of the Vistula were incorporated into the Second Polish Republic. On 27 January 1920, Polish troops under the command of Józef Haller entered the town of Gniew to the sound of the Mazurek Dąbrowskiego and were joined by 400 members of the People's Guard. The remaining areas of the Republic located on the right bank of the Vistula, covering the villages of Bursztych, Kramrowo, Nowe Lignowy, and Pólko Małe, were finally incorporated into the Second Polish Republic on 16 August 1920 as a result of the East Prussian Plebiscite.

== Interpretation ==
In the German historiography, less emphasis has been placed on the nationalist character of the Republic of Gniew. Instead, the workers' and soldiers' councils formed in Gniew have been placed within the broader context of the November Revolution.

The Republic of Gniew was typical of what the historian Tomasz Kamusella has described as "an entire avalanche of such shortlived polities" that emerged from wars in Central and Eastern Europe between 1908 and 1924. He views the nationalist project of many of these states as experiments in new forms of governance in the face of disruptive conflict.

== Legacy ==
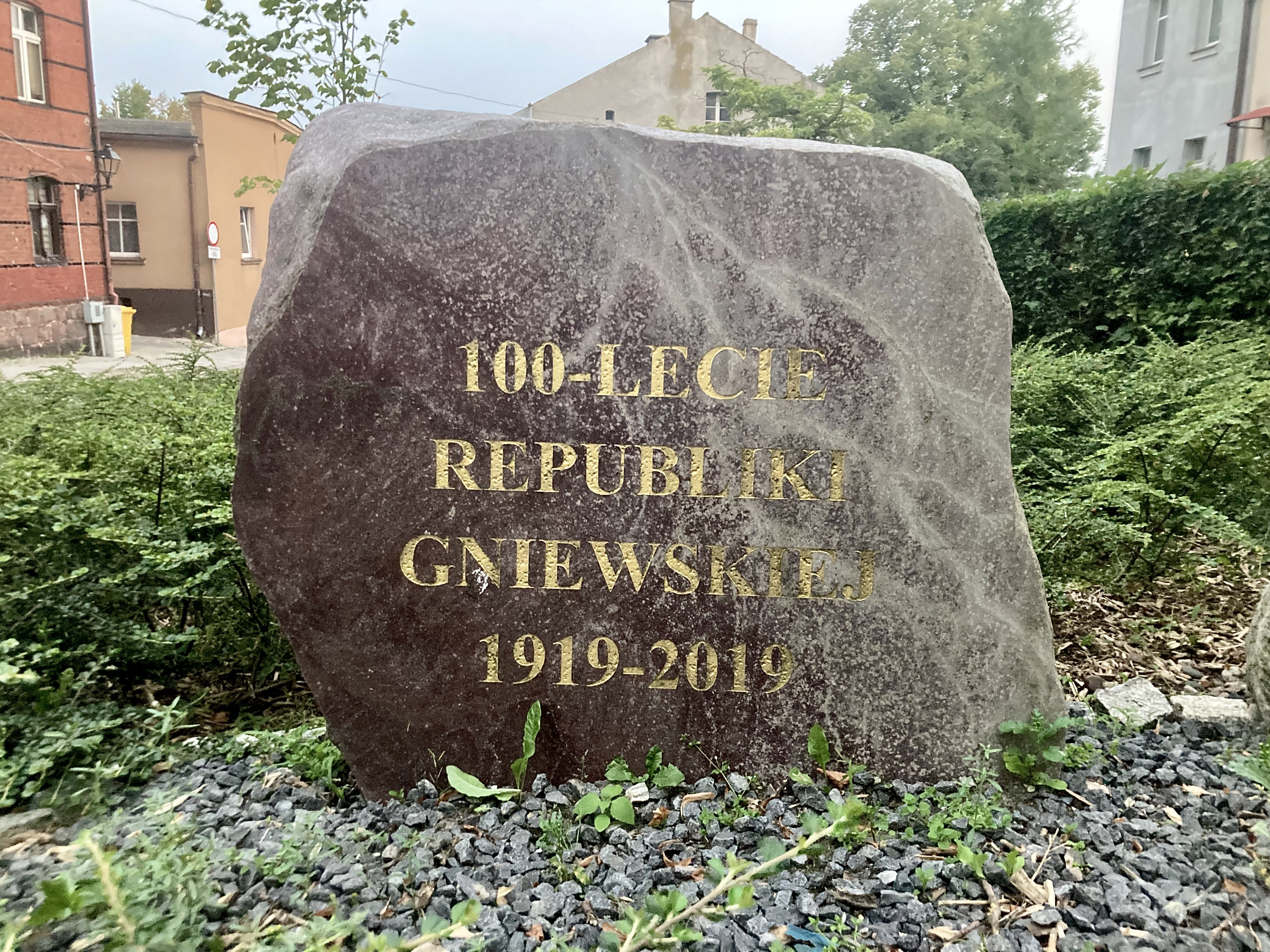
Memorial stone commemorating the hundredth anniversary of the Republic of Gniew

In 2018, the mayor of Gniew passed a resolution to create a public company named Republika Gniewska in order to promote tourism in the town. In commemoration of the 100th anniversary of its establishment, 2019 was declared the Year of the Republic of Gniew by the Gniew council. The commemorations included an interactive city game organized by the local University of the Third Age, historical lectures, an exhibition, imitation passports, renditions of the national anthem and Dean Martin's Sway (in reference to a letter written by the inhabitants of the Republic to President Woodrow Wilson). A public memorial was also unveiled in the town.

== See also ==
- First Republic of Pińczów
- Komańcza Republic
- Lemko Republic
- Republic of Ostrów
- Republic of Tarnobrzeg
- Republic of Zakopane
- Sejny Uprising
