= Republic of Pińczów =

Republic of Pińczów may refer to:

- First Republic of Pińczów, established in 1918 during World War I
- Second Republic of Pińczów, established in 1944 during Operation Tempest
