= Jurandowo, Pomeranian Voivodeship =

Jurandowo
- Settlement
- Location within Poland
- Coordinates: 53°45′6″N 19°6′12″E
- Country: Poland
- Voivodeship: Pomeranian
- County: Kwidzyn
- Gmina: Kwidzyn

Jurandowo [juranˈdɔvɔ] is a settlement in the administrative district of Gmina Kwidzyn, within Kwidzyn County, Pomeranian Voivodeship, in northern Poland.

For the history of the region, see History of Pomerania.
