= Pastwa =

- Village
- Location within Poland
- Coordinates: 53°48′3″N 18°52′25″E
- Country: Poland
- Voivodeship: Pomeranian
- County: Kwidzyn
- Gmina: Kwidzyn
- Population: 282

Pastwa [ˈpastfa] is a village in the administrative district of Gmina Kwidzyn, within Kwidzyn County, Pomeranian Voivodeship, in northern Poland.

== History ==
In 1854 a Mennonite congregation was founded in Pastwa, it effectively ended in 1914 with the start of the First World War, before then many of the village's Mennonite inhabitants fled to Russia and later Latin America to avoid the draft, and many have remained to this day.

The area bordered the Polish corridor to the West from 1918 to 1939. During the Invasion of Poland, a small garrison was placed in the village who joined the attack on Gniew. For the history of the region, see History of Pomerania.
