= Olszanica, Pomeranian Voivodeship =

Olszanica
- Village
- Location within Poland
- Coordinates: 53°40′47″N 18°50′43″E
- Country: Poland
- Voivodeship: Pomeranian
- County: Kwidzyn
- Gmina: Sadlinki
- Population (2022): 442

Olszanica [ɔlʂaˈɲit͡sa] is a village in the administrative district of Gmina Sadlinki, within Kwidzyn County, Pomeranian Voivodeship, in northern Poland.

For the history of the region, see History of Pomerania.
