= Wiśliny =

- Village
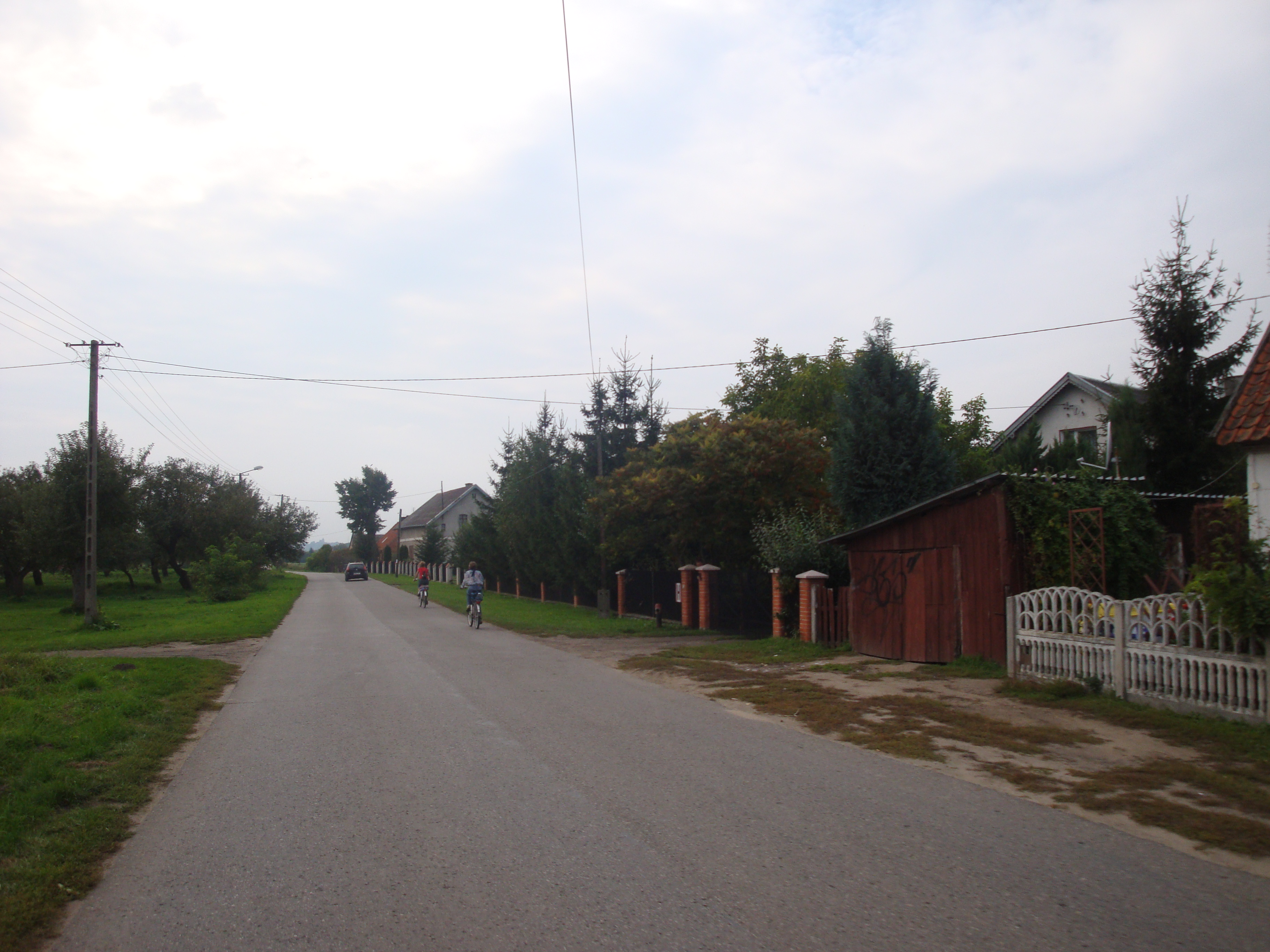

- Location within Poland
- Coordinates: 53°39′57″N 18°46′20″E
- Country: Poland
- Voivodeship: Pomeranian
- County: Kwidzyn
- Gmina: Sadlinki
- Population (2022): 270

Wiśliny [viˈɕlinɨ] is a village in the administrative district of Gmina Sadlinki, within Kwidzyn County, Pomeranian Voivodeship, in northern Poland.

For the history of the region, see History of Pomerania.
