= Stańkowo =

- Village
- Location within Poland
- Coordinates: 53°44′25″N 19°15′10″E
- Country: Poland
- Voivodeship: Pomeranian
- County: Kwidzyn
- Gmina: Prabuty
- Population: 320

Stańkowo ([staɲˈkɔvɔ]) (German: Riesenwalde) is a village in the administrative district of Gmina Prabuty, within Kwidzyn County, Pomeranian Voivodeship, in northern Poland.

For the history of the region, see History of Pomerania.
