= Nowy Dwór, Kwidzyn County =

Nowy Dwór
- Village
- Location within Poland
- Coordinates: 53°43′17″N 18°52′21″E
- Country: Poland
- Voivodeship: Pomeranian
- County: Kwidzyn
- Gmina: Kwidzyn
- Population: 327

Nowy Dwór [ˈnɔvɨ ˈdvur] is a village in the administrative district of Gmina Kwidzyn, within Kwidzyn County, Pomeranian Voivodeship, in northern Poland.

For the history of the region, see History of Pomerania.
