= Pałatyki =

- Settlement
- Location within Poland
- Coordinates: 53°43′44″N 19°15′15″E
- Country: Poland
- Voivodeship: Pomeranian
- County: Kwidzyn
- Gmina: Prabuty
- Population: 0

Pałatyki [pawaˈtɨki] is a former settlement in the administrative district of Gmina Prabuty, within Kwidzyn County, Pomeranian Voivodeship, in northern Poland.

For the history of the region, see History of Pomerania.
