= Kołodzieje, Kwidzyn County =

Kołodzieje
- Village
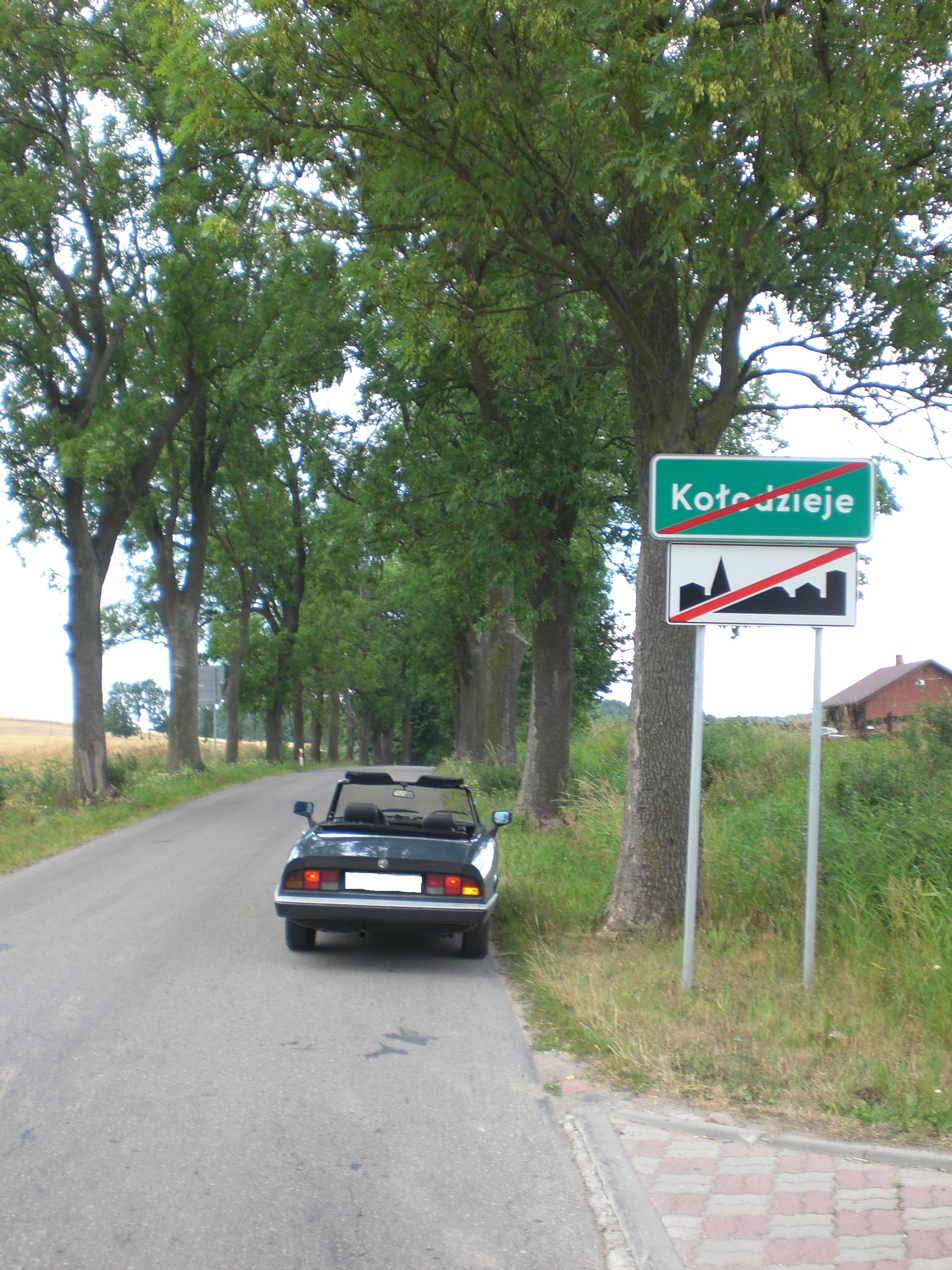

- Location within Poland
- Coordinates: 53°43′N 19°11′E
- Country: Poland
- Voivodeship: Pomeranian
- County: Kwidzyn
- Gmina: Prabuty
- Population: 250

Kołodzieje [kɔwɔˈd͡ʑɛjɛ] is a village in the administrative district of Gmina Prabuty, within Kwidzyn County, Pomeranian Voivodeship, in northern Poland.

For the history of the region, see History of Pomerania.
