= Sypanica =

- Village
- Location within Poland
- Coordinates: 53°47′18″N 19°8′58″E
- Country: Poland
- Voivodeship: Pomeranian
- County: Kwidzyn
- Gmina: Prabuty
- Population: 260

Sypanica [sɨpaˈnit͡sa] is a village in the administrative district of Gmina Prabuty, within Kwidzyn County, Pomeranian Voivodeship, in northern Poland.

For the history of the region, see History of Pomerania.
