= Pole Rakowieckie =

- Village
- Location within Poland
- Coordinates: 53°45′4″N 19°1′53″E
- Country: Poland
- Voivodeship: Pomeranian
- County: Kwidzyn
- Gmina: Kwidzyn
- Population: 27

Pole Rakowieckie [ˈpɔlɛ rakɔˈvjɛt͡skʲɛ] is a village in the administrative district of Gmina Kwidzyn, within Kwidzyn County, Pomeranian Voivodeship, in northern Poland.

For the history of the region, see History of Pomerania.
