= Laskowicki Tartak =

- Settlement
- Location within Poland
- Coordinates: 53°47′46″N 19°6′15″E
- Country: Poland
- Voivodeship: Pomeranian
- County: Kwidzyn
- Gmina: Prabuty

Laskowicki Tartak [laskɔˈvit͡ski ˈtartak] is a settlement in the administrative district of Gmina Prabuty, within Kwidzyn County, Pomeranian Voivodeship, in northern Poland.

For the history of the region, see History of Pomerania.
