= Szałwinek =

- Village
- Location within Poland
- Coordinates: 53°50′36″N 18°52′22″E
- Country: Poland
- Voivodeship: Pomeranian
- County: Kwidzyn
- Gmina: Kwidzyn
- Population: 160

Szałwinek [ʂau̯ˈvinɛk] is a village in the administrative district of Gmina Kwidzyn, within Kwidzyn County, Pomeranian Voivodeship, in northern Poland.

== History ==
For the history of the region, see History of Pomerania.
