= Glina, Pomeranian Voivodeship =

Glina
- Village
- Location within Poland
- Coordinates: 53°38′4″N 18°46′37″E
- Country: Poland
- Voivodeship: Pomeranian
- County: Kwidzyn
- Gmina: Sadlinki
- Population (2022): 249

Glina [ˈɡlina] is a village in the administrative district of Gmina Sadlinki, within Kwidzyn County, Pomeranian Voivodeship, in northern Poland.
