= Rakowiec, Kwidzyn County =

Rakowiec
- Village
- Location within Poland
- Coordinates: 53°43′39″N 19°1′18″E
- Country: Poland
- Voivodeship: Pomeranian
- County: Kwidzyn
- Gmina: Kwidzyn
- Elevation: 89 m (292 ft)
- Population: 1,328

Rakowiec [raˈkɔvjɛt͡s] is a village in the administrative district of Gmina Kwidzyn, within Kwidzyn County, Pomeranian Voivodeship, in northern Poland.

For the history of the region, see History of Pomerania.
