= Stary Dwór, Kwidzyn County =

Stary Dwór
- Settlement
- Location within Poland
- Coordinates: 53°55′50″N 19°10′41″E
- Country: Poland
- Voivodeship: Pomeranian
- County: Kwidzyn
- Gmina: Kwidzyn

Stary Dwór [ˈstarɨ ˈdvur] is a settlement in the administrative district of Gmina Kwidzyn, within Kwidzyn County, Pomeranian Voivodeship, in northern Poland.

== See also ==
- History of Pomerania
