= Tychnowy =

- Village
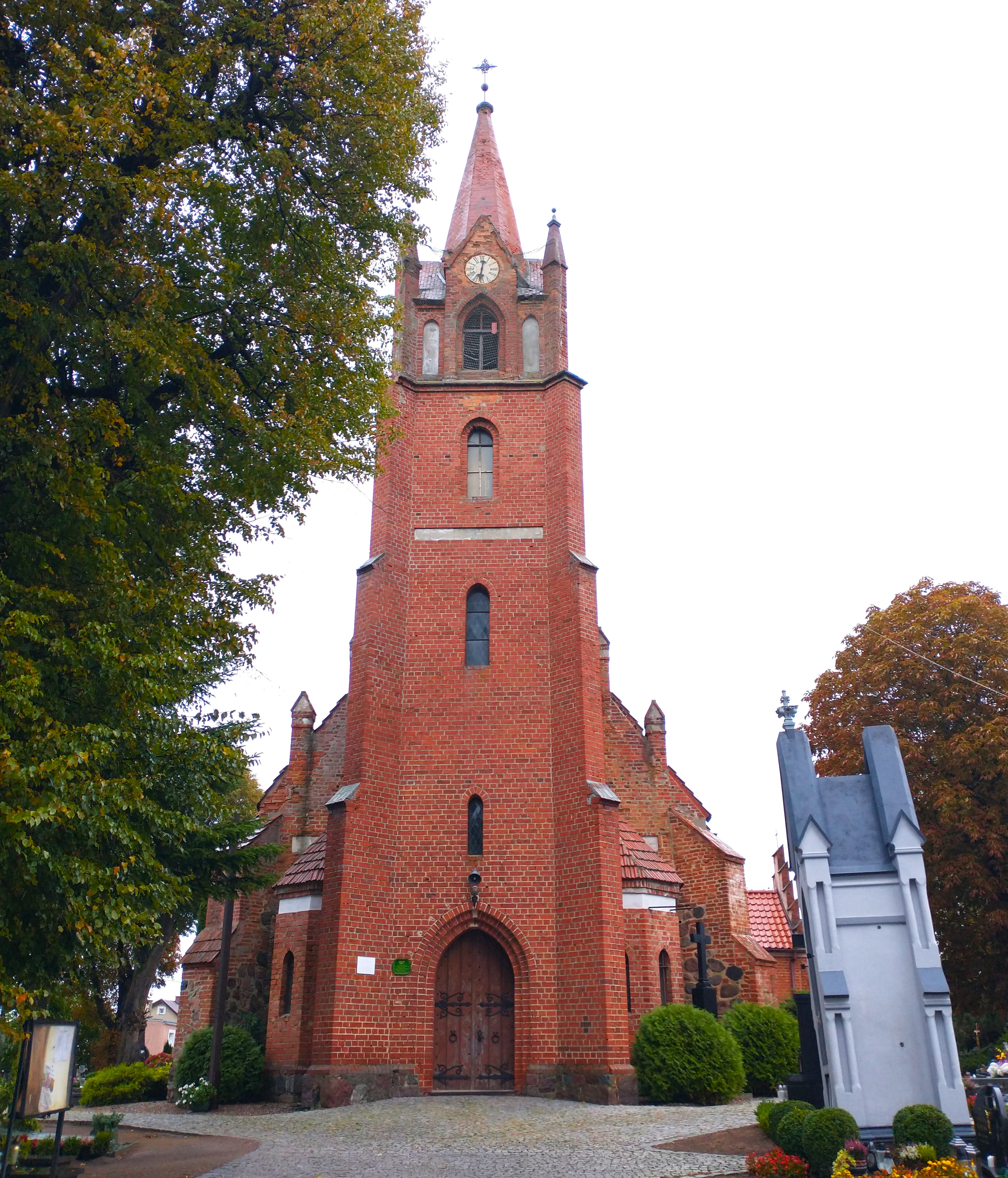
- Saint George and Providence of God church, Tychnowy

- Location within Poland
- Coordinates: 53°46′49″N 18°57′30″E
- Country: Poland
- Voivodeship: Pomeranian
- County: Kwidzyn
- Gmina: Kwidzyn
- Population: 757

Tychnowy [tɨxˈnɔvɨ] is a village in the administrative district of Gmina Kwidzyn, within Kwidzyn County, Pomeranian Voivodeship, in northern Poland.

For the history of the region, see History of Pomerania.
