= Mareza, Poland =

Mareza
- Village
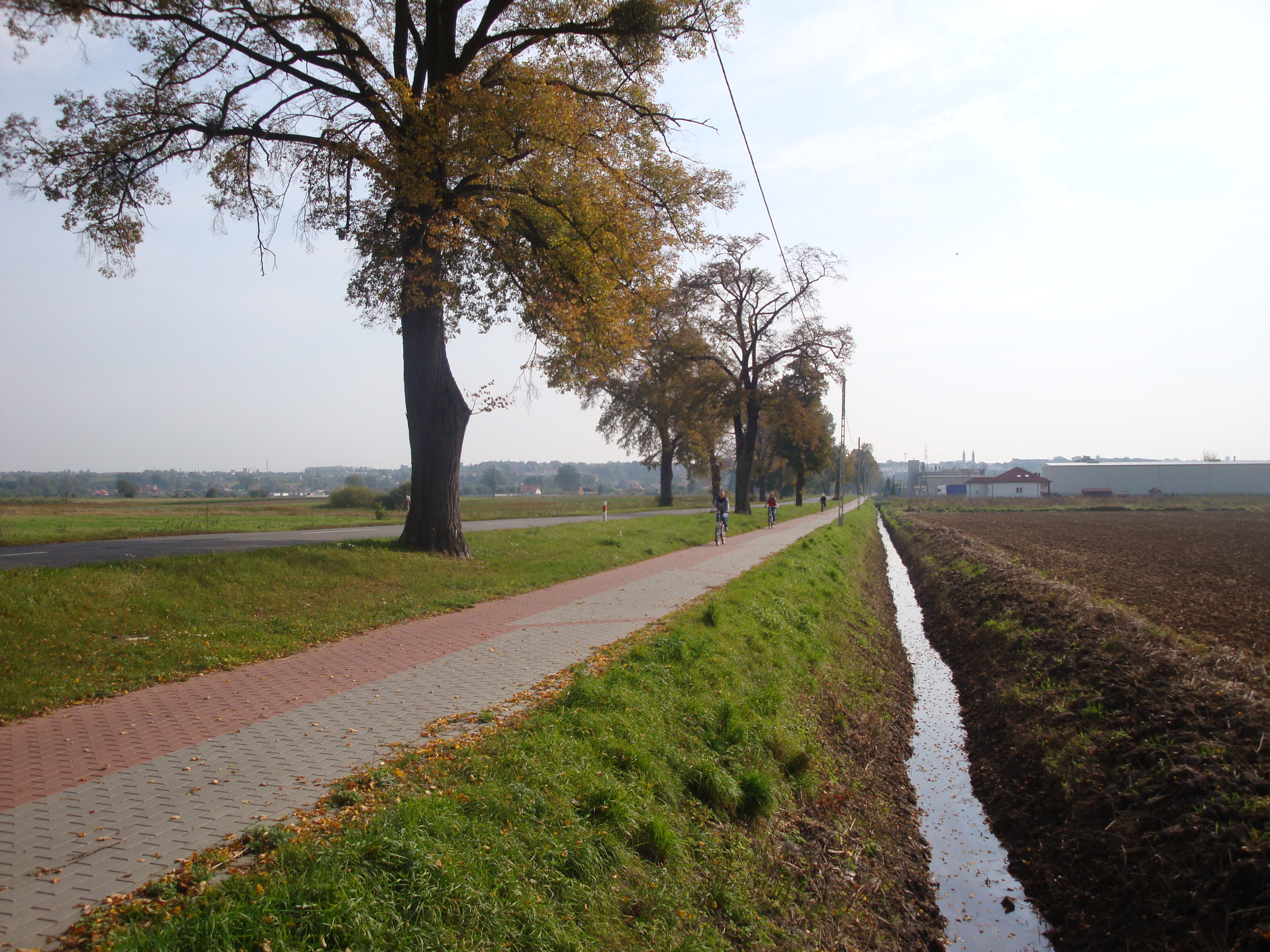
- Korzeniewska Street, bicycle and pedestrian path

- Location within Poland
- Coordinates: 53°44′12″N 18°54′54″E
- Country: Poland
- Voivodeship: Pomeranian
- County: Kwidzyn
- Gmina: Kwidzyn
- Population (2021): 1,293

Mareza [maˈrɛza] is a village in the administrative district of Gmina Kwidzyn, within Kwidzyn County, Pomeranian Voivodeship, in northern Poland.

For the history of the region, see History of Pomerania.
