= Rakowice, Pomeranian Voivodeship =

Rakowice
- Village
- Location within Poland
- Coordinates: 53°42′39″N 19°0′16″E
- Country: Poland
- Voivodeship: Pomeranian
- County: Kwidzyn
- Gmina: Kwidzyn
- Population: 94

Rakowice [rakɔˈvit͡sɛ] is a village in the administrative district of Gmina Kwidzyn, within Kwidzyn County, Pomeranian Voivodeship, in northern Poland.

For the history of the region, see History of Pomerania.
