= Górowychy =

- Village
- Location within Poland
- Coordinates: 53°47′35″N 19°12′53″E
- Country: Poland
- Voivodeship: Pomeranian
- County: Kwidzyn
- Gmina: Prabuty

Population
  - Total: 146 (2,011)

Górowychy [ɡurɔˈvɨxɨ] is a village in the administrative district of Gmina Prabuty, within Kwidzyn County, Pomeranian Voivodeship, in northern Poland.

For the history of the region, see History of Pomerania.
