= Gilwa Mała =

- Village
- Location within Poland
- Coordinates: 53°43′29″N 19°7′55″E
- Country: Poland
- Voivodeship: Pomeranian
- County: Kwidzyn
- Gmina: Kwidzyn
- Population: 40

Gilwa Mała [ˈɡilva ˈmawa] is a village in the administrative district of Gmina Kwidzyn, within Kwidzyn County, Pomeranian Voivodeship, in northern Poland.

For the history of the region, see History of Pomerania.
