= Trumiejki =

- Village
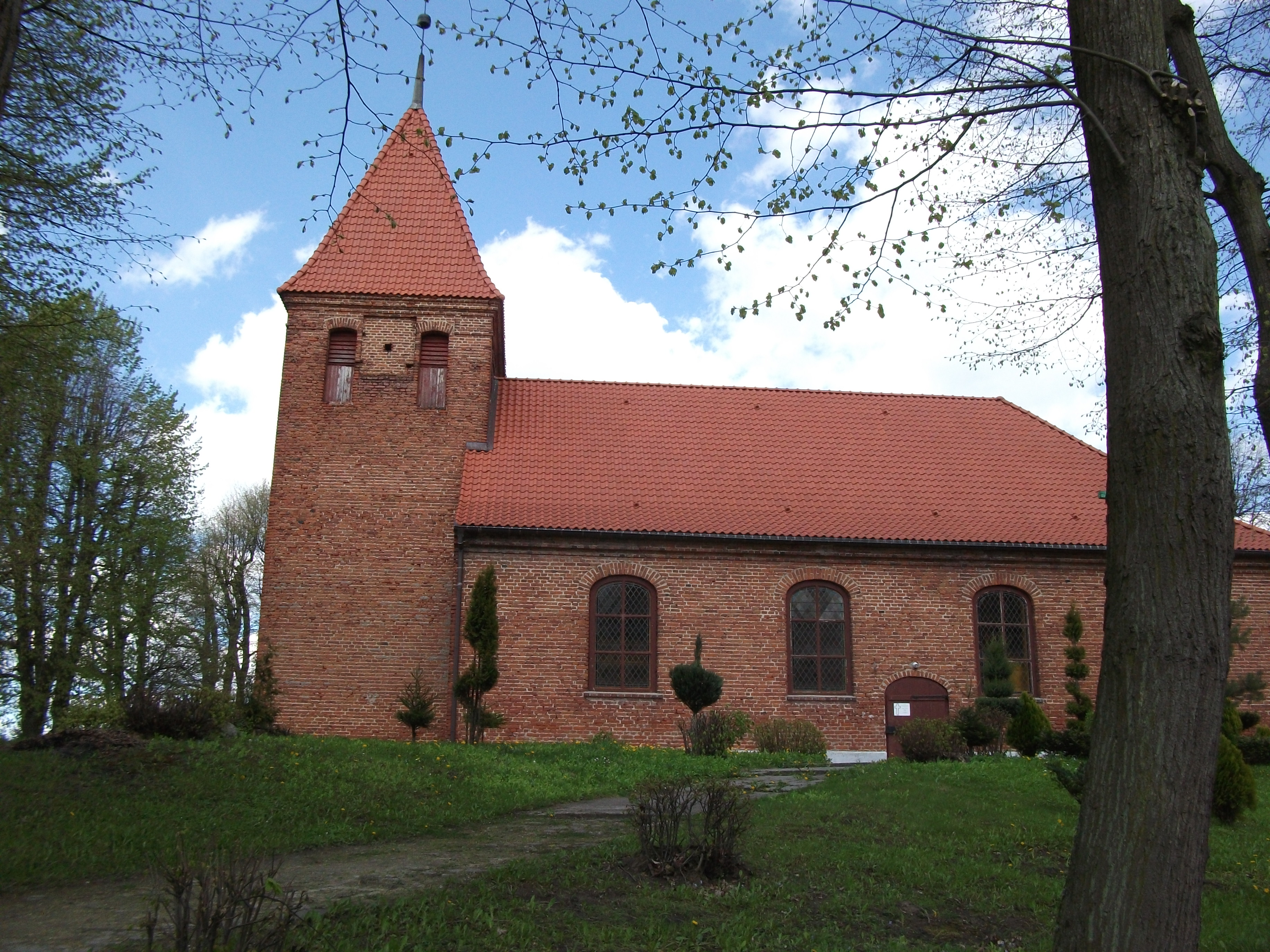
- The Village of Trumiejski, Poland

- Location within Poland
- Coordinates: 53°40′35″N 19°10′9″E
- Country: Poland
- Voivodeship: Pomeranian
- County: Kwidzyn
- Gmina: Prabuty
- Population: 360

Trumiejki [truˈmjɛi̯ki] is a village in the administrative district of Gmina Prabuty, within Kwidzyn County, Pomeranian Voivodeship, in northern Poland.

== See also ==
- History of Pomerania
