= Gonty =

- Village
- Location within Poland
- Coordinates: 53°47′4″N 19°10′41″E
- Country: Poland
- Voivodeship: Pomeranian
- County: Kwidzyn
- Gmina: Prabuty
- Population: 230

Gonty [ˈɡɔntɨ] is a village in the administrative district of Gmina Prabuty, within Kwidzyn County, Pomeranian Voivodeship, in northern Poland.

For the history of the region, see History of Pomerania.
