= Dubiel =

- Village
- Location within Poland
- Coordinates: 53°47′44″N 19°1′0″E
- Country: Poland
- Voivodeship: Pomeranian
- County: Kwidzyn
- Gmina: Kwidzyn
- Population: 203

Dubiel [ˈdubjɛl] is a village in the administrative district of Gmina Kwidzyn, within Kwidzyn County, Pomeranian Voivodeship, in northern Poland.

Before 1772 the area was part of Kingdom of Poland, in 1772-1945 it belonged to Prussia and Germany, and in 1945 returned to Poland. For the history of the region, see History of Pomerania.
