= Krążkowo, Pomeranian Voivodeship =

Krążkowo
- Village
- Location within Poland
- Coordinates: 53°38′9″N 18°49′49″E
- Country: Poland
- Voivodeship: Pomeranian
- County: Kwidzyn
- Gmina: Sadlinki

Krążkowo [krɔ̃ʂˈkɔvɔ] is a village in the administrative district of Gmina Sadlinki, within Kwidzyn County, Pomeranian Voivodeship, in northern Poland.
