= Obrzynowo =

- Village
- Location within Poland
- Coordinates: 53°46′44″N 19°15′40″E
- Country: Poland
- Voivodeship: Pomeranian
- County: Kwidzyn
- Gmina: Prabuty
- Population: 710
- Website: http://www.spobrzynowo.neostrada.pl/spob.html

Obrzynowo [ɔbʐɨˈnɔvɔ] is a village in the administrative district of Gmina Prabuty, within Kwidzyn County, Pomeranian Voivodeship, in northern Poland.

For the history of the region, see History of Pomerania.
