= Pachutki =

- Village
- Location within Poland
- Coordinates: 53°48′39″N 19°18′29″E
- Country: Poland
- Voivodeship: Pomeranian
- County: Kwidzyn
- Gmina: Prabuty
- Population: 20

Pachutki [paˈxutki] is a village in the administrative district of Gmina Prabuty, within Kwidzyn County, Pomeranian Voivodeship, in northern Poland.

For the history of the region, see History of Pomerania.
