= Bronno, Pomeranian Voivodeship =

Bronno
- Village
- Location within Poland
- Coordinates: 53°43′26″N 19°5′15″E
- Country: Poland
- Voivodeship: Pomeranian
- County: Kwidzyn
- Gmina: Kwidzyn
- Population: 280

Bronno [ˈbrɔnnɔ] is a village in the administrative district of Gmina Kwidzyn, within Kwidzyn County, Pomeranian Voivodeship, in northern Poland.

For the history of the region, see History of Pomerania.
