= Stary Kamień, Pomeranian Voivodeship =

Stary Kamień
- Village
- Location within Poland
- Coordinates: 53°43′57″N 19°12′38″E
- Country: Poland
- Voivodeship: Pomeranian
- County: Kwidzyn
- Gmina: Prabuty

Stary Kamień (Polish pronunciation: [ˈstarɨ ˈkamjɛj̃]) is a village in the administrative district of Gmina Prabuty, within Kwidzyn County, Pomeranian Voivodeship, in northern Poland.

For the history of the region, see History of Pomerania.
