= Kółeczko =

- Village
- Location within Poland
- Coordinates: 53°39′47″N 18°51′49″E
- Country: Poland
- Voivodeship: Pomeranian
- County: Kwidzyn
- Gmina: Sadlinki

Kółeczko [kuˈwɛt͡ʂkɔ] is a village in the administrative district of Gmina Sadlinki, within Kwidzyn County, Pomeranian Voivodeship, in northern Poland.

For the history of the region, see History of Pomerania.
