= Rozpędziny =

- City
- Location within Poland
- Coordinates: 53°42′30″N 18°54′22″E
- Country: Poland
- Voivodeship: Pomeranian
- County: Kwidzyn
- Gmina: Kwidzyn
- Population: 67

Rozpędziny [rɔspɛnˈd͡ʑinɨ] is a village in the administrative district of Gmina Kwidzyn, within Kwidzyn County, Pomeranian Voivodeship, in northern Poland.

For the history of the region, see History of Pomerania.
