= Grabowo, Kwidzyn County =

Grabowo
- Village
- Location within Poland
- Coordinates: 53°41′40″N 18°48′25″E
- Country: Poland
- Voivodeship: Pomeranian
- County: Kwidzyn
- Gmina: Sadlinki
- Population (2022): 139

Grabowo [ɡraˈbɔvɔ] is a village in the administrative district of Gmina Sadlinki, within Kwidzyn County, Pomeranian Voivodeship, in northern Poland.

For the history of the region, see History of Pomerania.
