= Wola-Sosenka =

- Settlement
- Location within Poland
- Coordinates: 53°46′17″N 19°4′47″E
- Country: Poland
- Voivodeship: Pomeranian
- County: Kwidzyn
- Gmina: Kwidzyn
- Population: 16

Wola-Sosenka [ˈvɔla sɔˈsɛnka] is a settlement in the administrative district of Gmina Kwidzyn, within Kwidzyn County, Pomeranian Voivodeship, in northern Poland.

For the history of the region, see History of Pomerania.
