= Lipianki, Pomeranian Voivodeship =

Lipianki
- Village
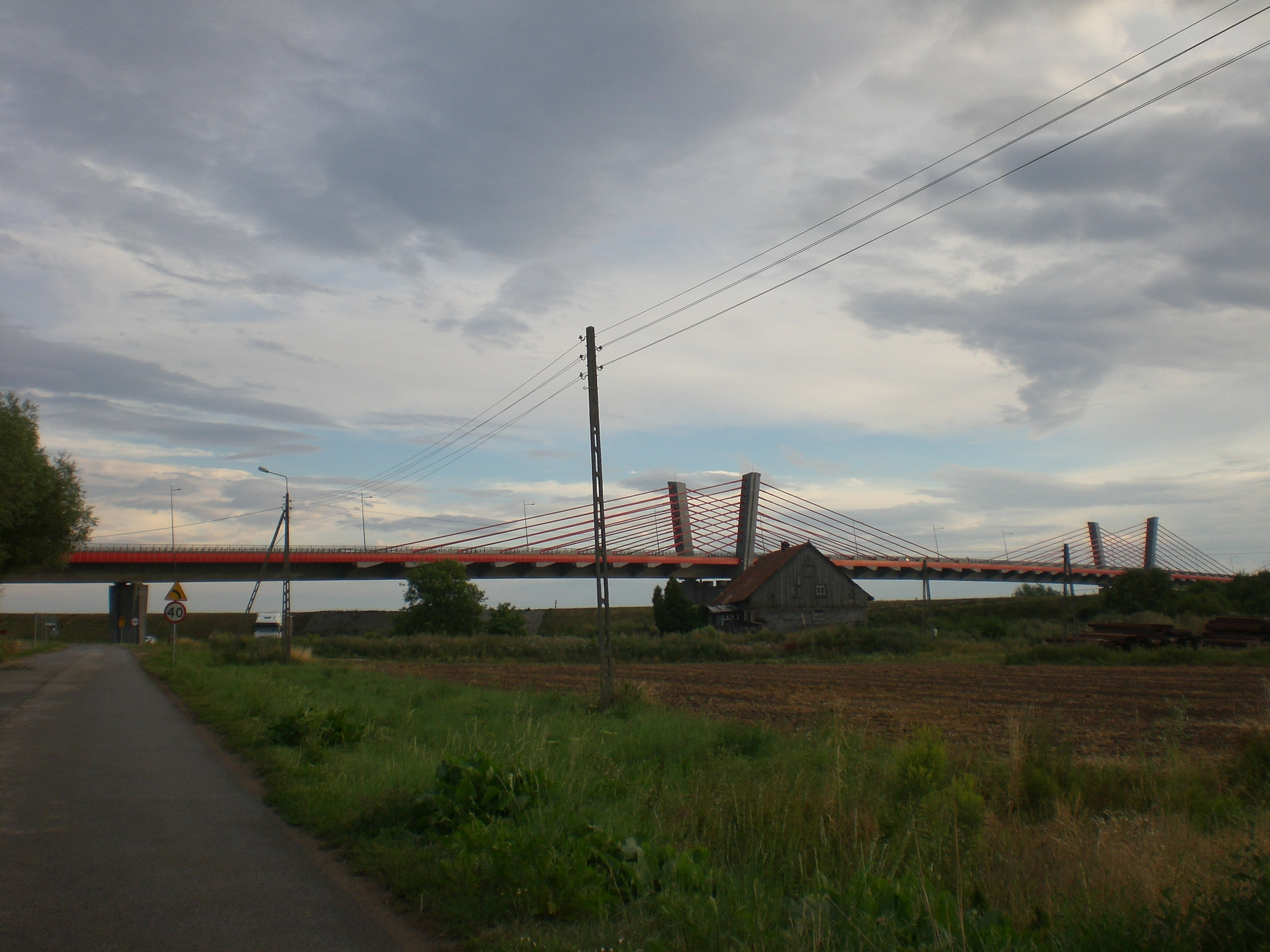

- Location within Poland
- Coordinates: 53°46′21″N 18°51′30″E
- Country: Poland
- Voivodeship: Pomeranian
- County: Kwidzyn
- Gmina: Kwidzyn

Population
  - Total: 229
- Time zone: UTC+1 (CET)
  - Summer (DST): UTC+2 (CEST)

Lipianki [liˈpjanki] is a village in the administrative district of Gmina Kwidzyn, within Kwidzyn County, Pomeranian Voivodeship, in northern Poland.
