= Paczkowo, Pomeranian Voivodeship =

Paczkowo
- Settlement
- Location within Poland
- Coordinates: 53°42′56″N 19°6′23″E
- Country: Poland
- Voivodeship: Pomeranian
- County: Kwidzyn
- Gmina: Kwidzyn
- Population: 0

Paczkowo [pat͡ʂˈkɔvɔ] is a former settlement in the administrative district of Gmina Kwidzyn, within Kwidzyn County, Pomeranian Voivodeship, in northern Poland.

For the history of the region, see History of Pomerania.

== Transport ==
Paczkowo has road connections linking it to local administrative and commercial centers.

Public transportation options are limited, with the nearest major railway station located in Kwidzyn.
