= Podzamcze, Pomeranian Voivodeship =

Podzamcze
- Village
- Location within Poland
- Coordinates: 53°47′9″N 18°55′33″E
- Country: Poland
- Voivodeship: Pomeranian
- County: Kwidzyn
- Gmina: Kwidzyn
- Population: 282

Podzamcze [pɔˈd͡zamt͡ʂɛ] is a village in the administrative district of Gmina Kwidzyn, within Kwidzyn County, Pomeranian Voivodeship, in northern Poland.

For the history of the region, see History of Pomerania.
