= Gdakowo =

- Village
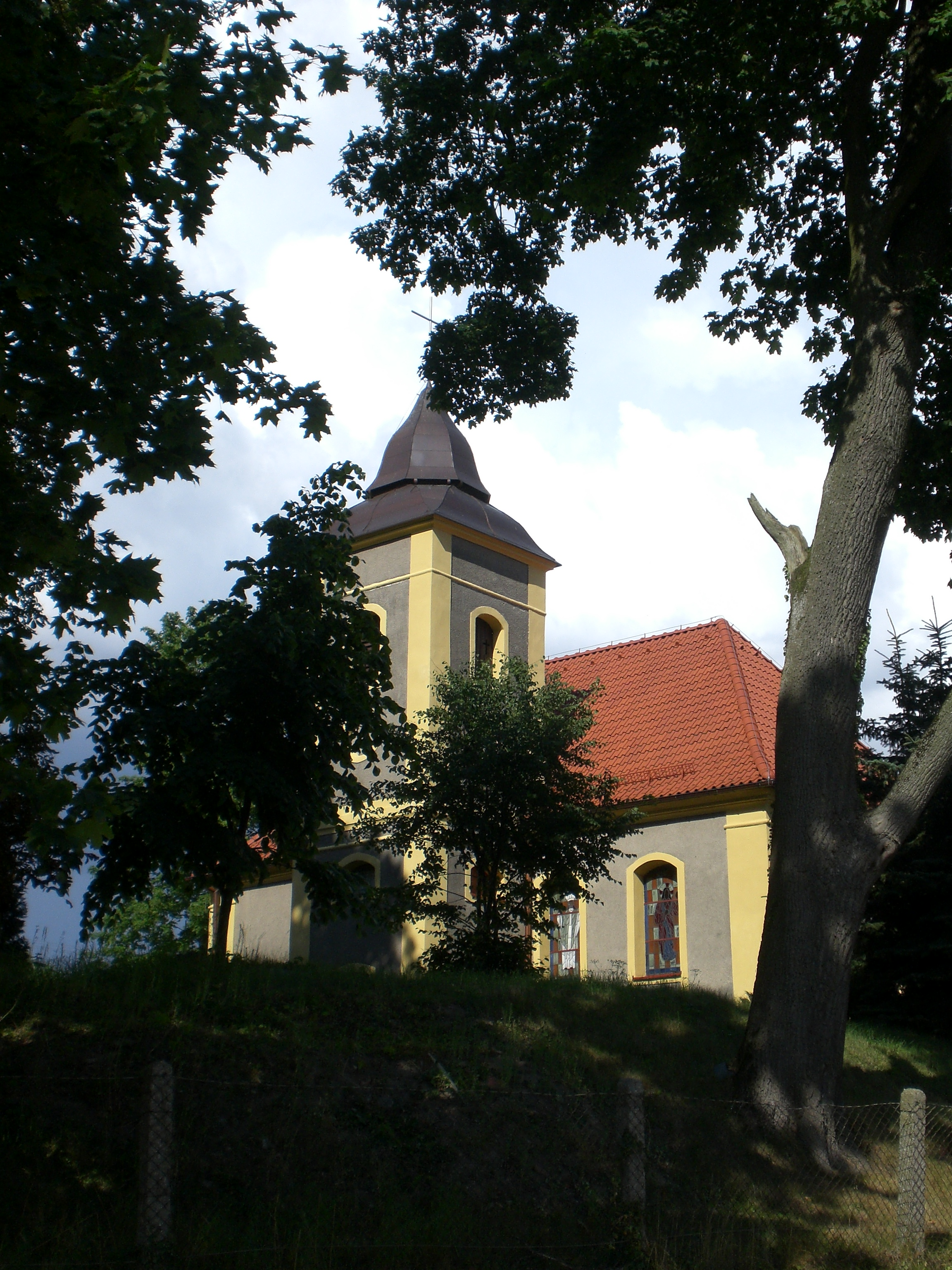
- Baroque Saint Anne church

- Location within Poland
- Coordinates: 53°49′14″N 19°9′26″E
- Country: Poland
- Voivodeship: Pomeranian
- County: Kwidzyn
- Gmina: Prabuty
- Population: 270
- Time zone: UTC+1 (CET)
  - Summer (DST): UTC+2 (CEST)
- Vehicle registration: GKW

Gdakowo [ɡdaˈkɔvɔ] is a village in the administrative district of Gmina Prabuty, within Kwidzyn County, Pomeranian Voivodeship, in northern Poland.

== History ==
The village was part of the Kingdom of Poland until the First Partition of Poland in 1772, when it was annexed by Prussia. In November 1831, several Polish cavalry units of the November Uprising stopped near the village on the way to their internment places. In 1871, the village became part of Germany, and following Germany's defeat in World War II in 1945, it became again part of Poland. The name the village took before returning to Gdakowo was Dakau.

== Transport ==
There is a train station in the village.
