= Rusinowo =

Rusinowo may refer to the following places:

- Rusinowo, Rypin County in Kuyavian-Pomeranian Voivodeship (north-central Poland)
- Rusinowo, Pomeranian Voivodeship (north Poland)
- Rusinowo, Gmina Wałcz in West Pomeranian Voivodeship (north-west Poland)
- Rusinowo, Sławno County in West Pomeranian Voivodeship (north-west Poland)
- Rusinowo, Świdwin County in West Pomeranian Voivodeship (north-west Poland)
- Rusinowo, Gmina Tuczno in West Pomeranian Voivodeship (north-west Poland)
