= Licze =

- Village
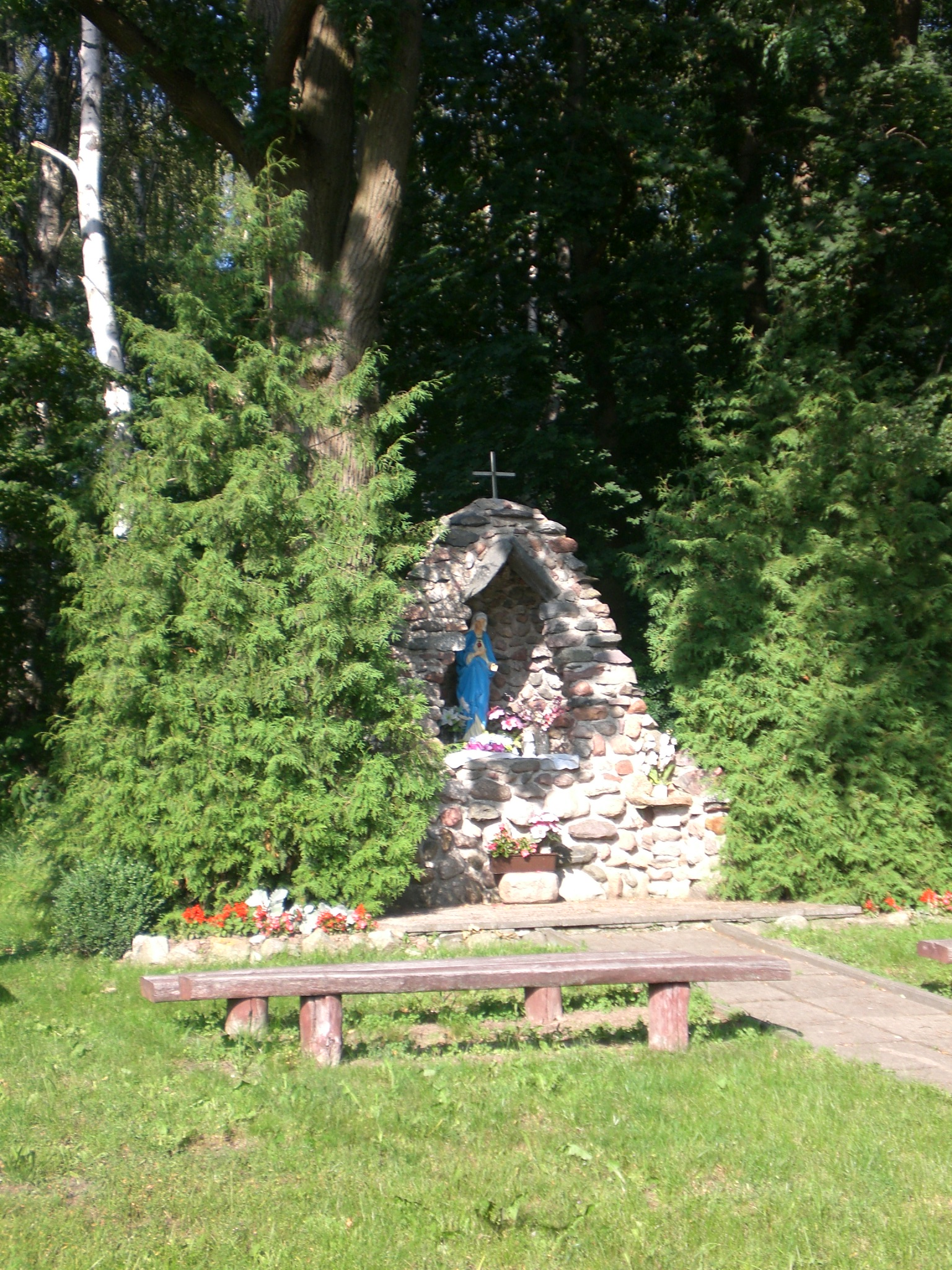
- Wayside shrine in Licze

- Location within Poland
- Coordinates: 53°44′5″N 19°4′19″E
- Country: Poland
- Voivodeship: Pomeranian
- County: Kwidzyn
- Gmina: Kwidzyn
- Population: 522
- Time zone: UTC+1 (CET)
  - Summer (DST): UTC+2 (CEST)
- Vehicle registration: GKW

Licze (Polish pronunciation: [ˈlit͡ʂɛ]) is a village in the administrative district of Gmina Kwidzyn, within Kwidzyn County, Pomeranian Voivodeship, in northern Poland.

During World War II, the German Stalag XX-B prisoner-of-war camp was located in the village for several weeks in December 1939–January 1940, before it was relocated to Wielbark near Malbork.
