= Rodowo Małe =

- Village
- Location within Poland
- Coordinates: 53°48′57″N 19°14′37″E
- Country: Poland
- Voivodeship: Pomeranian
- County: Kwidzyn
- Gmina: Prabuty

Rodowo Małe [rɔˈdɔvɔ ˈmawɛ] is a village in the administrative district of Gmina Prabuty, within Kwidzyn County, Pomeranian Voivodeship, in northern Poland.

== See also ==
- History of Pomerania
