= Kaniczki =

- Village
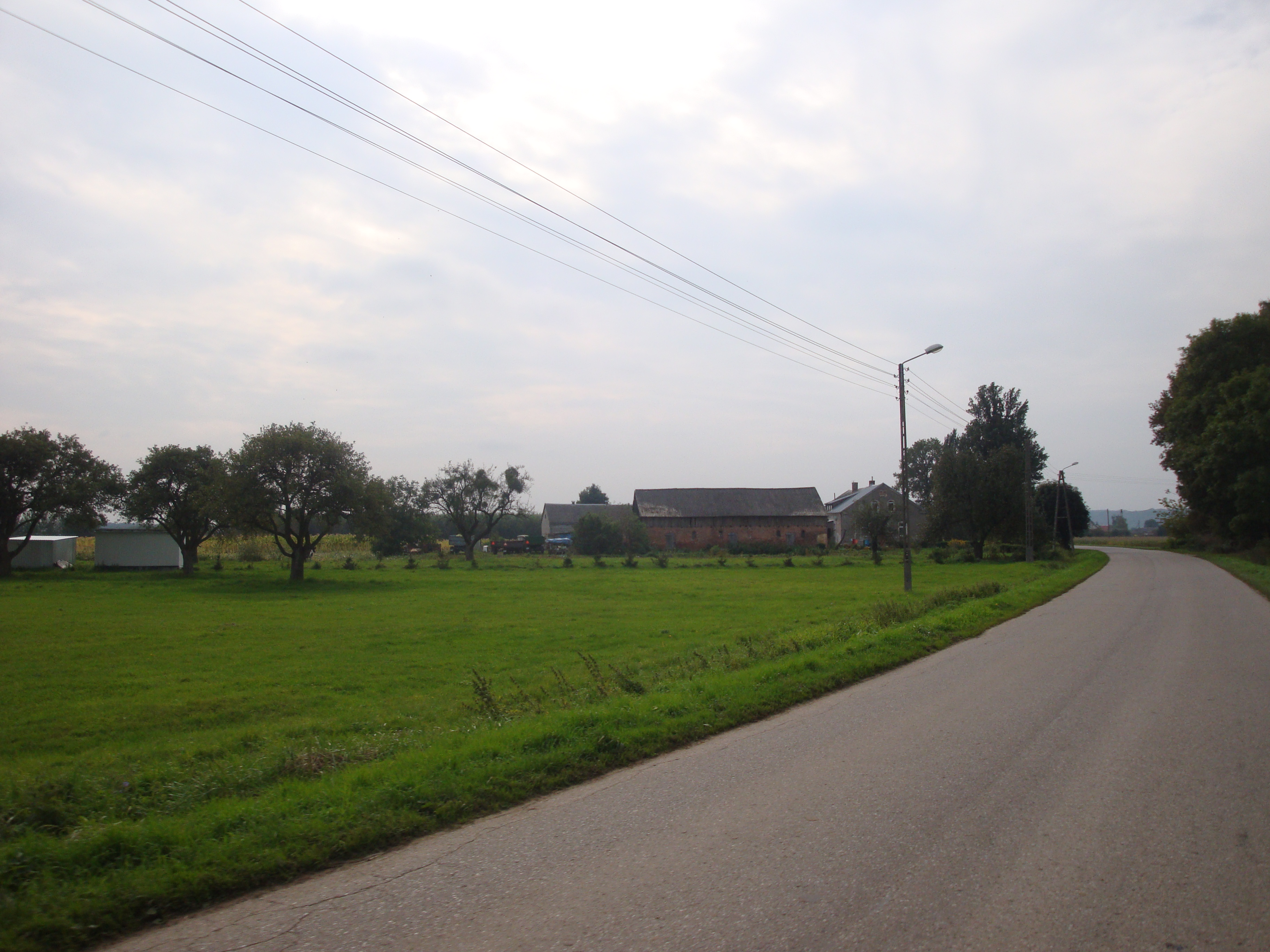
- Some houses in Kaniczki

- Location within Poland
- Coordinates: 53°40′42″N 18°47′17″E
- Country: Poland
- Voivodeship: Pomeranian
- County: Kwidzyn
- Gmina: Sadlinki
- Population (2022): 287

Kaniczki [kaˈnit͡ʂki] is a village in the administrative district of Gmina Sadlinki, within Kwidzyn County, Pomeranian Voivodeship, in northern Poland.

For the history of the region, see History of Pomerania.
