= Kamionka, Kwidzyn County =

Kamionka
- Village
- Location within Poland
- Coordinates: 53°45′47″N 18°58′45″E
- Country: Poland
- Voivodeship: Pomeranian
- County: Kwidzyn
- Gmina: Kwidzyn
- Population: 195

Kamionka ([kaˈmjɔnka]; German: Kamiontken, 1938–45 Lamprechtsdorf) is a village in the administrative district of Gmina Kwidzyn, within Kwidzyn County, Pomeranian Voivodeship, in northern Poland.

For the history of the region, see History of Pomerania.
