= Kałdowo, Kwidzyn County =

Kałdowo
- Village
- Location within Poland
- Coordinates: 53°46′44″N 19°08′38″E
- Country: Poland
- Voivodeship: Pomeranian
- County: Kwidzyn
- Gmina: Prabuty

Kałdowo [kau̯ˈdɔvɔ] is a village in the administrative district of Gmina Prabuty, within Kwidzyn County, Pomeranian Voivodeship, in northern Poland.

For the history of the region, see History of Pomerania.
