= Ośno, Pomeranian Voivodeship =

Ośno
- Village
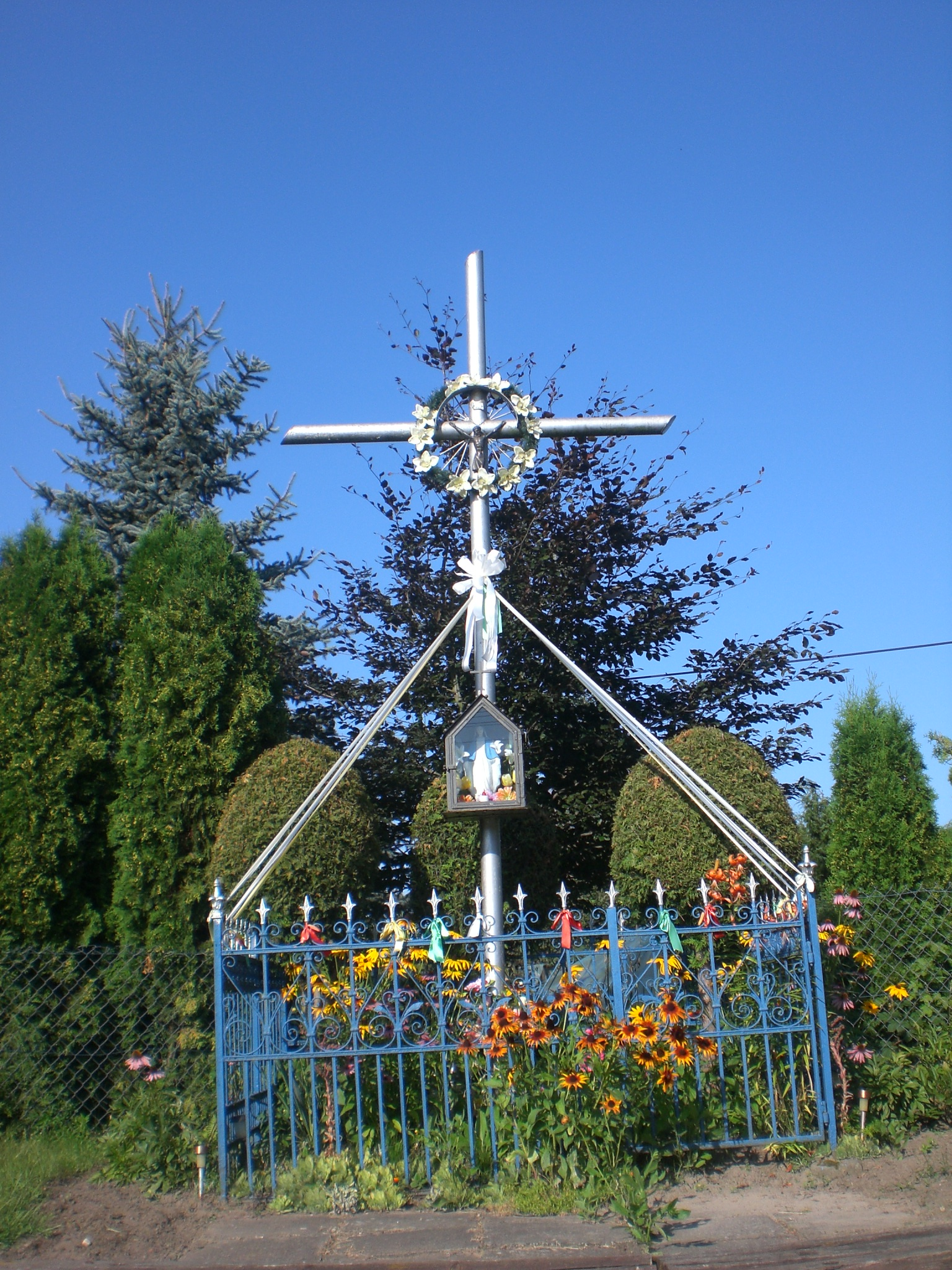
- Wayside cross in Ośno

- Location within Poland
- Coordinates: 53°45′50″N 19°3′20″E
- Country: Poland
- Voivodeship: Pomeranian
- County: Kwidzyn
- Gmina: Kwidzyn
- Population: 290
- Time zone: UTC+1 (CET)
  - Summer (DST): UTC+2 (CEST)
- Vehicle registration: GKW

Ośno [ˈɔɕnɔ] (Oschen) is a village in the administrative district of Gmina Kwidzyn, within Kwidzyn County, Pomeranian Voivodeship, in northern Poland.
