= Grabówko, Kwidzyn County =

Grabówko
- Village
- Location within Poland
- Coordinates: 53°42′35″N 18°51′21″E
- Country: Poland
- Voivodeship: Pomeranian
- County: Kwidzyn
- Gmina: Kwidzyn
- Population: 240

Grabówko [ɡraˈbufkɔ] is a village in the administrative district of Gmina Kwidzyn, within Kwidzyn County, Pomeranian Voivodeship, in northern Poland.

For the history of the region, see History of Pomerania.
