= Nebrowo Wielkie =

- Village
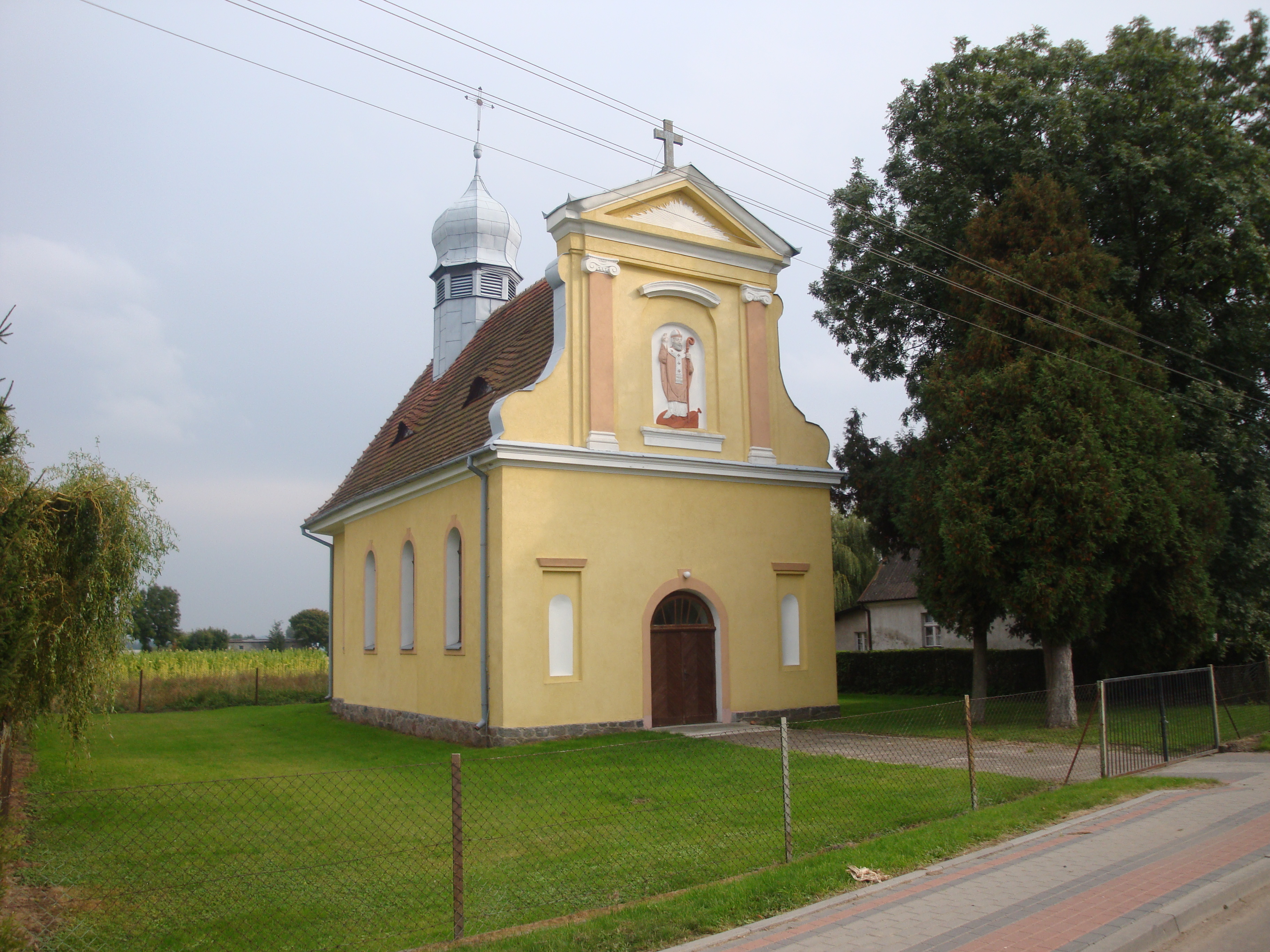
- Church of St. Stanislaus in Nebrowo Wielkie

- Location within Poland
- Coordinates: 53°39′N 18°45′E
- Country: Poland
- Voivodeship: Pomeranian
- County: Kwidzyn
- Gmina: Sadlinki
- Population (2022): 310

Nebrowo Wielkie [nɛˈbrɔvɔ ˈvjɛlkʲɛ] is a village in the administrative district of Gmina Sadlinki, within Kwidzyn County, Pomeranian Voivodeship, in northern Poland.
