= Rumunki, Pomeranian Voivodeship =

Rumunki
- Settlement
- Location within Poland
- Coordinates: 53°49′51″N 19°11′21″E
- Country: Poland
- Voivodeship: Pomeranian
- County: Kwidzyn
- Gmina: Prabuty

Rumunki [ruˈmunki] is a settlement in the administrative district of Gmina Prabuty, within Kwidzyn County, Pomeranian Voivodeship, in northern Poland.

For the history of the region, see History of Pomerania.
