= Bursztych =

Settlement in Pomerania

- Village
- Location within Poland
- Coordinates: 53°48′59″N 18°51′3″E
- Country: Poland
- Voivodeship: Pomeranian
- County: Kwidzyn
- Gmina: Kwidzyn
- Time zone: UTC+1 (CET)
  - Summer (DST): UTC+2 (CEST)
- Vehicle registration: GKW

Bursztych (Polish: [ˈburʂtɨx]) was a village in the administrative district of Gmina Kwidzyn, within Kwidzyn County, Pomeranian Voivodeship, in northern Poland.

Bursztych is now part of Janowo.
