= Młynisko, Pomeranian Voivodeship =

Młynisko
- Settlement
- Location within Poland
- Coordinates: 53°45′13″N 19°08′03″E
- Country: Poland
- Voivodeship: Pomeranian
- County: Kwidzyn
- Gmina: Prabuty

Młynisko [mwɨˈniskɔ] is a settlement in the administrative district of Gmina Prabuty, within Kwidzyn County, Pomeranian Voivodeship, in northern Poland.

For the history of the region, see History of Pomerania.

== See also ==
- Młynisko, Greater Poland Voivodeship (west-central Poland)
- Młynisko, Łódź Voivodeship (central Poland)
- Młynisko, Masovian Voivodeship (east-central Poland)
