= Republic of Ostrów =

Republic of Ostrów Republika Ostrowska
- 1918–1918
- Capital: Ostrów Wielkopolski
- Government: Republic
- Historical era: World War I
  - Established: 10 November 1918
  - Disestablished: 26 November 1918
Preceded by	Succeeded by
German Empire	Second Polish Republic

The Republic of Ostrów (Polish: Republika Ostrowska) was a short-lived republic in the Polish area of Ostrów Wielkopolski. The republic, declared on 10 November 1918, intended to liberate Poles from Prussia and the German Empire. It was formed about a month before the Greater Poland Uprising.

== Background ==
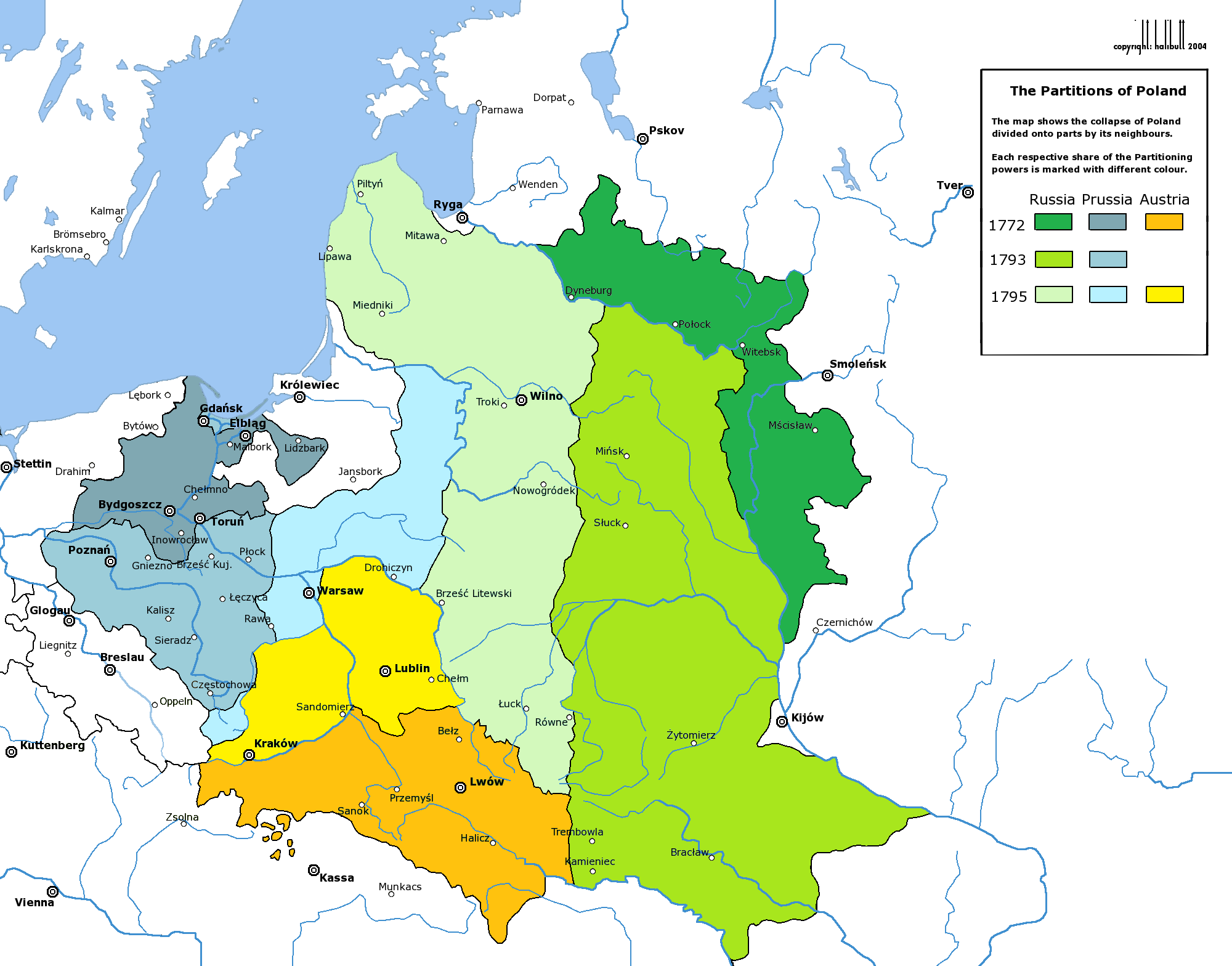
The partitions of Poland. Ostrów Wielkopolski (mid-blue), in Greater Poland, was annexed by Prussia toward the end of the 18th century.

The Polish–Lithuanian Commonwealth was partitioned by Russia, Prussia and Austria during the 18th century. In the second partition, the Greater Poland region, including the town of Ostrów were annexed by Prussia. Throughout the 19th century and into the start of the 20th, the town and the region were a center of the Polish independence movement.

== End of German rule ==
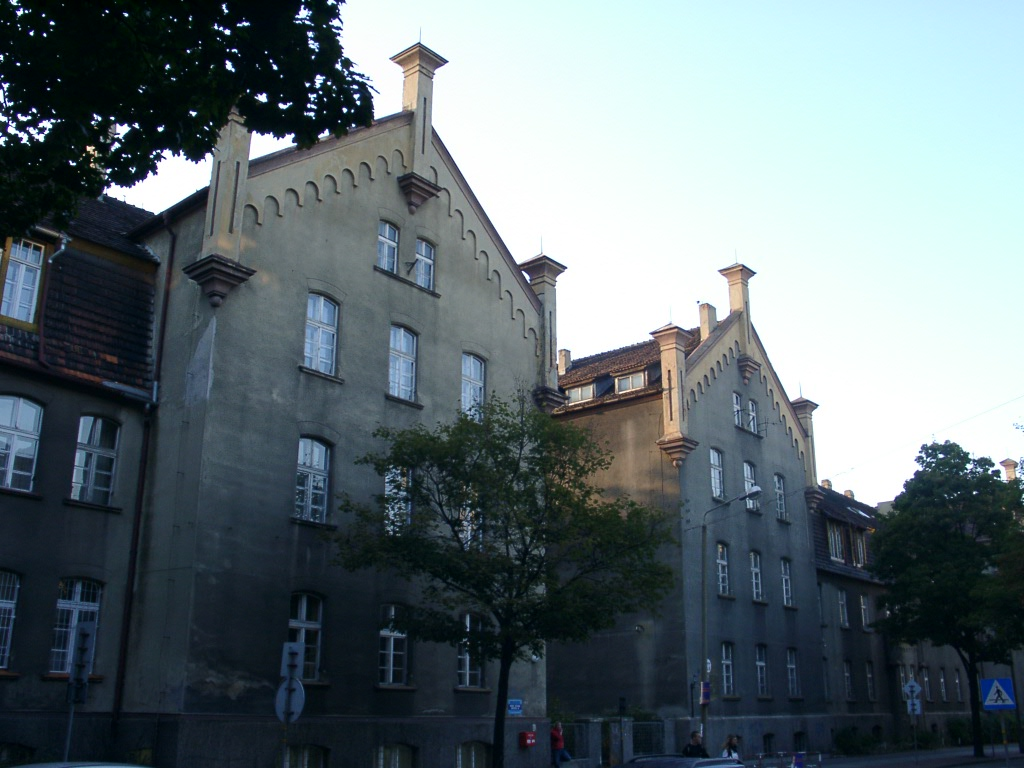
The old barracks in Ostrów, taken over by the insurgents during the short-lived Republic.

During the autumn of 1918, the imminent defeat of Germany and Austria-Hungary in the First World War and the dissolution of the Russian Empire following the Russian Revolution raised the possibility that an independent Polish state could be restored. Although the Second Polish Republic was established in early November, the question of the Greater Poland region remained unresolved. As a consequence, various Polish organizations began planning for an armed uprising to ensure that the area would become part of the new Polish state.

== Formation of Citizens' Committee ==
In Ostrów, a Citizens' Committee was formed by local Poles in September 1918, which then prepared for a takeover of the city's administration. After the outbreak of revolution in Germany, local German workers began to form their own committees and a Soldiers' Council was created on November 10 by the German troops stationed locally. On the same day, Poles in Ostrów created two organizations of their own: the People's Committee and a youth group called the Emergency Communication Services. These were joined by the 1st Regiment of Polish Infantry based in the city.

== Unilateral declaration of independent republic ==
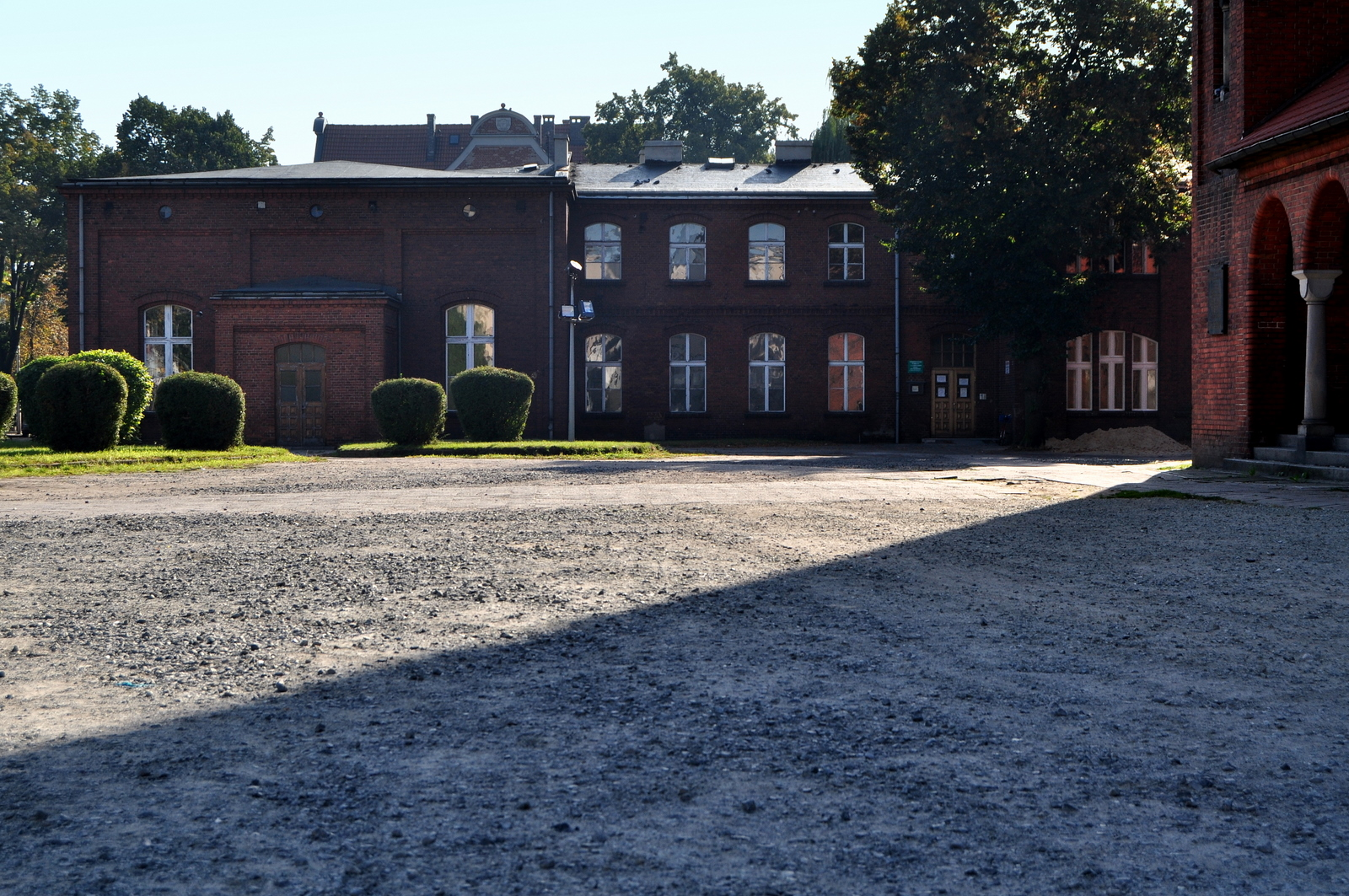
The "Catholic House", 2009.

On the same day, around one thousand people gathered in the local "Catholic House". There, Włodzimierz Lewandowski, a soldier in the Landwehr, urged Polish citizens to take up arms against the German Soldiers' Council. The Citizens' Committee, however, was hoping for a non-violent resolution of the conflict. Aleksander Dubiski, who had been elected "marshal" of the gathering, urged the crowd to issue a general proclamation stating:

Over a thousand soldiers and citizens of all classes have decided unanimously today that, according to the Wilson Plan recognized by all fighting nations, the city and county of Ostrów constitutes Polish territory, which belongs to the Nation of Poland. We express our sympathy for the movement for freedom of our German co-citizens. Until the Polish People's Republic finally takes over the government, this Polish committee considers itself to be the only legitimate authority.

The following day, Polish controllers were introduced into German administrative offices with the power to counter-sign any orders issued by German authorities. The local Landrat was removed from power. The next day, insurrectionists took over the garrison, together with its arms supply, as well as other significant public buildings in the city.

Throughout November, German pro-revolutionary newspapers in Berlin reported on the creation of the Republic.

== End of republic ==
On November 26, believing the insurrection to have begun too early, the Naczelna Rada Ludowa, which claimed authority over the entire pro-Polish movement in Wielkopolska, prompted the armed Polish units to disband. The Polish Citizens' Committee signed an agreement with the German Soldiers' Council. The 1st Regiment and other organizations then moved to the Second Polish Republic in nearby Szczypiorno and Kalisz and joined similar insurrectionist formations. A month later, the Greater Poland Uprising began in Poznań. On December 31, 1918, the 1st Regiment returned to Ostrów and liberated it.

== Modern interpretation ==
A TV series about the Republic was made in 1985 and, in 1986, the movie Republika Nadziei (Republic of Hope) was released. The book Republika Ostrowska: Przyczynek do historii powstania wielkopolskiego, 1918-1919 (Republic of Ostrów: A contribution to the history of Greater Poland, 1918-1919) by Zenon Dykcik was published in 1995.

== Commemoration ==
In 2008, in commemoration of the 90th anniversary of the proclamation of the Republic, a reconstruction of the events surrounding its proclamation and the wider conflict within Greater Poland was organized in Ostrów Wielkopolski.

== See also ==
- First Republic of Pińczów
- Komańcza Republic
- Lemko Republic
- Republic of Gniew
- Republic of Tarnobrzeg
- Republic of Zakopane
