= Gmina Prabuty =

Gmina Prabuty Prabuty Commune
- Gmina
- Coat of arms
- Interactive map of Gmina Prabuty
- Coordinates (Prabuty): 53°45′21″N 19°11′51″E
- Country: Poland
- Voivodeship: Pomeranian
- County: Kwidzyn
- Seat: Prabuty

Area
  - Total: 197.12 km^{2} (76.11 sq mi)

Population (2006)
  - Total: 13,091
  - Density: 66.411/km^{2} (172.00/sq mi)
  - Urban: 8,488
  - Rural: 4,603
- Website: http://www.prabuty.pl/

Gmina Prabuty is an urban-rural gmina (administrative district) in Kwidzyn County, Pomeranian Voivodeship, in northern Poland. Its seat is the town of Prabuty, which lies approximately 18 kilometres (11 mi) east of Kwidzyn and 78 km (48 mi) south-east of the regional capital Gdańsk.

The gmina covers an area of 197.12 square kilometres (76.1 sq mi), and as of 2006 its total population is 13,091 (out of which the population of Prabuty amounts to 8,488, and the population of the rural part of the gmina is 4,603).

== Villages ==
Apart from the town of Prabuty, Gmina Prabuty contains the villages and settlements of Antonin, Bronowo Małe, Gdakowo, Gilwa, Gonty, Górowychy, Górowychy Małe, Grazymowo, Grodziec, Halinowo, Jakubowo, Julianowo, Kałdowo, Kamienna, Kleczewo, Kołodzieje, Kolonia Gąski, Kowale, Laskowice, Laskowicki Tartak, Młynisko, Obrzynowo, Orkusz, Pachutki, Pałatyki, Pilichowo, Pólko, Raniewo, Rodowo, Rodowo Małe, Rumunki, Stańkowo, Stary Kamień, Stary Młyn, Sypanica, Szramowo, Trumiejki and Zagaje.

== Neighbouring gminas ==
Gmina Prabuty is bordered by the gminas of Gardeja, Kisielice, Kwidzyn, Mikołajki Pomorskie, Ryjewo, Stary Dzierzgoń and Susz.
