= Gmina Sadlinki =

Gmina Sadlinki Sadlinki Commune
- Gmina
- Coat of arms
- Interactive map of Gmina Sadlinki
- Coordinates (Sadlinki): 53°40′7″N 18°52′53″E
- Country: Poland
- Voivodeship: Pomeranian
- County: Kwidzyn
- Seat: Sadlinki

Area
  - Total: 112.19 km^{2} (43.32 sq mi)

Population (2022)
  - Total: 5,859
  - Density: 52.22/km^{2} (135.3/sq mi)
- Website: http://www.sadlinki.pl/

Gmina Sadlinki is a rural gmina (administrative district) in Kwidzyn County, Pomeranian Voivodeship, in northern Poland. Its seat is the village of Sadlinki, which lies approximately 9 kilometres (6 mi) south-west of Kwidzyn and 80 km (50 mi) south of the regional capital Gdańsk.

The gmina covers an area of 112.19 square kilometres (43.3 sq mi), and as of 2022 its total population is 5,895.

The population of Gmina Sadlinki throughout the Years. 2006 - 5,673, 2007 - 5,701, 2008 - 5,724, 2009 - 5,792, 2010 - 5,825, 2011 - 5,830, 2012 - 5,856, 2013 - 5,846, 2014 - 5,850, 2015 - 5,835, 2016 - 5,841, 2017 - 5,882, 2018 - 5,880, 2019 - 5,884, 2020 - 5,894, 2021 - 5,909, 2022 - 5,895,

== Villages ==
Gmina Sadlinki contains the villages and settlements of Białki, Bronisławowo, Glina, Grabowo, Kaniczki, Karpiny, Kółeczko, Krążkowo, Nebrowo Małe, Nebrowo Wielkie, Okrągła Łąka, Olszanica, Rusinowo, Sadlinki and Wiśliny.

== Neighbouring gminas ==
Gmina Sadlinki is bordered by the town of Kwidzyn and by the gminas of Gardeja, Gniew, Grudziądz, Kwidzyn, Nowe and Rogóźno.
