= Sadlinki =

- Village
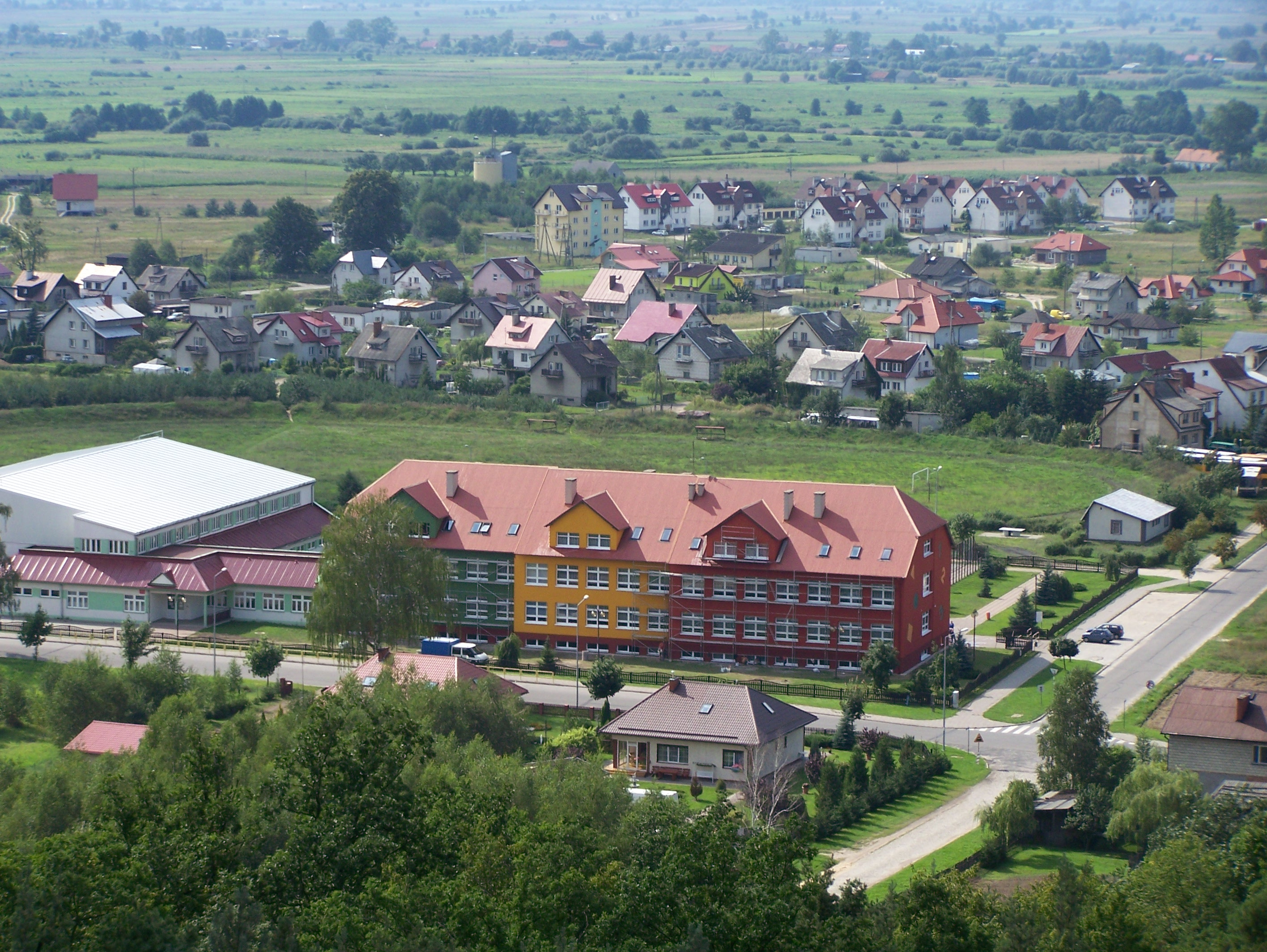
- The view of the school and the housing estate from the Tower in Sadlinki

- Location within Poland
- Coordinates: 53°40′7″N 18°52′53″E
- Country: Poland
- Voivodeship: Pomeranian
- County: Kwidzyn
- Gmina: Sadlinki
- Population: 1,785

Sadlinki ([saˈdlinki]) (German: Sedlinen) is a village in Kwidzyn County, Pomeranian Voivodeship, in northern Poland. It is the seat of the gmina (administrative district) called Gmina Sadlinki.
