= Republic of Zakopane =

Unrecognized state (1918)

Coordinates: 49°18′N 19°57′E

Republic of Zakopane Rzeczpospolita Zakopiańska
- 1918
- Flag Coat of arms

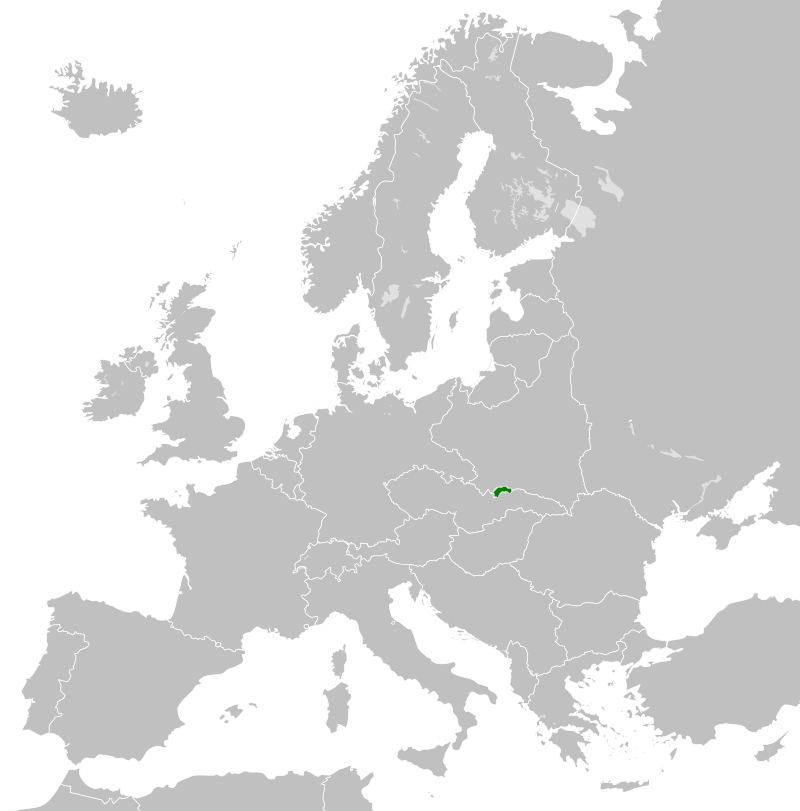
- Capital: Zakopane
- Common languages: Polish
- Religion: Roman Catholicism
- Government: Republic
  - President: Stefan Żeromski
  - Deputies: Władysław Zamoyski; Wincenty Szymborski; Mariusz Zaruski
- Legislature: Parliament
  - Chamber: National Council of the Republic of Zakopane
- Historical era: End of World War I
  - Established: October 13, 1918
  - Disestablished: November 16, 1918
Preceded by	Succeeded by
Austria-Hungary	Second Polish Republic

The Republic of Zakopane (or Commonwealth of Zakopane; Polish: Rzeczpospolita Zakopiańska) refers to an area in Galicia centered on the city of Zakopane that created its own parliament ("National Organisation") on October 13, 1918. The parliament's principal goal was to join an independent state of Poland. On October 30, the Organisation officially declared its independence from Austria-Hungary and, two days later, made itself a "National Council". This was eventually disestablished on November 16 when the Polish Liquidation Committee took control of Galicia.

The Republic's only president was the Polish writer Stefan Żeromski.

== See also ==
- First Republic of Pińczów
- Goralenvolk
- Komańcza Republic
- Lemko Republic
- Republic of Gniew
- Republic of Ostrów
- Republic of Tarnobrzeg
