= Rusinowo, Pomeranian Voivodeship =

Rusinowo
- Village
- Location within Poland
- Coordinates: 53°36′50″N 18°46′19″E
- Country: Poland
- Voivodeship: Pomeranian
- County: Kwidzyn
- Gmina: Sadlinki
- Population (2022): 172

Rusinowo [ruɕiˈnɔvɔ] is a village in the administrative district of Gmina Sadlinki, within Kwidzyn County, Pomeranian Voivodeship, in northern Poland.

For the history of the region, see History of Pomerania.
