= Stalag XX-B =

German POW camp

- Wielbark (present-day district of Malbork, Poland)

Site information
- Type: Prisoner-of-war camp
- Controlled by: Nazi Germany

Location
- Coordinates: 54°00′33″N 19°00′09″E

Site history
- In use: 1940–1945
- Battles/wars: World War II

Garrison information
- Occupants: Polish, British, French, Belgian, Serbian, Soviet, Italian, Australian, New Zealand and Canadian POWs

Stalag XX-B was a German prisoner-of-war camp in World War II, operated in Wielbark (present-day district of Malbork, Poland). It housed Polish, British, French, Belgian, Serbian, Soviet, Italian, Australian, New Zealand and Canadian POWs.

== Locations ==
The camp was founded in Recklinghausen on 16 December 1939, then relocated to Licze on 20 December 1939, and afterwards to Wielbark on 1 February 1940. Two subcamps were formed in Gdańsk, in the districts of Biskupia Górka and VII Dwór, and there were also up to about a thousand forced labour subcamps in the region.

== History ==
The first prisoners of Stalag XX-B were Polish troops captured during the German invasion of Poland, which started World War II in September 1939. Faced with frequent escapes from the camp and its subcamps, the Germans gradually deported the Polish POWs to other camps. Polish POWs recalled miserable living conditions and harassment by German guards. On 1 April 1940 there were some 2,200 POWs in Stalag XX-B and its subcamps. Following the German invasion of the Netherlands, Belgium and France, the Germans brought British, French, Belgian and Dutch POWs to the camp. In July 1940, Stalag XX-B still lacked basic infrastructure and had only overcrowded tents and dugouts for the POWs and a few barracks for the guards, all surrounded by barbed wire and watchtowers. An administration block including a hospital was erected in the latter part of 1940, mainly by prisoner labour. In the second half of 1941, there were still no showers nor a disinfection station, which were only organized in 1942. By 1941 a theatre had been built. In the fall of 1941, Soviet and Serbian POWs were brought to the camp. In early 1942, there were 23,470 POWs in the camp. By January 1944, the number had grown to nearly 30,000, mainly due to an arrival of Italian POWs, and in August 1944 the camp reached a record 35,361 POWs.

The Polish resistance secretly organized transports of POWs who escaped the camp to the port city of Gdynia, from where they were further evacuated by sea to neutral Sweden.

Most of the POWs were not housed in the main camp, but were deployed in up to about a thousand forced labour subcamps in the region. There were sizable subcamps at shipyards in Gdynia and Elbląg, and at least seven subcamps within Malbork itself, however, most were located in rural areas with the POWs working in agriculture. POWs were sent out to labour in farms, sawmills, factories, goodsyards and cutting ice on the river Nogat.

== Dissolution ==
The Germans dissolved the camp in January 1945, and the POWs were marched west. The march lasted three and a half months, during which the POWs struggled with cold, hunger, exhaustion, diseases, etc., and were even subjected to forced labor to clear cluttered roads and railroads after Allied bombings. There were days when POWs ate nothing, and some died during the march.

== See also ==
- List of German World War II POW camps

== Bibliography ==
- Journey into captivity 1940, William Bampton. Printed privately.
- The March Towards Home, William Bampton. Printed privately.
