= Gmina Kwidzyn =

Gmina Kwidzyn Kwidzyn Commune
- Gmina
- Flag Coat of arms
- Interactive map of Gmina Kwidzyn
- Coordinates (Kwidzyn): 53°44′9″N 18°55′51″E
- Country: Poland
- Voivodeship: Pomeranian
- County: Kwidzyn
- Seat: Kwidzyn

Area
  - Total: 207.25 km^{2} (80.02 sq mi)

Population (2006)
  - Total: 10,306
  - Density: 49.727/km^{2} (128.79/sq mi)
- Website: http://www.gminakwidzyn.pl/

Gmina Kwidzyn is a rural gmina (administrative district) in Kwidzyn County, Pomeranian Voivodeship, in northern Poland. Its seat is the town of Kwidzyn, although the town is not part of the territory of the gmina.

The gmina covers an area of 207.25 square kilometres (80.0 sq mi), and as of 2006 its total population is 10,306.

== Villages ==
Gmina Kwidzyn contains the villages and settlements of Baldram, Brachlewo, Brokowo, Bronno, Bursztych, Bystrzec, Dankowo, Dubiel, Gilwa Mała, Gniewskie Pole, Górki, Grabówko, Gurcz, Janowo, Jurandowo, Kamionka, Korzeniewo, Kramrowo, Licze, Lipianki, Mały Baldram, Mareza, Nowa Wieś Kwidzyńska, Nowe Lignowy, Nowy Dwór, Obory, Ośno, Paczkowo, Pastwa, Pawlice, Piekarniak, Podzamcze, Pole Rakowieckie, Pólko Małe, Rakowice, Rakowiec, Rozpędziny, Stary Dwór, Szadowo, Szadowski Młyn, Szałwinek, Szopowo, Tychnowy and Wola-Sosenka.

== Neighbouring gminas ==
Gmina Kwidzyn is bordered by the town of Kwidzyn and by the gminas of Gardeja, Gniew, Prabuty, Ryjewo and Sadlinki.
