= Młynisko, Greater Poland Voivodeship =

Młynisko
- Village
- Location within Poland
- Coordinates: 51°50′8″N 18°17′8″E
- Country: Poland
- Voivodeship: Greater Poland
- County: Kalisz
- Gmina: Koźminek
- Population: 190

Młynisko [mwɨˈniskɔ] is a village in the administrative district of Gmina Koźminek, within Kalisz County, Greater Poland Voivodeship, in west-central Poland.

== See also ==
- Młynisko, Łódź Voivodeship (central Poland)
- Młynisko, Masovian Voivodeship (east-central Poland)
- Młynisko, Pomeranian Voivodeship (north Poland)
