= Młynisko, Masovian Voivodeship =

Młynisko
- Village
- Location within Poland
- Coordinates: 52°27′18″N 21°40′30″E
- Country: Poland
- Voivodeship: Masovian
- County: Wołomin
- Gmina: Strachówka

Młynisko [mwɨˈniskɔ] is a village in the administrative district of Gmina Strachówka, within Wołomin County, Masovian Voivodeship, in east-central Poland.

== See also ==
- Młynisko, Greater Poland Voivodeship (west-central Poland)
- Młynisko, Łódź Voivodeship (central Poland)
- Młynisko, Pomeranian Voivodeship (north Poland)
