= Pólko Małe =

Settlement in Pomerania

- Przysiółek
- Location within Poland
- Coordinates: 53°50′8″N 18°51′31″E
- Country: Poland
- Voivodeship: Pomeranian
- County: Kwidzyn
- Gmina: Kwidzyn
- Time zone: UTC+1 (CET)
  - Summer (DST): UTC+2 (CEST)
- Vehicle registration: GKW

Pólko Małe [ˈpulkɔ ˈmawɛ] is a przysiółek in the administrative district of Gmina Kwidzyn, within Kwidzyn County, Pomeranian Voivodeship, in northern Poland. It is situated on the Vistula.
