= Młynisko, Łódź Voivodeship =

Młynisko
- Village
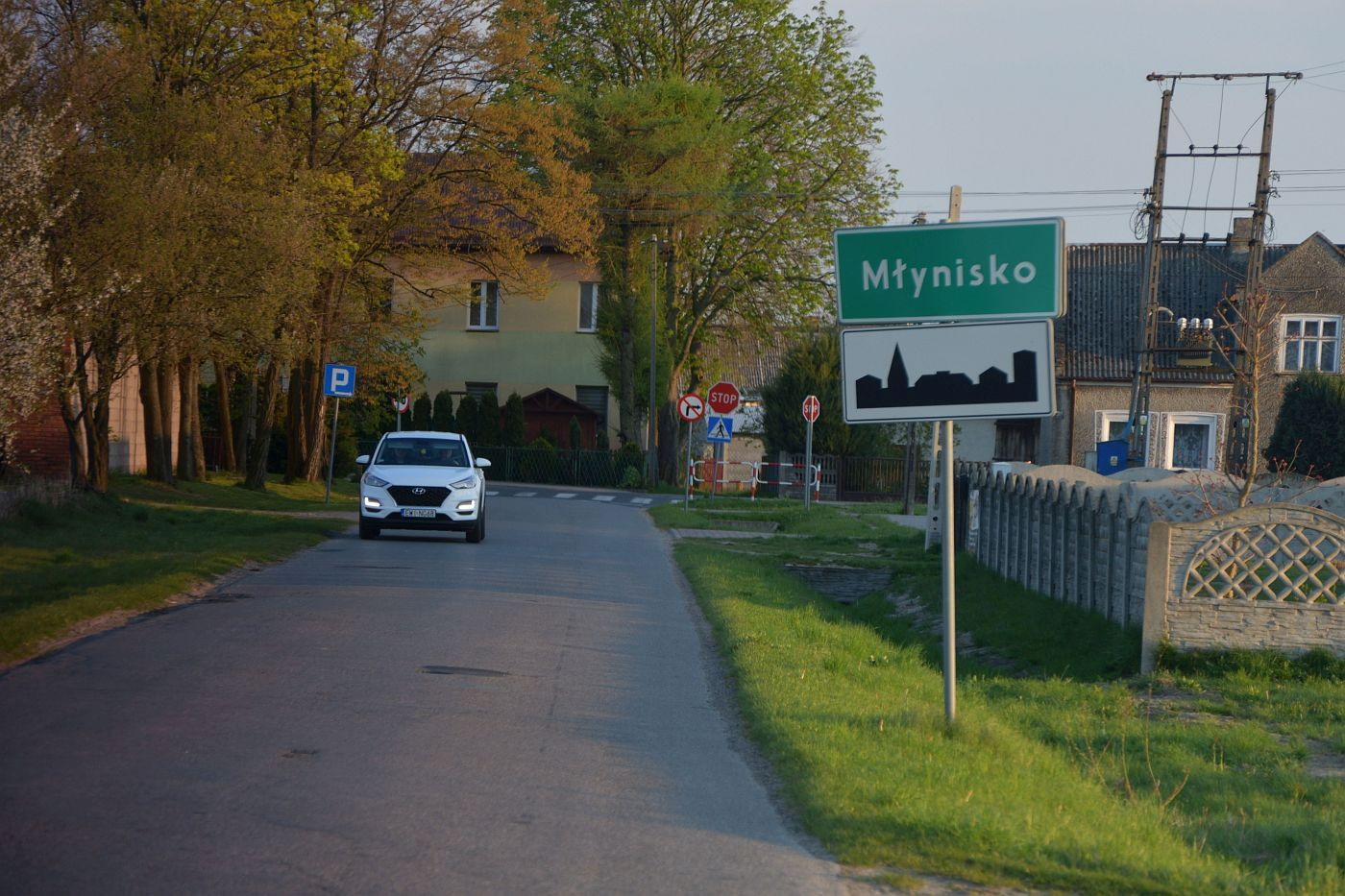

- Location within Poland
- Coordinates: 51°14′12″N 18°23′26″E
- Country: Poland
- Voivodeship: Łódź
- County: Wieluń
- Gmina: Biała
- Population: 560

Młynisko [mwɨˈniskɔ] is a village in the administrative district of Gmina Biała, within Wieluń County, Łódź Voivodeship, in central Poland.

== See also ==
- Młynisko, Greater Poland Voivodeship (west-central Poland)
- Młynisko, Masovian Voivodeship (east-central Poland)
- Młynisko, Pomeranian Voivodeship (north Poland)
