= Second Republic of Pińczów =

Short-lived state proclaimed in town of Pińczów

Second Republic of Pińczów Republika Pińczowska (Polish)
- 1944–1944
- Capital: Graby
- Common languages: Kielce dialect
- Government: Republic (State National Council)
- Heads
  - 1944: Franciszek Kucybała
  - 1944: Piotr Soja
- Józef Dąbkowski
- Commissioner
  - 1944: Józef Morton
  - 1944: Edward Wojtasik
  - 1944: Marian Dawkant
- Historical era: World War II
  - Lvov-Sandomierz Offensive: 13 July 1944
  - Established: 21 July 1944
  - Disestablished: 12 August 1944
  - Establishment of Provisional Government of the Republic of Poland: 31 December 1944

Area
- 1,000 km^{2} (390 sq mi)
Preceded by	Succeeded by
General Government	Provisional Government of the Republic of Poland
- Today part of: Poland

Republic of Pińczów (Polish: Republika Pińczowska; German: Bandenverseuchtes Gebiet) was a name of short-lived entity in Świętokrzyskie Voivodeship liberated by joint forces of Polish Resistance formations: Home Army, People's Army and Peasants' Battalions, during a period from July 21 to August 12, 1944. Power in the Republic belonged to delegate of Polish Government in Exile and local commander of the Home Army Forces. There was also a separate authority for the communist forces which did not recognize the London-based government-in-exile. The Republic collapsed due to concentration of Wehrmacht nearby and lack of supplies. The anniversary of the creation of the Pińczów Republic is commemorated by local Polish authorities.

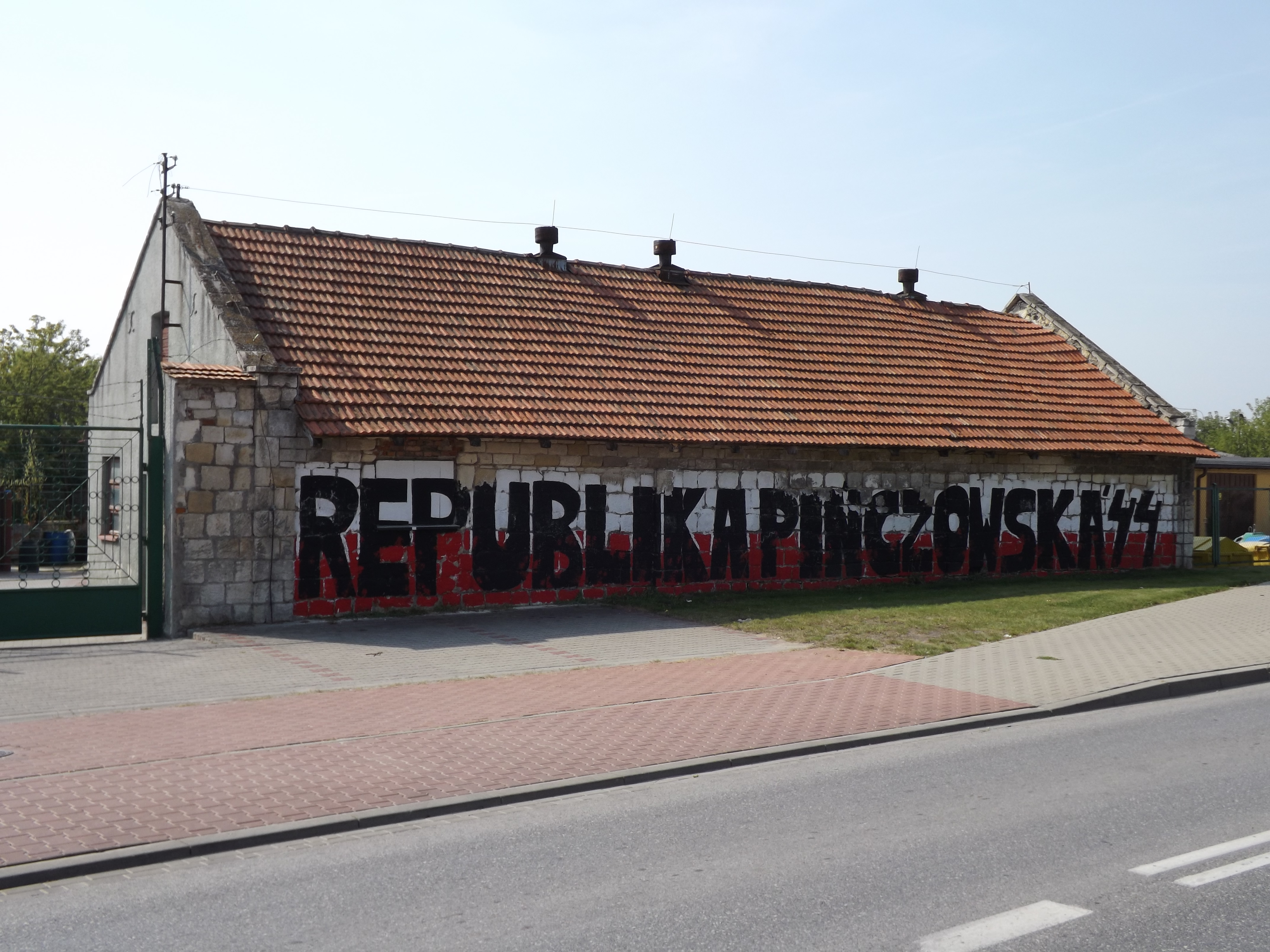
A graffiti mural in Pińczów commemorating the Republic

== See also ==
- First Republic of Pińczów
