= First Republic of Pińczów =

Area of Poland, briefly independent in 1918

Republic of Pińczów Republika Pińczowska (Polish)
- Administrative map of Pińczów County
- Capital: Pińczów
- Historical era: Revolutions of 1917–1923
Preceded by	Succeeded by
Kingdom of Galicia and Lodomeria	Second Polish Republic
- Today part of: Poland

The Republic of Pińczów (Polish: Republika Pińczowska) was an area of Pińczów and the surrounding area which was liberated at the end of 1918 for a period of six weeks by the city's inhabitants, led by Jan Lisowski, after the disarmament of Austrian troops without a fight.

== History ==
The city was seized at the end of 1918 after an action carried out by a group of about 150 people, consisting of members of the fire brigade and residents. The group that disarmed the Austro-Hungarian Army's occupation unit consisting of Hungarians without a fight was commanded by Jan Lisowski, an activist of the SDKPiL. As agricultural strikes took place in the powiat, a punitive expedition was sent to Rosiejów (the most inflammatory place), which sent the striking fornals to the farm buildings. The strikers were released after the relief organized by Jan Lisowski. Due to this event, Lisowski was arrested and imprisoned.

There was also a former Austrian officer Kalinka, pseudonym "Kazuń", leading a group spreading socialist and anarchist slogans. This group, based on peasants, carried out several attacks, including in Działoszyce and Wodzisław. The attack on Działoszyce and disarmament of police officers took place on November 12, and on Wodzisław on November 18, 1918. It was carried out by an 18-strong Kalinka unit and a group of several hundred peasants armed with poles and axes. The group committed robberies, but only on rich people. Fearing the actions of the agitated peasants, several landed gentry families left their homes and went to Kielce. Kalinka died in a fight with a punitive army unit in the Piotrków forests.

In 1944, after the liberation from the German occupation of Pińczów and the surrounding area and the seizure of power by partisans from the Peasants' Battalions, the Home Army and the People's Army, a Second Pińczów Republic was established.

== See also ==
- Komańcza Republic
- Lemko Republic
- Republic of Gniew
- Republic of Ostrów
- Republic of Ostrowiec
- Republic of Tarnobrzeg
- Republic of Zakopane
- Second Republic of Pińczów
- Sejny Uprising

== Bibliography ==
- Małecki, Zygmunt; Marcinkowski, Stanisław (1975). Ziemia pińczowska. Kraków: Krajowa Agencja Wydawnicza.
- Praca zbiorowa (1970). Z dziejów ziemi kieleckiej 1918–1944. Warsaw: Książka i Wiedza.
- Skwarek, Stefan (1974). Ziemia Niepokonana. Kielecczyzna w walce 1830–1945. Warsaw: Książka i Wiedza.
- Praca zbiorowa (1964). Drogi rozwoju ruchu ludowego. Warsaw: LSW.
