= Janowo, Kwidzyn County =

Janowo
- Village
- Location within Poland
- Coordinates: 53°49′1″N 18°51′20″E
- Country: Poland
- Voivodeship: Pomeranian
- County: Kwidzyn
- Gmina: Kwidzyn
- Population: 410

Janowo [jaˈnɔvɔ] is a village in the administrative district of Gmina Kwidzyn, within Kwidzyn County, Pomeranian Voivodeship, in northern Poland.
