= Kramrowo =

Settlement in Pomerania

- Village
- Location within Poland
- Coordinates: 53°49′46″N 18°53′4″E
- Country: Poland
- Voivodeship: Pomeranian
- County: Kwidzyn
- Gmina: Kwidzyn
- Time zone: UTC+1 (CET)
  - Summer (DST): UTC+2 (CEST)
- Vehicle registration: GKW

Kramrowo [kramˈrɔvɔ] is a village in the administrative district of Gmina Kwidzyn, within Kwidzyn County, Pomeranian Voivodeship, in northern Poland.
