= Kwidzyn County =

Kwidzyn County Powiat kwidzyński
- County
- Flag Coat of arms

- Division into gminas
- Coordinates (Kwidzyn): 53°44′9″N 18°55′51″E
- Country: Poland
- Voivodeship: Pomeranian
- Seat: Kwidzyn
- Gminas: Total 6 (incl. 1 urban): Kwidzyn; Gmina Gardeja; Gmina Kwidzyn; Gmina Prabuty; Gmina Ryjewo; Gmina Sadlinki

Area
  - Total: 834.64 km^{2} (322.26 sq mi)

Population (2019)
  - Total: 83,231
  - Density: 99.721/km^{2} (258.28/sq mi)
  - Urban: 47,139
  - Rural: 36,092
- Car plates: GKW
- Website: www.powiatkwidzynski.pl

Kwidzyn County (Polish: powiat kwidzyński) is a unit of territorial administration and local government (powiat) in Pomeranian Voivodeship, northern Poland. It came into being on January 1, 1999, as a result of the Polish local government reforms passed in 1998. Its administrative seat and largest town is Kwidzyn, which lies 73 kilometres (45 mi) south of the regional capital Gdańsk. The only other town in the county is Prabuty, lying 18 km (11 mi) east of Kwidzyn.

The county covers an area of 834.64 square kilometres (322.3 sq mi). As of 2019 its total population is 83,231, out of which the population of Kwidzyn is 38,444, that of Prabuty is 8,695, and the rural population is 36,092.

Kwidzyn County on a map of the counties of Pomeranian Voivodeship

Kwidzyn County is bordered by Tczew County to the west, Sztum County to the north, Iława County to the east, Grudziądz County to the south and Świecie County to the south-west.

== Administrative divisions ==
The county is subdivided into six gminas (one urban, one urban-rural and four rural). These are listed in the following table, in descending order of population.

Gmina	Type	Area (km^{2})	Population (2019)	Seat
Kwidzyn	urban	21.8	38,444	
Gmina Prabuty	urban-rural	197.1	13,119	Prabuty
Gmina Kwidzyn	rural	207.3	11,423	Kwidzyn *
Gmina Gardeja	rural	193.0	8,431	Gardeja
Gmina Ryjewo	rural	103.3	5,845	Ryjewo
Gmina Sadlinki	rural	112.2	5,969	Sadlinki
* seat not part of the gmina
