= Carl Julius Meyer von Klinggräff =

German botanist

Carl Julius Meyer von Klinggräff (26 March 1809 in Klein Watkowitz in Kreis Stuhm – 1879) was a German botanist.

== Biography ==
He was born into the Klinggräff family, noble family from Thuringia. From 1828 to 1832, he studied medicine and botany at the University of Königsberg, where he was influenced by Ernst Heinrich Friedrich Meyer. In 1832 he received his doctorate in medicine and surgery with the thesis "De carie vertebrarum". Following graduation, he traveled to his parents' home near Zagreb, and on the journey, conducted studies of Alpine flora and plants native to the Adriatic coast. He visited Fiume, Trieste, islands in the Gulf of Quarnero and made the acquaintanceship of botanists Bartolomeo Biasoletto, Friedrich Wilhelm Noë and Mutius von Tommasini.

In 1834 he returned to Prussia, settling in Marienwerder as a general practitioner. In 1836 he relocated to the town of Paleschken, from where he concentrated on botanical research. During his career, he made numerous trips throughout the Province of Prussia, and in 1844, took an extended journey to Austria, Switzerland and northern Italy.

He made major contributions to the knowledge of Prussian flora, conducting research in the fields of phytogeography, plant systematics and climatology as it pertained to botany.

He was an older brother to bryologist Hugo Erich Meyer von Klinggräff (1820–1902, H.Klinggr.)

== Selected works ==
- Flora von Preussen : die in der Provinz Preussen wildwachsenden Phanerogamen, 1848.
- Nachtrag zur Flora von Preussen, 1854.
