= Szkaradowo =

Szkaradowo may refer to these places in Poland:

- Szkaradowo, Greater Poland Voivodeship, a village in Rawicz County, Greater Poland Voivodeship
- Szkaradowo Wielkie, a village in Kwidzyn County, Pomeranian Voivodeship
- Szkaradowo Szlacheckie, a settlement in Kwidzyn County, Pomeranian Voivodeship
