= Hugo Erich Meyer von Klinggräff =

German botanist

- Born: June 7, 1820; Klein Watkowitz, Stuhm
- Died: April 3, 1902 (aged 81); Paleschken, Stuhm
- Education: University of Königsberg
- Scientific career
- Fields: bryology

Hugo Erich Meyer von Klinggräff (7 June 1820 in Klein Watkowitz, Stuhm – 3 April 1902 in Paleschken, Stuhm) was a German botanist, who was a specialist in bryophytes.

== Biography ==
Hugo Erich Meyer von Klinggräff was born into the Klinggräff family, noble family from Thuringia. He was the brother of botanist Carl Julius Meyer von Klinggräff, with whom he often collaborated.

In 1826, he moved with his parents to a homestead located not far from Agram, Croatia. He later studied at the University of Königsberg, receiving his doctorate in 1846. Following graduation, he returned to Croatia, where he botanized in areas along the Adriatic Sea and islands within the Gulf of Quarnero. During this time period, he collaborated with other botanists, that included Mutius von Tommasini. In 1852 he acquired an estate in Wiszniewo bei Lobau, Province of Prussia.

== Publications ==
- Klinggräff, H. v. (1858) "Die höheren Cryptogamen Preussens" (Königsberg) – The higher cryptogams of Prussia.
- "Die in der Umgegend von Agram in Croatien vorkommenden Pflanzen", 1861 – On plants native to areas near Agram.
- — (1862). "In anderen Gegenden Croatiens gefundene Pflanzen" [Plants Found in Other Parts of Croatia]. Linnaea (in German). 31: 49–62. ISSN 0178-5397.
- "Versuch einer topographischen Flora der Provinz Westpreussen" 1880 – Essay on the phytogeography of West Prussia.
- "Ueber die Bastarde bei Farnen und Moosen", 1889 – On hybrids of ferns and mosses.
- "Die Leber- und Laubmoose West- und Ostpreussens, 1893 – Liverworts and mosses of West and East Prussia.

He issued the exsiccata Unio itineraria cryptogamica 1864.
