= Battle of Trzciana =

1629 battle during the Polish–Swedish War

Coordinates: 53°48′02″N 19°03′47″E

- Part of the Polish–Swedish War (1626–1629)
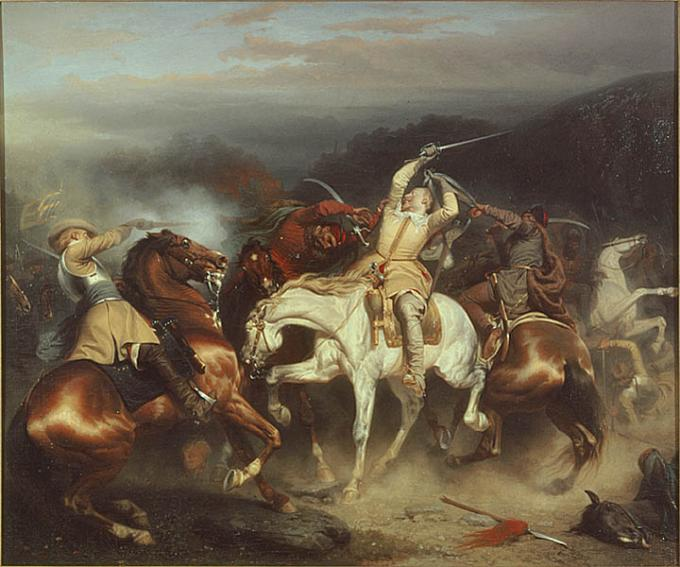
- Gustav II Adolf almost killed in the battle of Trzciana, 1629
| Date | June 25, 1629 |
| Location | Trzciano / Honigfelde, Royal Prussia (Crown of the Kingdom of Poland, today Trzciano, Poland) |
| Result | Polish–Imperial victory |

Belligerents
| Polish–Lithuanian Commonwealth; Holy Roman Empire | Swedish Empire |

Commanders and leaders
| (Polish–Lithuanian Commonwealth) Stanisław Koniecpolski (Holy Roman Empire) Hans Georg von Arnim | (Swedish Empire) Gustavus Adolphus |

Strength
| 1,300 hussars 1,200 light cavalry 2,000 reiters | 4,000–4,500 cavalry 5,000 infantry 18 artillery pieces |

Casualties and losses
| 300 killed: 150 Poles and 150 Austrians | 200–1,500 killed 200–500 captured, including many senior officers. |

The Battle of Trzciana (also known as Battle of Honigfelde or Battle on the Stuhmer Heide or Battle of Sztum) took place on 25 June 1629 (usually said to be 27th in the New Style calendar) and was one of the battles of the Polish-Swedish War (1626–1629) or Second Swedish-Polish War. The Polish forces, including the winged hussars, were led by Crown Field Hetman Stanisław Koniecpolski and imperial troops under Hans Georg von Arnim-Boitzenburg, sent by Emperor Ferdinand II to aid Sigismund III, met with troops commanded by Swedish King Gustav II Adolf, who supported the Protestant Lutherans of Germany and northern Europe. Gustav Adolf was almost killed or captured twice. Fighting in Prussia continued after the battle into July and August and ended with stalemate and finally a truce accepted by Sigismund III.

== History ==
Swedish and Polish-Lithuanian king Sigismund III sought to hold on to the crown of Sweden, but was rejected by the Swedish people, and Sigismund's uncle Karl became king of Sweden instead. Sigismund wanted to regain the Swedish crown and he also wanted to gain the crown of Russia. Russia requested help from Karl of Sweden. The Holy Roman Empire under the Habsburgs attempted to regain European countries for Catholicism and to gain control of northern German Baltic Sea trading cities, namely the Hansa, and to reverse the North having become Lutheran and thereby Sweden gaining supremacy over the Baltic Sea. The trade routes for some time had been controlled by a powerful Denmark, which controlled and collected at the Sound in its territory. Sigismund III of Poland-Lithuania sought to wrest the Baltic Sea with its lucrative trade routes for himself and he repeatedly requested Swedish king Gustav Adolph to renounce his title of Swedish king as a prerequisite for a truce and peace negotiations. The Swedes saw through these delaying tactics by Sigismund III and so the battles and skirmishes went on for years.

=== Eve of the Meeting at Honigfelde ===
In early 1629 the Polish king Sigismund III Vasa received military support from the Emperor Ferdinand II. The reinforcements, 5000 infantry and reiters, led by Hans Georg von Arnim, arrived in Prussia in late spring 1629, and set up camp near Grudziądz (Graudenz). After wintering in Sweden, Gustav Adolf arrived in Prussia in May. Several skirmishes (Scharmuetzel) broke out, one on June 27, 1629 at Honigfelde (Honigfeldt on older maps) south of Sztum, where Gustav Adolph led his army of 4,000 cavalry and 5,000 infantry from Marienburg (Malbork) against the Imperial and Polish forces.

=== Battle ===
The Swedish objective to confront one opposing force before the enemy could link up failed, and Gustav was forced to withdraw towards Marienburg (Malbork) to avoid their now superior numbers. However, discovering his withdrawal, Polish hetman Koniecpolski and von Arnim dispatched a force of 1,300 hussars, 1,200 light cavalry, and 2,000 reiters to harry the Swedes. This force caught up with the Swedish army at the village of Honigfelde (Polish Trzciana, modern Trzciano) on the Sztum Heath (Stuhmer Heide).

On learning of the proximity of the Polish and Imperial forces, Gustav II Adolf had ordered the troops of Rhinecount (Rheingraf) Otto Ludwig to continue the march. Otto Ludwig did not follow orders and instead maintained a position at Honigfelde with 1,950 horsemen, 60 infantrymen, and ten 3-pounder leather cannons. Meanwhile, Koniecpolski ordered his Polish cossack horse to advance through the woods northwest of Sadowe and his hussars to make a flanking manoeuvre behind the hills south-east of Honigfelde. Von Arnim's slower and heavier cuirassier regiments reached the battlefield last and formed into battle order to attack the Swedes frontally.

The Swedish leather cannons began to fire on the approaching cossacks as they came out of the woods and the Rheincount ordered his harquebusiers to attack them. Both the cossacks and harquebusiers were mobile cavalry with good firepower but the Germans harquebusiers gained the upper hand and began pushing the outnumbered cossacks back towards the forest. At this moment the Polish hussars arrived from their flanking manoeuvre, a few companies were sent to deal with the Swedish artillery and the 60 musketeers supporting them but the majority advanced to charge the engaged arquebusiers.

The harquebusiers quickly collapsed as the hussars charged their flank and rear and fled in great disorder towards the north towards the rest of their army. Gustav Adolf arrived to aid the Rheincount and they regrouped by charging with Zacharias Pauli's squadron and Reinhold Anrep's Finnish squadron of 700 cavalry, but most of these were demoralised by the flight of the rearguard and joined within it. Gustav Adolf was at great risk as he and the remaining cavalry were pursued by Polish cossacks. He was almost captured by a cossack but escaped when one of his officers, (according to legend) Erik Soop, shot the attacker and enabled Gustavus to rejoin the rest of the cavalry.

The situation was critical as the Swedes reached the village of Straszewo, but Field Marshal Wrangel momentarily stabilised the situation by charging the pursuing Poles with his entire force of 2,150 cavalrymen. This gave Gustav Adolf the time to reassemble 1,000 men of his fleeing squadrons and rejoin battle. Von Arnim's cuirassiers and Koniecpolski's hussars once again charged and the Swedes were thrown back once again, but this time in better order. The Swedes then began a withdrawal to Pułkowice (Pulkowitz) 7 km from Trzciana, where the Swedish guard cuirassiers and Streiff's squadron of 750 men took up a defensive position.

During their retreat the Swedes were subjected to fierce attacks, suffering heavy losses. As they neared Pułkowice (Pulkowitz), they were relieved by a counterattack by Streiffs squadron. The battle now reached a deadlock until von Arnim once again caught up with his cuirassiers and turned the battle against the Swedes again. The Swedes again withdrew, this time to Neudorf (Nowa Wieś) where their 1,260-strong infantry with eight 6 and 12 pounder cannons had taken up position by the river-crossing, and without too much trouble were able to hold off the tired Polish-Imperial cavalry until darkness fell. The following day the Swedes were able to withdraw unmolested to Marienburg (Malbork).

=== After the Battle ===
The Swedish cavalry had suffered serious losses during the battle, with about 600- 1000 dead and 200- 500 captured by the Poles, including many high-ranking officers, along with 1,300 of the initially 5,500 horses, being unable to serve the cavalry due to losses and wounds. The Polish cavalry proved to be superior to the Swedish cavalry.

Hetman Koniecpolski's victory forced Swedish King Gustav II Adolf to go on the defensive, who said after the battle that "I have never experienced such a bath".
A further attack by the Polish side under Koniecpolski on July 15 was repelled as was one on August 9 on the Elbinger Werder (Żuławy Elbląskie) by a demoralized Polish group looking for food.

Soon after, foreign diplomats arrived at Warsaw and the Truce of Altmark was signed which ended the hostilities of the Polish–Swedish war.

The Battle of Trzciana is commemorated on the Tomb of the Unknown Soldier, Warsaw, with the inscription "TRZCIANA 25 VI 1629".
