= Kuliki =

Kuliki may refer to:

- Kuliki, Kwidzyn County, a village in north Poland
- Kuliki, Sztum County, a village in north Poland
- Kuliki, Oryol Oblast, a village in Oryol Oblast, Russia
- Kuliki, Pskov Oblast, a village in Pskov Oblast, Russia
- Kuliki, name of several other rural localities in Russia
