= Borowy Młyn =

Borowy Młyn may refer to the following places in Poland:

- Borowy Młyn, Bytów County in Pomeranian Voivodeship (north Poland)
- Borowy Młyn, Kwidzyń County in Pomeranian Voivodeship (north Poland)
- Borowy Młyn, Kuyavian-Pomeranian Voivodeship (north-central Poland)
- Borowy Młyn, Greater Poland Voivodeship (west-central Poland)
- Borowy Młyn, Lubusz Voivodeship (west Poland)
- Borowy Młyn, Warmian-Masurian Voivodeship (north Poland)
- Borowy Młyn, Kwidzyn County in Pomeranian Voivodeship (north Poland)
