= Jałowiec =

Jałowiec may refer to the following places in Poland:

- Jałowiec, Lower Silesian Voivodeship (south-west Poland)
- Jałowiec, Pomeranian Voivodeship (north Poland)
- Halina Jałowiec (born 1960), Polish chess master
