= Ilievski =

Ilievski (Macedonian: Илиевски, feminine: Ilievska (Macedonian: Илиевска)) is a Macedonian surname. Notable people with the surname include:

- Nikola Ilievski (born 1954), Macedonian football player and manager
- Vlado Ilievski (born 1980), Macedonian basketball player
- Vlatko Ilievski (1985–2018), Macedonian singer

== See also ==
- Dimitar Ilievski-Murato (1953–1989), Macedonian alpinist
