= Matki (disambiguation) =

Matki is a common name for the plant Vigna aconitifolia and its edible seeds

Matki may also refer to:

- Matki (earthen pot)

Places

- Mątki, Pomeranian Voivodeship, Poland
- Mątki, Warmian-Masurian Voivodeship, Poland

== See also ==
- Matka (disambiguation)
