= Murato =

Murato may refer to:

== People ==
Dimitar Ilievski - Murato, the first Macedonian summiter of Mount Everest.

== Places ==
Murato, commune in Haute-Corse department of France.

== Other ==
Murato may also refer to the South American language Candoshi-Shapra.
