= Mątki =

Mątki may refer to:

- Mątki, Pomeranian Voivodeship, Poland
- Mątki, Warmian-Masurian Voivodeship, Poland
