= Matka =

Matka may refer to:

== Places ==
- Matka, Estonia, a village in Lüganuse Parish, Ida-Viru County, Estonia
- Matka Canyon, a canyon in the Republic of North Macedonia
- Matka, Raebareli, a village in Uttar Pradesh, India
- Matka, Saraj, a village in Saraj Municipality, Republic of North Macedonia

== Other ==
- Matka (film), a 2024 Indian Telugu-language film
- Matka (silk), a type of coarse silk fabric in ancient India
- Matka-class missile boat, a group of hydrofoil missile boats built for the Soviet Navy
- Matka gambling or satta gambling, a type of betting and lottery in India
- Matki (earthen pot), also matka, an Indian water jar
- Ghatam or matka, an Indian percussion instrument
- Matka, a 1988 opera by Annette Schlünz
- Mother (opera) (Czech: Matka), a 1929 quarter-tone opera by Alois Hába
- The Mother (Čapek play) (Czech: Matka), a 1938 play by Karel Čapek

== See also ==
- Matki (disambiguation)
