= Wiszary =

- Village
- Location within Poland
- Coordinates: 53°49′34″N 19°0′9″E
- Country: Poland
- Voivodeship: Pomeranian
- County: Kwidzyn
- Gmina: Ryjewo

Wiszary [viˈʂarɨ] is a village in the administrative district of Gmina Ryjewo, within Kwidzyn County, Pomeranian Voivodeship, in northern Poland.

For the history of the region, see History of Pomerania.
