= Paul Brandt (pilot) =

German fighter ace and Knight's Cross recipient (1915–1944)

- Born: 29 April 1915; Rehhof
- Died: 24 December 1944 (aged 29) over Münster
- Cause of death: Killed in action
- Military career
- Allegiance: Nazi Germany
- Branch: Luftwaffe
- Rank: Leutnant (second lieutenant)
- Unit: JG 54
- Commands: 16./JG 54
- Conflicts: World War II: Eastern Front; Defense of the Reich
- Awards: Knight's Cross of the Iron Cross

Paul Brandt (29 April 1915 – 24 December 1944) was a German Luftwaffe ace and recipient of the Knight's Cross of the Iron Cross during World War II. The Knight's Cross of the Iron Cross was the highest award in the military and paramilitary forces of Nazi Germany during World War II. Brandt was killed in action near Münster on 24 December 1944. During his career, depending on source, he was credited between 29 and 34 aerial victories, claimed in over 500 combat missions.

== Early life and career ==
Brandt was born on 29 April 1915 in Rehhof, now Ryjewo in northern Poland, then in West Prussia within the German Empire. He joined the military service of the Luftwaffe and following flight and fighter pilot training, (Note: Flight training in the Luftwaffe progressed through the levels A1, A2 and B1, B2, referred to as A/B flight training. A training included theoretical and practical training in aerobatics, navigation, long-distance flights and dead-stick landings. The B courses included high-altitude flights, instrument flights, night landings and training to handle the aircraft in difficult situations.) Brandt was posted to the 3. Staffel (3rd squadron) of Jagdgeschwader 54 (JG 54—54th Fighter Wing) in October 1941. At the time, 3. Staffel was commanded by Oberleutnant Hans Schmoller-Haldy and was subordinated to I. Gruppe (1st group) of JG 54 which was headed by Hauptmann Erich von Selle.

== World War II ==
On Friday 1 September 1939 German forces had invaded Poland which marked the beginning of World War II, and in June 1941, Germany had invaded the Soviet Union which created the Eastern Front. On 22 October 1941, I. Gruppe of JG 54 moved from Ziverskaya to Krasnogvardeysk, now Gatchina, where they fought in Siege of Leningrad. Here on 3 December, Brandt claimed his first aerial victory when he shot down a Polikarpov I-16 fighter.

=== As a fighter bomber pilot ===
In mid-April 1943, a newly formed Jabostaffel, a specialized fighter bomber squadron, was formed and labeled 13.(Jabo) Staffel of JG 54 and placed under the command of Hauptmann Gerhard Koall. This Staffel was then became the 10.(Jabo) Staffel of Jagdgeschwader 26 on 31 May before it became the 4.(Jabo) Staffel of JG 54 on 1 July. Initially, the Jabostaffel was based at Gatchina and was equipped with the Focke-Wulf Fw 190 A-5. The unit flew its first combat missions on 10 May.

On 19 July, the Jabostaffel attacked trains running between Volkhov and Shum, located approximately 40 kilometers (25 miles) west of Volkhov. In addition, the Staffel flew combat air patrols in under control of IV. Gruppe. On one of these missions, Brandt claimed a Yakovlev Yak-1 fighter shot down northeast of Putilowo, located 25 kilometers (16 miles) northwest of Leningrad. While serving in the Jabostaffel, Brandt was awarded the Honor Goblet of the Luftwaffe (Ehrenpokal der Luftwaffe) on 26 July and the German Cross in Gold (Deutsches Kreuz in Gold) on 17 October.

On 7 February 1944, Brandt made a belly landing in his Fw 190 A at Dorpat. Other than no combat damage was sustained, the cause for this belly landing are unknown. In March, Brandt was transferred to Ergänzungs-Jagdgruppe Ost, a supplementary training unit, where served as a flight instructor, sharing his combat experience with new fighter pilots destined for the Eastern Front. He served in this capacity until August when he was transferred to 15. Staffel of JG 54 a squadron of IV. Gruppe.

=== Western Front ===
On 14 September, IV. Gruppe was withdrawn from the Eastern Front and relocated to Löbnitz. Three days later, the Allied Forces launched Operation Market Garden to seize the bridges to Arnhem. This forced the urgent transfer of IV. Gruppe of JG 54 to Plantlünne where the unit was subordinated to the 3. Jagd Division (3rd Fighter Division). Here on 26 September, Brandt claimed his first aerial victory on the Western Front when he shot down a Stinson L-1 Vigilant aircraft. The next day, he was awarded the Knight's Cross of the Iron Cross (Ritterkreuz des Eisernen Kreuzes) for his achievements as a ground-attack pilot and his aerial victories claimed.

On 26 and 27 November, IV. Gruppe was subordinated to Jagdgeschwader 27 (JG 27—27th Fighter Wing) and augmented Luftflotte Reich (Air Fleet Reich) combatting the United States Army Air Forces (USAAF) Eighth Air Force attacking German fuel production. On 26 November, the Gruppe claimed seven aerial victories over Boeing B-17 Flying Fortress bombers, including one by Brandt, all of which later confirmed as an Herausschuss (separation shot)—a severely damaged heavy bomber forced to separate from its combat box which was counted as an aerial victory.

=== Squadron leader and death ===
On 26 November 1944, Brandt was appointed Staffelführer (squadron leader on probation) of 16. Staffel of JG 54. He replaced Oberleutnant Heinrich Sterr who had been killed in action that day. Less than a month later on 24 December, Brand was shot down and killed in aerial combat near Münster. His Fw 190 A-8 (Werknummer 682024—factory number) crashed 1 kilometer (0.62 miles) north of Coerde, now part of Münster. Brandt was likely shot down by Royal Air Force Hawker Tempest fighters from No. 274 Squadron. According to Dixon and Obermaier however, the cause of his death was technical malfunction of his Fw 190. Brandt is buried in the military section of Lauheide cemetery (Field A—Grave 179).

== Summary of career ==
=== Aerial victory claims ===
According to Scutts Brandt was credited with 34 aerial victories. Obermaier lists him with 30 aerial victories claimed in over 500 combat missions. Mathews and Foreman, authors of Luftwaffe Aces — Biographies and Victory Claims, researched the German Federal Archives and found records for 29 aerial victory claims, 25 of which on the Eastern Front and four on the Western Front.

Chronicle of aerial victories
This along with the * (asterisk) indicates an Herausschuss (separation shot)—a severely damaged heavy bomber forced to separate from his combat box which was counted as an aerial victory. This and the ? (question mark) indicates information discrepancies listed by Prien, Stemmer, Rodeike, Balke, Bock, Mathews and Foreman.
Claim	Date	Time	Type	Location	Claim	Date	Time	Type	Location
– 3. Staffel of Jagdgeschwader 54 – Operation Barbarossa — 22 June – 5 December 1941
1	3 December 1941	12:14	I-16						
– 3. Staffel of Jagdgeschwader 54 – Eastern Front — 6 December 1941 – 30 April 1942
2	9 January 1942	14:25	Il-2		4	30 April 1942	16:28	Yak-1	
3	23 February 1942	09:00	P-40						
– 3. Staffel of Jagdgeschwader 54 – Eastern Front — 1 May 1942 – 3 February 1943
5	14 May 1942	17:50? (Note: According to Mathews and Foreman claimed at 17:51.)	I-180 (Yak-7)		7	26 August 1942	06:05	MiG-3	PQ 47684; 15 km (9.3 mi) northeast of Zubtsov
6	8 July 1942	07:05	Pe-2		8	2 September 1942	12:25	MiG-3	PQ 00283; 20 km (12 mi) west of Mga
– 4.(Jabo) Staffel of Jagdgeschwader 54 – Eastern Front — 1 May – 31 December 1943
9	19 July 1943	18:10	Yak-1	PQ 36 Ost 10214; 45 km (28 mi) west of Volkhov	17	4 August 1943	10:17	Il-2	north of Voronov
10	22 July 1943	06:53	Pe-2	1 km (0.62 mi) west of Gorodok	? (Note: This claim is not listed by Prien, Stemmer, Rodeike and Bock.)	15 September 1943	14:10	Il-2	southeast of Shlisselburg
11	25 July 1943	04:46	La-5	PQ 36 Ost 10372; 25 km (16 mi) south of Mga	18	15 September 1943	17:43	Il-2	PQ 36 Ost 10152 southeast of Shlisselburg
12	27 July 1943	16:55	Il-2	PQ 36 Ost 10351; 20 km (12 mi) southeast of Mga	19	24 September 1943	11:53	Il-2	PQ 36 Ost 10141 south of Shlisselburg
13	27 July 1943	16:56	Il-2	PQ 36 Ost 10352; 20 km (12 mi) southeast of Mga	20	12 October 1943	11:58	Pe-2	PQ 35 Ost 07673; 10 km (6.2 mi) southeast of Velikiye Luki
14	27 July 1943	16:57	LaGG-3	PQ 36 Ost 10363; 25 km (16 mi) southeast of Mga	21	5 November 1943	08:12	Yak-9	PQ 35 Ost 06153, 20 km (12 mi) southeast of Nevel
15	28 July 1943	12:24	La-5	PQ 36 Ost 10113 vicinity of Shlisselburg	22	11 December 1943	09:15	Il-2	PQ 25 Ost 96212; 20 km (12 mi) west-southwest of Nevel
16	30 July 1943	03:45	Il-2	PQ 36 Ost 1044					
– 4.(Jabo) Staffel of Jagdgeschwader 54 – Eastern Front — 1 January – 29 February 1944
23	7 February 1944	13:34	La-5	PQ 36 Ost 00513 vicinity of Hungerburg	24	15 February 1944	14:58	Pe-2	PQ 26 Ost 8037
– 15. Staffel of Jagdgeschwader 54 – Defense of the Reich — 18 September – 26 November 1944
25	26 September 1944	14:10	Vigilant	PQ 05 Ost 52291	26? (Note: This claim is not listed by Mathews and Foreman.)	26 November 1944	—	B-17*	
– 16. Staffel of Jagdgeschwader 54 – Defense of the Reich — 27 November – 24 December 1944
27?	28 November 1944	—	P-47	15 km (9.3 mi) southwest of Cologne	29	18 December 1944	10:45	P-47	PQ 05 Ost S/OO-2; Loppersum
28	17 December 1944	15:12	P-38	PQ 05 Ost S/PN-8 southeast of St. Vith	30	18 December 1944	14:05	P-51	PQ 05 Ost S/PN-4 southeast of Malmedy

=== Awards ===
- Iron Cross (1939) 2nd and 1st Class
- Honor Goblet of the Luftwaffe on 26 July 1943 as Feldwebel and pilot
- German Cross in Gold on 17 October 1943 as Feldwebel in the II./Jagdgeschwader 54
- Knight's Cross of the Iron Cross on 5 September 1944 as Oberfeldwebel and pilot in the IV./Jagdgeschwader 54
