= Szadówko =

- Settlement
- Location within Poland
- Coordinates: 53°51′N 18°53′E
- Country: Poland
- Voivodeship: Pomeranian
- County: Kwidzyn
- Gmina: Ryjewo

Szadówko [ʂaˈdufkɔ] is a settlement in the administrative district of Gmina Ryjewo, within Kwidzyn County, Pomeranian Voivodeship, in northern Poland.

For the history of the region, see History of Pomerania.
