= Rudniki, Kwidzyn County =

Rudniki
- Village
- Location within Poland
- Coordinates: 53°51′46″N 18°53′23″E
- Country: Poland
- Voivodeship: Pomeranian
- County: Kwidzyn
- Gmina: Ryjewo
- Population: 113

Rudniki ([rudˈniki]) (German: Rudnerweide) is a village in the administrative district of Gmina Ryjewo, within Kwidzyn County, Pomeranian Voivodeship, in northern Poland.

For the history of the region, see History of Pomerania.
