= Watkowice Małe =

- Village
- Location within Poland
- Coordinates: 53°50′28″N 19°3′30″E
- Country: Poland
- Voivodeship: Pomeranian
- County: Kwidzyn
- Gmina: Ryjewo
- Population: 175

Watkowice Małe [vatkɔˈvit͡sɛ ˈmawɛ] is a village in the administrative district of Gmina Ryjewo, within Kwidzyn County, Pomeranian Voivodeship, in northern Poland.

== Notable residents ==
- Carl Julius Meyer von Klinggräff (1809–1879), German botanist
- Hugo Erich Meyer von Klinggräff (1820-1902), German botanist
