= Mątowskie Pastwiska =

- Village
- Location within Poland
- Coordinates: 53°50′52″N 18°56′4″E
- Country: Poland
- Voivodeship: Pomeranian
- County: Kwidzyn
- Gmina: Ryjewo
- Population: 249

Mątowskie Pastwiska ([mɔnˈtɔfskʲɛ pastˈfiska]) (German: Montauerweide) is a village in the administrative district of Gmina Ryjewo, within Kwidzyn County, Pomeranian Voivodeship, in northern Poland.

For the history of the region, see History of Pomerania.
