= Sołtyski =

- Settlement
- Location within Poland
- Coordinates: 53°53′13″N 18°55′21″E
- Country: Poland
- Voivodeship: Pomeranian
- County: Kwidzyn
- Gmina: Ryjewo
- Population: 49

Sołtyski [sɔu̯ˈtɨski] is a settlement in the administrative district of Gmina Ryjewo, within Kwidzyn County, Pomeranian Voivodeship, in northern Poland.

For the history of the region, see History of Pomerania.
