= Gmina Ryjewo =

Gmina Ryjewo Ryjewo Commune
- Gmina
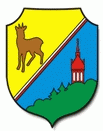
- Coat of arms
- Interactive map of Gmina Ryjewo
- Coordinates (Ryjewo): 53°50′39″N 18°57′38″E
- Country: Poland
- Voivodeship: Pomeranian
- County: Kwidzyn
- Seat: Ryjewo

Area
  - Total: 103.28 km^{2} (39.88 sq mi)

Population (2022)
  - Total: 5,627
  - Density: 54.48/km^{2} (141.1/sq mi)
- Website: http://www.ryjewo.pl

Gmina Ryjewo is a rural gmina (administrative district) in Kwidzyn County, Pomeranian Voivodeship, in northern Poland. Its seat is the village of Ryjewo, which lies approximately 13 kilometres (8 mi) north of Kwidzyn and 62 km (39 mi) south of the regional capital Gdańsk.

The gmina covers an area of 103.28 square kilometres (39.9 sq mi), and as of 2022 its total population is 5,627.

== Villages ==
Gmina Ryjewo contains the villages and settlements of Barcice, Benowo, Benowo-Wrzosy, Borowy Młyn, Chojno, Czarne Błoto, Jałowiec, Jarzębina, Klecewko, Kuliki, Mątki, Mątowskie Pastwiska, Pańskie Łąki, Pułkowice, Rudniki, Ryjewo, Sołtyski, Straszewo, Szadówko, Szkaradowo Szlacheckie, Szkaradowo Wielkie, Tralewo, Trzciano, Watkowice, Watkowice Małe and Wiszary.

== Neighbouring gminas ==
Gmina Ryjewo is bordered by the gminas of Gniew, Kwidzyn, Mikołajki Pomorskie, Prabuty and Sztum.
