= Czarne Błoto, Pomeranian Voivodeship =

Czarne Błoto
- Settlement
- Location within Poland
- Coordinates: 53°49′19″N 19°5′15″E
- Country: Poland
- Voivodeship: Pomeranian
- County: Kwidzyn
- Gmina: Ryjewo

Czarne Błoto [ˈt͡ʂarnɛ ˈbwɔtɔ] is a settlement in the administrative district of Gmina Ryjewo, within Kwidzyn County, Pomeranian Voivodeship, in northern Poland.

For the history of the region, see History of Pomerania.
