= Barcice, Pomeranian Voivodeship =

Barcice
- Village
- Location within Poland
- Coordinates: 53°52′28″N 18°56′21″E
- Country: Poland
- Voivodeship: Pomeranian
- County: Kwidzyn
- Gmina: Ryjewo
- Population: 371

Barcice (Polish: [barˈt͡ɕit͡sɛ]) (German: Tragheimerweide) is a village in the administrative district of Gmina Ryjewo, within Kwidzyn County, Pomeranian Voivodeship, in northern Poland.

For the history of the region, see History of Pomerania.
