= Jarzębina, Pomeranian Voivodeship =

Jarzębina
- Village
- Location within Poland
- Coordinates: 53°52′19″N 18°53′10″E
- Country: Poland
- Voivodeship: Pomeranian
- County: Kwidzyn
- Gmina: Ryjewo
- Population: 109

Jarzębina ([jaʐɛmˈbina]) (German: Schulwiese) is a village in the administrative district of Gmina Ryjewo, within Kwidzyn County, Pomeranian Voivodeship, in northern Poland.

For the history of the region, see History of Pomerania.
