= Klecewko =

- Village
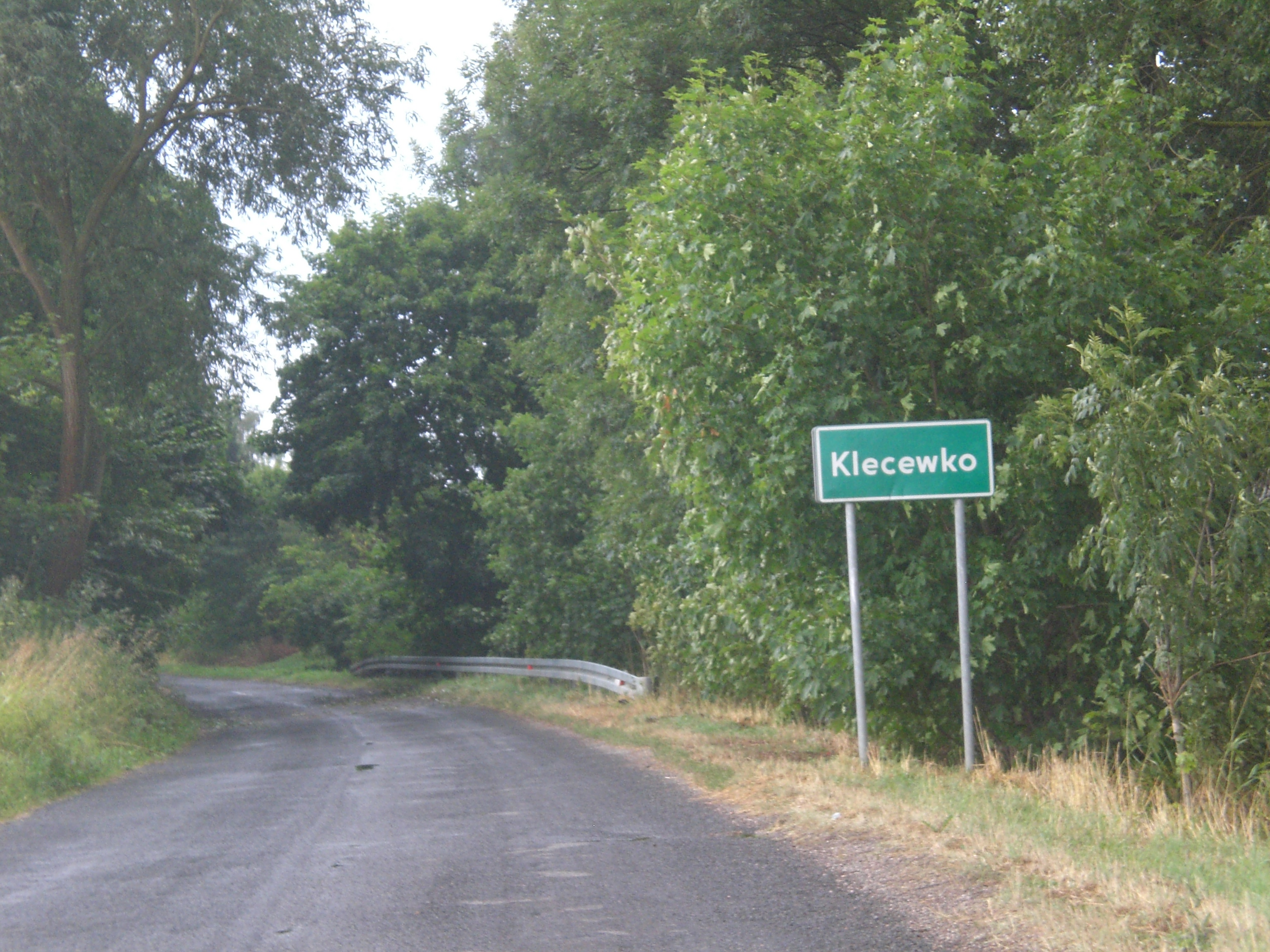

- Location within Poland
- Coordinates: 53°50′16″N 19°1′8″E
- Country: Poland
- Voivodeship: Pomeranian
- County: Kwidzyn
- Gmina: Ryjewo
- Population: 135

Klecewko [klɛˈt͡sɛfkɔ] is a village in the administrative district of Gmina Ryjewo, within Kwidzyn County, Pomeranian Voivodeship, in northern Poland.

For the history of the region, see History of Pomerania.
