= Trzciano, Pomeranian Voivodeship =

Trzciano
- Village
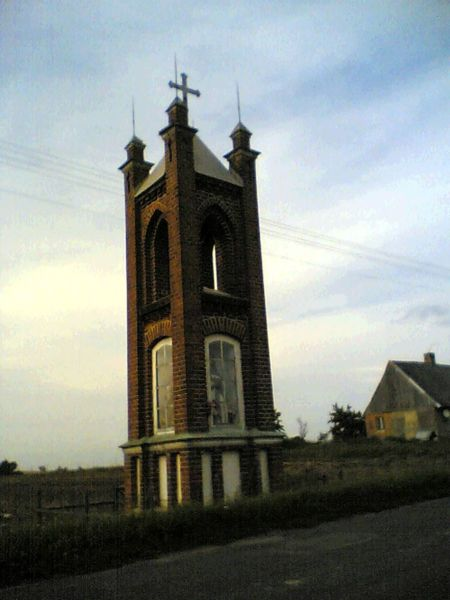
- Shrine (built 1819) commemorating the 1629 battle with Sweden

- Location within Poland
- Coordinates: 53°48′2″N 19°3′47″E
- Country: Poland
- Voivodeship: Pomeranian
- County: Kwidzyn
- Gmina: Ryjewo
- Population: 433

Trzciano [ˈtʂt͡ɕanɔ] (German: Honigfelde, formerly also Königfelde) is a village in the administrative district of Gmina Ryjewo, within Kwidzyn County, Pomeranian Voivodeship, in northern Poland.

== History ==
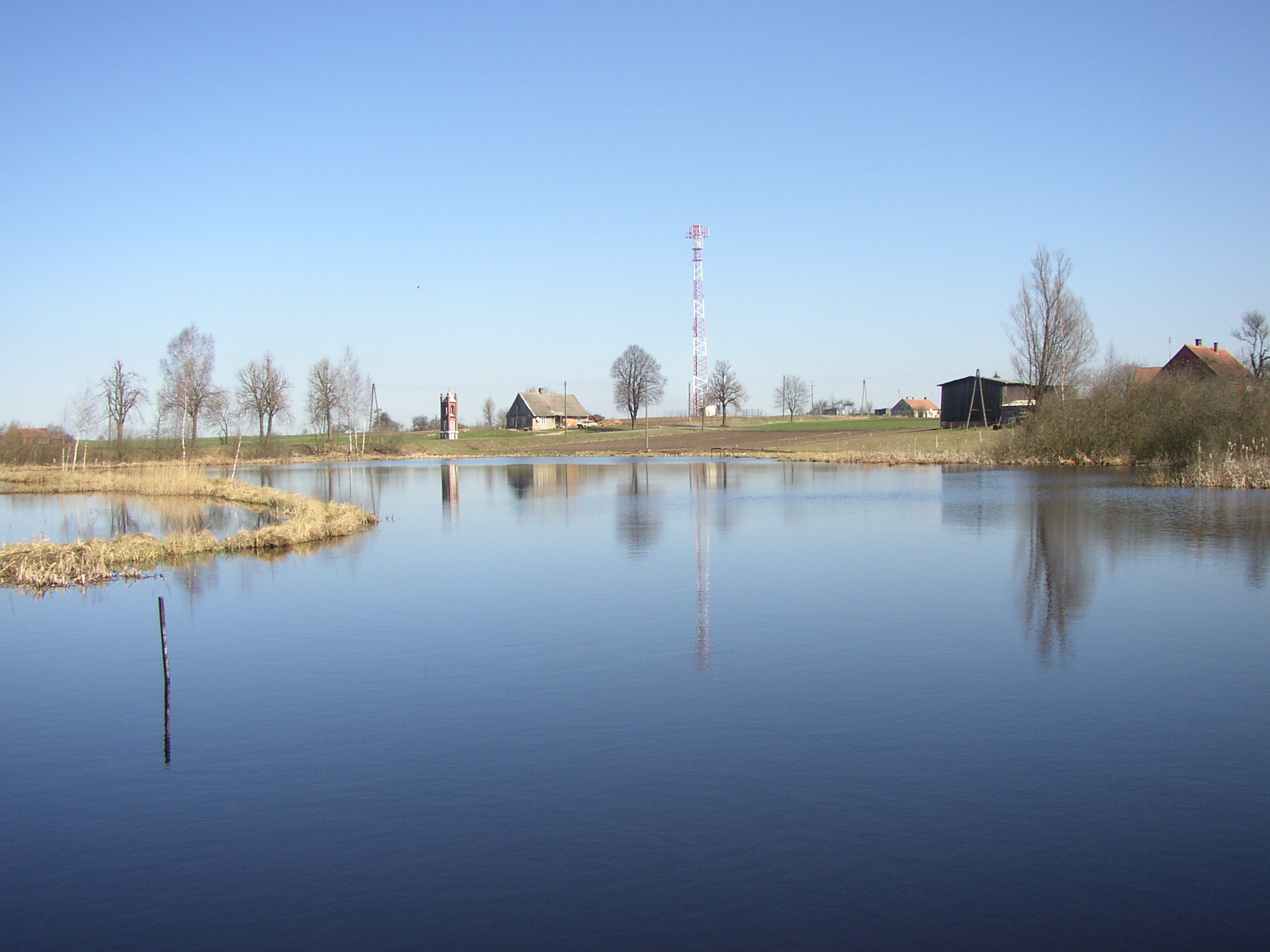
Lake in Trzciano, legendary resting place of King Gustavus of Sweden's mace

The village was created by the Teutonic Order in the mid-14th century. The first documentary evidence of the settlement is found in medieval books where it is referred to as Honigfelde (German, field of honey). Later, the name was unintentionally transcribed as Königfelde (German, field of kings). It appears on many old maps of Pomerania under these names, as well as in double-barrelled forms such as Honig feldt.

At the end of the Thirteen Years' War in 1466 Honigfelde became a part of Polish province Royal Prussia. At the beginning of the 16th century it became a possession of Brandt family.

In the 17th century, during the Swedish occupation known as The Deluge, the village was witness to many important Polish and Swedish military engagements. In 1629 the Battle of Trzciana between these two countries ended in the victory of Polish hetman Stanisław Koniecpolski over Gustavus Adolphus. This defeat finally compelled the Swedish army to leave Poland and to retreat over the Baltic Sea. A small shrine was built to commemorate Koniecpolski's victory, and there is also a memorial stone.

A local legend tells that as the vanquished King Gustavus Adolphus of Sweden fled in despair across a lake, he dropped his mace into the water, symbolically ending his reign. According to the legend, the mace remains to this day at the bottom of the lake.

The battle is mentioned in Polish chronicles as bitwa pod Trzcianką (the battle in Trzcianka), "Trzcianka" being the name of Trzciano in use during the 17th and 18th centuries. That name evolved from the Polish word trzcina, which means reed. In Polish usage the name of the village changed to "Trzciana" and finally, in the 19th century, to its current form, Trzciano.

In 1772 during the First partition of Poland the area (Royal Prussia) became part of the Kingdom of Prussia in the newly created province of West Prussia. After World War I and the East Prussian plebiscite the town was part of Weimar Germany. After World War II the area returned to Poland.

== Sports ==
Trzciano has its own football club, called Rodło Trzciano.
