= Benowo-Wrzosy =

- Settlement
- Location within Poland
- Coordinates: 53°52′58″N 18°56′17″E
- Country: Poland
- Voivodeship: Pomeranian
- County: Kwidzyn
- Gmina: Ryjewo

Benowo-Wrzosy [bɛˈnɔvɔ ˈvʐɔsɨ] is a settlement in the administrative district of Gmina Ryjewo, within Kwidzyn County, Pomeranian Voivodeship, in northern Poland.

For the history of the region, see History of Pomerania.
