= Chojno, Kwidzyn County =

Chojno
- Settlement
- Location within Poland
- Coordinates: 53°48′26″N 19°5′42″E
- Country: Poland
- Voivodeship: Pomeranian
- County: Kwidzyn
- Gmina: Ryjewo

Chojno (Polish pronunciation: [ˈxɔjnɔ]) is a settlement in the administrative district of Gmina Ryjewo, within Kwidzyn County, Pomeranian Voivodeship, in northern Poland.

For the history of the region, see History of Pomerania.
