= Heinrich Sterr =

German World War II fighter pilot (1919–1944)

- Born: 24 September 1919; Ortenburg, Vilshofen
- Died: 26 November 1944 (aged 25) airport of Vörden/Bramsche
- Cause of death: Killed in action
- Military career
- Allegiance: Nazi Germany
- Branch: Luftwaffe
- Service years: 1939–1944
- Rank: Oberleutnant (first lieutenant)
- Unit: JG 54
- Commands: 16./JG 54
- Conflicts: World War II
- Awards: Knight's Cross of the Iron Cross

Heinrich Sterr (24 September 1919 – 26 November 1944) was a World War II Luftwaffe military aviator. As a flying ace, he is credited with 130 aerial victories predominantly claimed on the Eastern Front. He was a recipient of the Knight's Cross of the Iron Cross, the highest award in the military and paramilitary forces of Nazi Germany during World War II. On 26 November 1944, he was shot down and killed in action by USAAF fighters.

== Early life and career ==
Sterr was born on 24 September 1919 in Ortenburg, Lower Bavaria as part of the Free State of Bavaria. Unlike many other flying aces in the Luftwaffe, he was not a member of the pre-war Luftwaffe (he had only just turned 20 when war broke out) and he missed the early warfare over Poland, France and the first year in the East. After completing his pilot-training in 1942, (Note: Flight training in the Luftwaffe progressed through the levels A1, A2 and B1, B2, referred to as A/B flight training. A training included theoretical and practical training in aerobatics, navigation, long-distance flights and dead-stick landings. The B courses included high-altitude flights, instrument flights, night landings and training to handle the aircraft in difficult situations.) Sterr was sent as an Unteroffizier, to 6. Staffel (6th squadron) of Jagdgeschwader 54 (JG 54—54th Fighter Wing), a squadron of II. Gruppe (2nd group).

== World War II ==
World War II in Europe had begun on Friday, 1 September 1939, when German forces invaded Poland. In June 1941, German forces had launched Operation Barbarossa, the invasion of the Soviet Union. At the time of Sterr's posting to JG 54, II. Gruppe was based at Ryelbitzi, west of Lake Ilmen covering the battles around Demyansk Pocket as the Soviets continued to try and break through the German forces in front of Leningrad where he scored his first victory on 6 April when he shot down a Mikoyan-Gurevich MiG-3 fighter aircraft.

In late 1942, II. Gruppe was scheduled to be reequipped with the Focke-Wulf Fw 190 A-4 at Heiligenbeil, present-day Mamonovo. On 7 January 1943, Sterr was shot down and wounded in his Messerschmitt Bf 109 G-2 (Werknummer 13609—factory number) by Lavochkin-Gorbunov-Gudkov LaGG-3 fighters in the vicinity of Ramushevo on the Lovat River. By the end of March 1943, Sterr had over 30 victories, and on 30 April he was awarded the Honour Goblet of the Luftwaffe (Ehrenpokal der Luftwaffe). In June, Luftflotte 1 staged a last big effort to blow the railway bridges of the vital supply link to Leningrad. In July, most other fighter Gruppen were assembled around the Kursk salient for the next German offensive - Operation Zitadelle. Although II./JG 54 was kept back guarding Leningrad, it appears several of its pilots, including Oberfeldwebel Sterr, went with II. Gruppe to Orel. In the fortnight or so that it was where he scored a further ten victories to add to his tally of shootdowns. On 23 July, he was awarded the German Cross in Gold (Deutsches Kreuz in Gold).

On 12 September 1943, Hauptmann Erich Rudorffer, at the time Sterr's group commander, filed a special report requesting his promotion to wartime officer. On 16 September, Major Hubertus von Bonin, wing commander of JG 54, concurred in the assessment, emphasizing on his ability as a mentor to other pilots, and stated that Sterr is well suited for promotion to wartime officer. In consequence, Sterr was promoted to Leutnant (second lieutenant) on 1 November 1943 with a rank age dated 1 January 1944.

Eventually the German forces were stretched too thin across the Eastern Front to provide constant air cover and were increasingly being used as "fire brigades", as new Soviet offensives broke out up and down the line. Sterr's victory list is a case in point, on the nomadic existence of II./JG 54 from here on: early August gave 15 victories over Leningrad, then later in the month a clutch of victories south-east of Smolensk. On 8 October 1943, Sterr became an "ace-in-a-day" for the second time, claiming six Lavochkin La-5 fighters shot down north of Kiev. (Note: The authors place this combat over Lake Ladoga.) That day, Sterr was also shot down in his Fw 190 A-6 (Werknummer 530353) 3 kilometres (1.9 miles) northeast of Dymer. He managed to bail out but was wounded nevertheless.

Oberfeldwebel Sterr was awarded the Knight's Cross of the Iron Cross (Ritterkreuz des Eisernen Kreuzes) on 5 December 1943 (nominally for 86 victories) and sent home for officer-training. Returning as a Leutnant in January he was back to Ukraine where he shot down more Soviet aircraft. On 31 March 1944, Sterr was credited with his 100th aerial victory, making him the 68th Luftwaffe pilot to achieve the century mark. In March, he was then briefly posted to 3. Staffel of JG 54 in Estonia for a couple of months. On 3 April, Sterr was appointed Staffelkapitän (squadron leader) of 6. Staffel of JG 54, replacing Leutnant Albin Wolf who had been killed in action the day before. On 29, II. Gruppe received orders to send a fully staffed Staffel for fighting in defense of the Reich. In consequence, 6. Staffel, augmented by pilots from the other Staffeln, was detached and became a fourth Staffel of IV. Gruppe of JG 54.

IV. Gruppe of JG 54 had been withdrawn from the Eastern Front on 25 May and sent to Illesheim Airfield for conversion training to the Fw 190. Here, the Gruppe was placed under command of Major Wolfgang Späte and was joined by the pilots of 6. Staffel led by Sterr. On 22 June, Soviet forces launched Operation Bagration, attacking Army Group Centre in Byelorussia, with the objective of encircling and destroying its main component armies. In consequence, IV. Gruppe was not sent to the Western Front but was ordered to relocate east on 26 June. The following day, the Gruppe arrived at an airfield near Baranavichy located approximately 130 kilometers (81 miles) southwest of Minsk. On 20 August, the Jagdwaffe (Luftwaffe fighter force) had a major unit re-organization. Within IV. Gruppe, the 10. Staffel became the 13., the 11. was renamed to 14., the 12. to 15., and Sterr's 6. Staffel was made the 16. Staffel of JG 54.

=== Defense of the Reich ===
On 14 September, IV. Gruppe was withdrawn from the Eastern Front and relocated to Löbnitz. Three days later, the Allied Forces launched Operation Market Garden to seize the bridges to Arnhem. This forced the urgent transfer of IV. Gruppe of JG 54 to Plantlünne where the unit was subordinated to the 3. Jagd Division (3rd Fighter Division). This was now a different air war - not the low-level dogfighting and pursuits of the Eastern Front, but the high-altitude engagement against the massive American bomber formations, and their hundreds of escort fighters. With such odds stacked against them, it was often just luck if a pilot would survive. In just 3 weeks, IV. Gruppe of JG 54 lost 30 pilots for only 10 victories - and was soon pulled out the line to reform for the second time in a month.

Flying Fw 190 A-8 (Werknummer 171684), Sterr was killed in action on 26 November 1944 during his landing approach at an airfield at Vörden. He was shot down by a Republic P-47 Thunderbolt piloted by Captain P.L. Larsen from the 78th Fighter Group. He was nominated for the Knight's Cross of the Iron Cross with Oak Leaves (Ritterkreuz des Eisernen Kreuzes mit Eichenlaub). He was succeeded by Leutnant Paul Brandt as commander of 16. Staffel of JG 54.

== Summary of career ==
=== Aerial victory claims ===
According to US historian David T. Zabecki, Sterr was credited with 129 aerial victories. Spick lists Sterr with 130 aerial victories in an unknown number of combat missions, all but three on the Eastern Front. Mathews and Foreman, authors of Luftwaffe Aces — Biographies and Victory Claims, researched the German Federal Archives and found records for 108 aerial victories, all but two claimed on the Eastern Front.

Victory claims were logged to a map-reference (PQ = Planquadrat), for example "PQ 28142". The Luftwaffe grid map (Jägermeldenetz) covered all of Europe, western Russia and North Africa and was composed of rectangles measuring 15 minutes of latitude by 30 minutes of longitude, an area of about 360 square miles (930 km^{2}). These sectors were then subdivided into 36 smaller units to give a location area 3 km × 4 km (1.9 mi × 2.5 mi) in size.

Chronicle of aerial victories
This and the ♠ (Ace of spades) indicates those aerial victories which made Sterr an "ace-in-a-day", a term which designates a fighter pilot who has shot down five or more airplanes in a single day. This and the ! (exclamation mark) indicates information discrepancies listed by Prien, Stemmer, Rodeike, Bock, Mathews and Foreman.
Claim	Date	Time	Type	Location	Claim	Date	Time	Type	Location
– 6. Staffel of Jagdgeschwader 54 – Eastern Front — 20 January – 30 April 1942
1	6 April 1942	14:05	MiG-3						
– 6. Staffel of Jagdgeschwader 54 – Eastern Front — 1 May 1942 – 3 February 1943
2	9 June 1942	10:04	Pe-2		9	25 December 1942	12:13	Il-2	2 km (1.2 mi) southeast of Strelitzky
3	19 July 1942	14:44	Il-2	Pola railway station	10	29 December 1942	11:05	LaGG-3	PQ 28142; 30 km (19 mi) northwest of Demyansk
4	28 September 1942	13:06? (Note: According to Mathews and Foreman claimed at 13:15.)	LaGG-3	PQ 18242; 20 km (12 mi) southeast of Staraya Russa	11	29 December 1942	12:45? (Note: According to Mathews and Foreman claimed at 12:40.)	Il-2	PQ 28171; 25 km (16 mi) west-northwest of Demyansk
5	29 September 1942	09:05	Yak-1	PQ 18254; 20 km (12 mi) southeast of Staraya Russa	12	30 December 1942	09:45	Il-2	PQ 28114; 40 km (25 mi) northwest of Demyansk
6	6 December 1942	12:30	Pe-2	PQ 28354; 10 km (6.2 mi) west of Demyansk	13	30 December 1942	12:17	LaGG-3	PQ 18262; 30 km (19 mi) east-southeast of Staraya Russa
7	12 December 1942	14:00	LaGG-3	10 km (6.2 mi) east of Lake Werchne	14	7 January 1943	10:50	LaGG-3	PQ 18294; 40 km (25 mi) southeast of Staraya Russa
8	17 December 1942	13:50	LaGG-3	PQ 28653; 30 km (19 mi) south-southeast of Demyansk	15	25 January 1943	09:53	LaGG-3	PQ 00291; 10 km (6.2 mi) west of Mga
– 6. Staffel of Jagdgeschwader 54 – Eastern Front — 4 February – 31 December 1943
16	11 February 1943	10:19	La-5	PQ 36 Ost 10621; 25 km (16 mi) northeast of Lyuban	46	13 July 1943	14:14	Il-2	PQ 35 Ost 63273; 30 km (19 mi) northwest of Bolkhov
17	23 February 1943	13:47	P-40	PQ 35 Ost 19842; 20 km (12 mi) northeast of Staraya Russa	47	13 July 1943	14:16	Il-2	PQ 35 Ost 63254; 40 km (25 mi) east-southeast of Oryol
18	27 February 1943	15:26	P-40	PQ 35 Ost 28311; 20 km (12 mi) west-northwest of Demyansk	48	14 July 1943	14:15	LaGG-3	PQ 35 Ost 54362; 45 km (28 mi) east-southeast of Zhizdra
19	27 February 1943	15:38	La-5	PQ 35 Ost 18492; 30 km (19 mi) west-southwest of Demyansk	49	14 July 1943	14:20	LaGG-3	PQ 35 Ost 54333; 45 km (28 mi) east-southeast of Zhizdra
20	28 February 1943	13:55	Pe-2	PQ 35 Ost 18382; 45 km (28 mi) north of Chełm	50	17 July 1943	06:47	La-5	PQ 35 Ost 54613; 25 km (16 mi) west of Bolkhov
21	28 February 1943	13:57	LaGG-3	PQ 35 Ost 18382; 45 km (28 mi) north of Chełm	51	18 July 1943	19:18	La-5	PQ 35 Ost 54455; 25 km (16 mi) northwest of Bolkhov
22	5 March 1943	16:16	La-5	PQ 35 Ost 18364; 40 km (25 mi) south of Staraya Russa	52	19 July 1943	11:41	Yak-7	PQ 35 Ost 54623; 20 km (12 mi) west of Bolkhov
23	5 March 1943	16:17	La-5	PQ 35 Ost 18362; 40 km (25 mi) south of Staraya Russa	53	19 July 1943	11:43	Yak-7	PQ 35 Ost 54622; 20 km (12 mi) west of Bolkhov
24	7 March 1943	09:22	Pe-2	PQ 35 Ost 18274; 25 km (16 mi) southeast of Staraya Russa	54	21 July 1943	07:13	La-5	PQ 35 Ost 63211; 35 km (22 mi) east of Oryol
25	7 March 1943	15:55	P-39	PQ 35 Ost 18472; 55 km (34 mi) west-southwest of Demyansk	55	28 July 1943	09:15	Pe-2	PQ 36 Ost 10243; 25 km (16 mi) east-southeast of Shlisselburg
26	7 March 1943	15:57	LaGG-3	PQ 35 Ost 18473; 55 km (34 mi) west-southwest of Demyansk	56	28 July 1943	09:18	La-5	PQ 36 Ost 10172 vicinity of Mga
27	14 March 1943	13:58? (Note: According to Mathews and Foreman claimed at 13:52.)	P-40	PQ 35 Ost 18452; 40 km (25 mi) west of Demyansk	57	28 July 1943	14:56	Yak-7	PQ 36 Ost 10441; 30 km (19 mi) southeast of Mga
28	15 March 1943	15:53	LaGG-3	PQ 35 Ost 18272; 25 km (16 mi) southeast of Staraya Russa	58	29 July 1943	08:05	La-5	PQ 36 Ost 10194 east of Mga
29	18 March 1943	09:18	La-5	PQ 35 Ost 18221; 25 km (16 mi) east-southeast of Staraya Russa	59	29 July 1943	08:08	Yak-7	PQ 36 Ost 10413; 25 km (16 mi) east-southeast of Mga
30	19 March 1943	15:24	Pe-2	PQ 36 Ost 00412; 10 km (6.2 mi) east of Pushkin	60	29 July 1943	08:11	Yak-7	PQ 36 Ost 10191 south of Shlisselburg
31	23 March 1943	08:06	P-40	PQ 36 Ost 00411; 10 km (6.2 mi) east of Pushkin	61	31 July 1943	13:54	P-39	PQ 36 Ost 10142 south of Shlisselburg
32	17 May 1943	05:09	La-5	PQ 36 Ost 10742; 30 km (19 mi) south-southwest of Lyuban	62	1 August 1943	06:31	La-5	PQ 36 Ost 10142 south of Shlisselburg
33	22 May 1943	10:56	La-5	PQ 36 Ost 21893	63♠	2 August 1943	10:25	Il-2	PQ 36 Ost 10182 east of Mga
34	22 May 1943	10:58	La-5	PQ 36 Ost 20222	64♠	2 August 1943	12:55	Il-2	PQ 36 Ost 10322; 10 km (6.2 mi) southeast of Mga
35	30 May 1943	13:44	Yak-1	PQ 36 Ost 10113 vicinity of Shlisselburg	65♠	2 August 1943	12:57	Il-2	PQ 36 Ost 10323; 10 km (6.2 mi) southeast of Mga
36	30 May 1943	20:16	P-40	PQ 36 Ost 11773; 30 km (19 mi) northwest of Spaskaja-Polist	66♠	2 August 1943	13:24	La-5	PQ 36 Ost 10331; 20 km (12 mi) east-southeast of Mga
37	3 June 1943	12:57? (Note: According to Mathews and Foreman claimed at 14:57.)	Pe-2	PQ 26 Ost 90141; 30 km (19 mi) west-southwest of Lomomosov	67♠	2 August 1943	13:25	LaGG-3	PQ 36 Ost 10183 east of Mga
38	10 June 1943	15:52	LaGG-3	PQ 26 Ost 90121; 20 km (12 mi) west of Lomomosov	68♠	2 August 1943	17:34	La-5	PQ 36 Ost 10113 vicinity of Shlisselburg
39	17 June 1943	05:07	La-5	PQ 36 Ost 20224; 20 km (12 mi) east of Volkhov	69♠	2 August 1943	19:21	La-5	PQ 36 Ost 10354; 20 km (12 mi) southeast of Mga
40	17 June 1943	05:17	Hurricane	PQ 36 Ost 20174 vicinity of Volkhov	70	11 August 1943	05:10	LaGG-3	PQ 35 Ost 45724; 15 km (9.3 mi) north-northeast of Kirov
41	18 June 1943	12:12	LaGG-3	PQ 36 Ost 10262; 25 km (16 mi) west-southwest of Shlisselburg	71	12 August 1943	07:50	La-5	PQ 35 Ost 45751; 5 km (3.1 mi) northwest of Kirov
42	23 June 1943	20:07	P-39	PQ 36 Ost 11741; 20 km (12 mi) north of Shlisselburg	72	12 August 1943	07:59	La-5	PQ 35 Ost 45761; 5 km (3.1 mi) north-northeast of Kirov
43	24 June 1943	11:11	Yak-1? (Note: According to Mathews and Foreman claimed as a Yakovlev Yak-9.)	PQ 36 Ost 20191 west of Volkhov	73	12 August 1943	16:02	Yak-7	PQ 35 Ost 45742; 15 km (9.3 mi) west of Kirov
44	9 July 1943	08:42	Yak-9	PQ 36 Ost 10264; 25 km (16 mi) west-southwest of Shlisselburg	74	14 August 1943	04:59	La-5	PQ 35 Ost 45751; 5 km (3.1 mi) northwest of Kirov
45	12 July 1943	18:19	La-5	PQ 35 Ost 64882; 25 km (16 mi) southeast of Mtsensk	75	14 August 1943	05:02	La-5	PQ 35 Ost 45753; 5 km (3.1 mi) north of Kirov
The authors Prien, Stemmer, Rodeike and Bock have an unaccounted gap of six aerial victories, ranging from aerial victory 76 to 81. According to Mathews and Foreman, these six aerial victories are also not documented.
82	7 October 1943	13:39	La-5	PQ 35 Ost 11794 over Lake Ladoga	86♠	8 October 1943	05:57	La-5	PQ 35 Ost 01131 over Lake Ladoga
83	7 October 1943	14:03	La-5	PQ 35 Ost 10124 east of Shlisselburg	87♠	8 October 1943	08:24	La-5	PQ 35 Ost 01411 over Lake Ladoga
84♠	8 October 1943	05:51	La-5	PQ 35 Ost 02793	88♠	8 October 1943	08:25	La-5	PQ 35 Ost 01413 over Lake Ladoga
85♠	8 October 1943	05:53	La-5	PQ 35 Ost 02794	89♠	8 October 1943	08:27	La-5	PQ 35 Ost 01413 over Lake Ladoga
– 6. Staffel with II. Gruppe of Jagdgeschwader 54 – Eastern Front — 1 January – 29 May 1944
90	11 January 1944	13:42	Yak-4	PQ 26 Ost 80792; 35 km (22 mi) southeast of Narva	100	31 March 1944	17:12	Pe-2	PQ 25 Ost 78243
91	25 January 1944	10:46	La-5	PQ 26 Ost 90571; 35 km (22 mi) southwest of Lissino	101	1 April 1944	12:45	Yak-9	PQ 25 Ost 88392; 10 km (6.2 mi) southeast of Selo
92	25 January 1944	10:48	Il-2	PQ 26 Ost 80661; 40 km (25 mi) east of Narva	102	2 April 1944	14:40	Il-2	PQ 25 Ost 88413; 10 km (6.2 mi) southwest of Pskov
93	28 January 1944	15:10	La-5	PQ 26 Ost 80663; 40 km (25 mi) east of Narva	103	8 April 1944	05:33	Il-2	PQ 25 Ost 78291; 30 km (19 mi) west of Pskov
94	19 March 1944	09:36	Yak-9	PQ 25 Ost 88133; 15 km (9.3 mi) north-northeast of Pskov	104	28 April 1944	17:52	Yak-9	PQ 25 Ost 87694 vicinity of Idritsa
95	27 March 1944	06:20	Il-2	PQ 25 Ost 78532, east-northeast of Petseri	105	28 April 1944	17:54	Il-2	PQ 25 Ost 97572; 10 km (6.2 mi) east of Idritsa
96	27 March 1944	06:22	Il-2	PQ 25 Ost 78254, east-northeast of Petseri	106	1 May 1944	11:10	Yak-9	PQ 25 Ost 96513; 15 km (9.3 mi) east of Polotsk
97	27 March 1944	06:24	Il-2	PQ 25 Ost 7826, east-northeast of Petseri	107	1 May 1944	11:13	Il-2	PQ 25 Ost 96381; 15 km (9.3 mi) southeast of Dretun
98	27 March 1944	06:26	Yak-9	PQ 25 Ost 78264, Kriwska, east-northeast of Petseri	108	1 May 1944	11:14	Il-2	PQ 25 Ost 96381; 15 km (9.3 mi) southeast of Dretun
99	31 March 1944	12:43	Il-2	PQ 25 Ost 88334; 15 km (9.3 mi) south of Pskov					
– 6. Staffel with IV. Gruppe of Jagdgeschwader 54 – Eastern Front — June – 20 August 1944
	9 July 1944	09:39	P-40	PQ 25 Ost 41165		21 July 1944	04:15	Yak-9	
	15 July 1944	13:48	Yak-9	PQ 26 Ost 50155 over sea in the middle of the Gulf of Finland	118	12 August 1944	10:15	Yak-9	Warka
The authors Prien, Stemmer, Balke and Bock state that Sterr claimed 13 undocumented aerial victories in the timeframe June to September 1944 while serving with 6. and 16. Staffel. These claims are also not listed by Mathews and Foreman.
– 16. Staffel of Jagdgeschwader 54 – Western Front — September 1944
126	23 September 1944	18:45	P-47	PQ 05 Ost 62256 vicinity of Nijmegen	127	25 September 1944	18:05	B-25	PQ 05 Ost 52238

=== Awards ===
- Iron Cross (1939)
  - 2nd Class (30 June 1942)
  - 1st Class (8 January 1943)
- Front Flying Clasp of the Luftwaffe for Fighter Pilots
  - in Bronze (10 April 1942)
  - Silver (22 July 1942)
  - Gold (14 September 1942)
- Honor Goblet of the Luftwaffe on 30 April 1943 as Feldwebel and pilot (Note: According to MacLean on 22 April 1943.)
- German Cross in Gold on 23 July 1943 as Oberfeldwebel in the 6./Jagdgeschwader 54
- Knight's Cross of the Iron Cross on 5 December 1943 as Oberfeldwebel and pilot in the 6./Jagdgeschwader 54

== Notes ==
Military offices
Preceded by Leutnant Karl Resch	Squadron Leader of 16./JG 54; November, 1944 – 26 November, 1944	Succeeded by Leutnant Paul Brandt
