= Ryjewo =

- Village
- Location within Poland
- Coordinates: 53°50′39″N 18°57′38″E
- Country: Poland
- Voivodeship: Pomeranian
- County: Kwidzyn
- Gmina: Ryjewo
- Population: 2,750

Ryjewo [rɨˈjɛvɔ] (German: Rehhof) is a village in Kwidzyn County, Pomeranian Voivodeship, in northern Poland. It is the seat of the gmina (administrative district) called Gmina Ryjewo.

== Notable residents ==
- Paul Brandt (1915–1944), German Luftwaffe ace
