= Albin Wolf =

German World War II fighter pilot (1920–1944)

- World War II photo of Albin Wolf
- Born: 28 October 1920; Naila
- Died: 2 April 1944 (aged 23) south of Pskov
- Cause of death: Killed in action
- Military career
- Allegiance: Nazi Germany
- Branch: Luftwaffe
- Service years: 1940–1944
- Rank: Oberleutnant (posthumous)
- Units: JG 1, JG 54
- Commands: 6./JG 54
- Conflicts: World War II
- Awards: Knight's Cross of the Iron Cross with Oak Leaves (posthumous)

Albin Wolf (28 October 1920 – 2 April 1944) was a German Luftwaffe military aviator during World War II, a fighter ace credited with 144 enemy aircraft shot down. All of his victories were claimed over the Eastern Front.

Born in Neuhaus, Wolf grew up in the Weimar Republic and Nazi Germany. Following graduation from school, he joined the Luftwaffe in 1940. In May 1942, Wolf was posted to Jagdgeschwader 54 (JG 54—54th Fighter Wing) and claimed his first aerial victory on 6 August 1942. Following his 117th aerial victory, he was awarded the Knight's Cross of the Iron Cross on 22 November 1943. Promoted to an officer's rank, he was appointed squadron leader of 6. Staffel (6th squadron) of JG 54 and claimed his 144th and last aerial victory on 2 April 1944. That day, he was shot down. He was posthumously bestowed with the Knight's Cross of the Iron Cross with Oak Leaves.

== Early life and career ==
Wolf was born on 28 October 1920 in Neuhaus, present-day part of Selbitz in the district Hof, at the time in the district of Naila, Bavaria. He was the son of a wage labourer. After graduation from school, Wolf joined the Luftwaffe in 1940. Following flight training, (Note: Flight training in the Luftwaffe progressed through the levels A1, A2 and B1, B2, referred to as A/B flight training. A training included theoretical and practical training in aerobatics, navigation, long-distance flights and dead-stick landings. The B courses included high-altitude flights, instrument flights, night landings and training to handle the aircraft in difficult situations.) he was posted to the 2. Staffel (2nd squadron) of Jagdgeschwader 1 (JG 1—1st Fighter Wing) based in Jever in the fall of 1941. (Note: For an explanation of Luftwaffe unit designations see Organization of the Luftwaffe during World War II.) Holding the rank of Unteroffizier (non-commissioned officer), he flew with this unit in Defense of the Reich until May 1942.

== World War II ==
World War II in Europe had begun on Friday 1 September 1939 when German forces invaded Poland. On 22 June 1941, Germany had launched Operation Barbarossa, the invasion of the Soviet Union, which initiated the Eastern Front. In May 1942, Wolf was transferred to the 6. Staffel (6th squadron) of Jagdgeschwader 54 (JG 54—54th Fighter Wing), operating on the northern sector of the Eastern Front. At the time, he was made a wingman of Hans Beißwenger. II. Gruppe (2nd group) of JG 54, to which 6. Staffel was subordinated, was one of the Luftwaffe units fighting in support of Army Group Centre, engaging in the Kholm Pocket and Demyansk Pocket.

Wolf claimed his first aerial victory over an Ilyushin Il-2 ground-attack aircraft, shot down on 6 August 1942 in the vicinity of Zubtsov during the Battles of Rzhev. Following his fourth claim, filed on 30 September, he was awarded Iron Cross 2nd Class (Eisernes Kreuz zweiter Klasse) the next day. On 23 March 1943, his number of aerial victories had increased to 18 following combat in the vicinity of Leningrad. This resulted in the presentation of the Honor Goblet of the Luftwaffe (Ehrenpokal der Luftwaffe) on 30 April 1943. On 12 July, during the Battle of Kursk, Soviet forces launched its counteroffensive named Operation Kutuzov. The next day, General Paul Deichmann dispatched the equivalent of eight Jagdgruppen to defend against the Soviet 15th Air Army. That morning, Wolf claimed a Soviet fighter aircraft shot down. He achieved his aerial victories 37–40 on 2 August 1943. By 4 September 1943, he had accumulated 78 victories. In November 1943, Wolf was credited with his 100th aerial victory. He was the 59th Luftwaffe pilot to achieve the century mark. Wolf received the Knight's Cross of the Iron Cross (Ritterkreuz des Eisernen Kreuzes) for 117 victories on 22 November 1943. He received the award together with fellow JG 51 pilot Leutnant Emil Lang.

On 24 December 1943, following the German retreat during the Battle of the Dnieper (26 August – 23 December 1943), Soviet forces initiated the Zhitomir–Berdichev Offensive as part of the Dnieper–Carpathian Offensive. The Soviet advance threatened the German airfield at Bila Tserkva and II. Gruppe of JG 54 was ordered to relocate to Tarnopol on 27 December. The transfer was attempted under adverse weather conditions. On 29 December, 24 aircraft took off but only one made it directly to Tarnopol. Many aircraft were lost that day, among them Focke-Wulf Fw 190 A-6 (Werknummer 531087—factory number) flown by Wolf who crash landed the aircraft and was severely wounded. On 18 January 1944, he was appointed Staffelkapitän (squadron leader) of 6. Staffel, succeeding Oberleutnant Horst Ademeit who was transferred.

Wolf's 135th aerial victory claimed on 23 March 1944 was also JG 54's 7000th of the war. Wolf was killed in action 20 kilometers (12 miles) south-east of Pskov on 2 April 1944 at 09:30. During aerial combat at low altitude with a Yakovlev Yak-9 fighter, his Fw 190 A-6 (Werknummer 551142—factory number) took a direct hit from an anti-aircraft shell. He was posthumously promoted to Oberleutnant (first lieutenant) and awarded the Knight's Cross of the Iron Cross with Oak Leaves (Ritterkreuz des Eisernen Kreuzes mit Eichenlaub) on 27 April 1944. He was the 464th member of the German armed forces to be so honored. Stockert indicated that the Oak Leaves presentation date 27 April 1944 may be incorrect. Based on a list published by the Oberkommando der Luftwaffe (High Command of the Air Force), the Oak Leaves were awarded on 25 April 1944. Wolf was succeeded by Leutnant Heinrich Sterr as commander of 6. Staffel.

== Summary of career ==
=== Aerial victory claims ===
According to US historian David T. Zabecki, Wolf was credited with 144 aerial victories. Scutts and Spick also list him with the same number of aerial victories. Mathews and Foreman, authors of Luftwaffe Aces — Biographies and Victory Claims, researched the German Federal Archives and found records for 142 aerial victory claims, all of which claimed on the Eastern Front.

Victory claims were logged to a map-reference (PQ = Planquadrat), for example "PQ 18234". The Luftwaffe grid map (Jägermeldenetz) covered all of Europe, western Russia and North Africa and was composed of rectangles measuring 15 minutes of latitude by 30 minutes of longitude, an area of about 360 square miles (930 km^{2}). These sectors were then subdivided into 36 smaller units to give a location area 3 km × 4 km (1.9 mi × 2.5 mi) in size.

Chronicle of aerial victories
This and the ♠ (Ace of spades) indicates those aerial victories which made Wolf an "ace-in-a-day", a term which designates a fighter pilot who has shot down five or more airplanes in a single day. This and the ? (question mark) indicates information discrepancies listed by Prien, Stemmer, Rodeike, Bock, Mathews and Foreman.
Claim	Date	Time	Type	Location	Claim	Date	Time	Type	Location
– 6. Staffel of Jagdgeschwader 54 – Eastern Front — 1 May 1942 – 3 February 1943
1	6 August 1942	15:50	Il-2	northwest of Kamischtchewo	6	29 December 1942	12:55	P-39	PQ 18234; 30 km (19 mi) east-southeast of Staraya Russa
2	23 August 1942	12:07	Yak-1	PQ 54244; 25 km (16 mi) south-southeast of Sukhinichi	7	30 December 1942	11:54	LaGG-3	PQ 28144; 40 km (25 mi) northwest of Demyansk
3	5 September 1942	11:10	Pe-2	PQ 28464; 25 km (16 mi) east of Demyansk	8	30 December 1942	13:44	Il-2	PQ 28145; 30 km (19 mi) northwest of Demyansk
4	30 September 1942	08:46	Il-2	PQ 29751; 45 km (28 mi) north-northwest of Demyansk	9	14 January 1943	12:35	Il-2	PQ 10162 southeast of Shlisselburg
5	4 December 1942	10:15	Il-2	PQ 09854	10	26 January 1943	11:25	Il-2	PQ 10113 vicinity of Shlisselburg
– 6. Staffel of Jagdgeschwader 54 – Eastern Front — 4 February – 31 December 1943
11	11 February 1943	10:30	La-5	PQ 36 Ost 20514; 45 km (28 mi) east-northeast of Lyuban	67	28 August 1943	06:14	La-5	PQ 35 Ost 43873; 15 km (9.3 mi) south-southeast of Sevsk
12	23 February 1943	15:53	LaGG-3	PQ 35 Ost 19761; 15 km (9.3 mi) north-northeast of Staraya Russa	68	28 August 1943	11:52	Yak-4? (Note: According to Mathews and Foreman claimed as a Yakovlev Yak-9.)	PQ 35 Ost 43822; 15 km (9.3 mi) east-northeast of Sevsk
13	27 February 1943	15:40	LaGG-3	PQ 35 Ost 18453; 40 km (25 mi) west of Demyansk	69	30 August 1943	14:23	La-5	PQ 35 Ost 35641; 25 km (16 mi) west of Spas-Demensk
14	5 March 1943	07:30	Il-2	PQ 35 Ost 18423; 40 km (25 mi) southeast of Staraya Russa	70	30 August 1943	17:53	Yak-9	PQ 35 Ost 45523; 15 km (9.3 mi) northeast of Spas-Demensk
15	5 March 1943	13:55	Il-2	PQ 35 Ost 18212; 20 km (12 mi) east-southeast of Staraya Russa	71	30 August 1943	18:01	La-5	PQ 35 Ost 35491; 20 km (12 mi) north-northwest of Spas-Demensk
16	5 March 1943	16:18	La-5	PQ 35 Ost 18391; 45 km (28 mi) northeast of Kholm	72	31 August 1943	06:48	Yak-9	PQ 35 Ost 35632; 10 km (6.2 mi) northwest of Spas-Demensk
17	7 March 1943	09:15	La-5	PQ 35 Ost 18391; 45 km (28 mi) northeast of Kholm	73	31 August 1943	15:31	Pe-2	PQ 35 Ost 35554; 20 km (12 mi) south of Yelnya
18	23 March 1943	17:20	P-40	PQ 36 Ost 00243; 20 km (12 mi) southeast of Leningrad	74	31 August 1943	15:34	Pe-2	PQ 35 Ost 35643; 25 km (16 mi) west of Spas-Demensk
19	18 June 1943	12:20	LaGG-3	PQ 36 Ost 20113 west of Volkhov	75	1 September 1943	18:08	Il-2	PQ 35 Ost 25453; 25 km (16 mi) west-northwest of Yelnya
20	24 June 1943	07:10	LaGG-3	PQ 36 Ost 21871; 20 km (12 mi) northeast of Volkhov	76	1 September 1943	18:10	Il-2	PQ 35 Ost 25433; 20 km (12 mi) northwest of Yelnya
21	13 July 1943	06:57	Yak-7	PQ 35 Ost 63894; 25 km (16 mi) southeast of Mtsensk	77	4 September 1943	16:36	Yak-9	PQ 35 Ost 26632; 40 km (25 mi) south of Bogolyubovo
22	13 July 1943	11:54	Pe-2	PQ 35 Ost 63222; 40 km (25 mi) east of Oryol	78	4 September 1943	17:04	Yak-9	PQ 35 Ost 25484; 25 km (16 mi) west of Yelnya
23	13 July 1943	14:15	Il-2	PQ 35 Ost 63412; 35 km (22 mi) north of Maloarkhangelsk	79	5 September 1943	11:24	Yak-9	PQ 35 Ost 25493; 15 km (9.3 mi) west of Yelnya
24	14 July 1943	14:21	LaGG-3	PQ 35 Ost 54333; 45 km (28 mi) east-southeast of Zhizdra	80	5 September 1943	17:50? (Note: According to Mathews and Foreman claimed at 17:40.)	La-5	PQ 35 Ost 35374; 5 km (3.1 mi) southwest of Yelnya
25	15 July 1943	17:02	LaGG-3	PQ 35 Ost 64883; 25 km (16 mi) southeast of Mtsensk	81♠	7 September 1943	08:06	Yak-9	PQ 35 Ost 26824; 20 km (12 mi) north of Yartsevo
26	16 July 1943	18:57	La-5		82♠	7 September 1943	08:23	Yak-9	PQ 35 Ost 26823; 20 km (12 mi) north of Yartsevo
27	17 July 1943	06:43	La-5	PQ 35 Ost 54614; 25 km (16 mi) west of Bolkhov	83♠	7 September 1943	11:09	Yak-9	PQ 35 Ost 26673; 25 km (16 mi) northeast of Moschna
28	17 July 1943	06:58? (Note: According to Mathews and Foreman claimed at 06:55.)	La-5	PQ 35 Ost 54183; 10 km (6.2 mi) east of Belyov	84♠	7 September 1943	11:17	Yak-9	PQ 35 Ost 26861; 15 km (9.3 mi) east-northeast of Yartsevo
29	19 July 1943	11:47	Yak-7	PQ 35 Ost 54442; 30 km (19 mi) northwest of Bolkhov	85♠	7 September 1943	16:45	Yak-9	PQ 35 Ost 26491; 45 km (28 mi) southwest of Bogolyubovo
30	20 July 1943	08:29	LaGG-3	PQ 35 Ost 64871; 25 km (16 mi) south of Mtsensk	86	9 September 1943	17:04	Yak-9? (Note: According to Mathews and Foreman claimed as a Yakovlev Yak-4.)	PQ 35 Ost 26242; 10 km (6.2 mi) northwest of Yartsevo
31	22 July 1943	15:18	Yak-7	PQ 35 Ost 64799; 25 km (16 mi) east-northeast of Oryol	87	10 September 1943	09:57	Yak-9	PQ 35 Ost 26841; 10 km (6.2 mi) northwest of Yartsevo
32	23 July 1943	18:27	La-5	PQ 35 Ost 63161; 20 km (12 mi) south-eastsouth of Oryol	88	11 September 1943	16:01? (Note: According to Mathews and Foreman claimed at 15:05.)	Yak-9	PQ 35 Ost 35852
33	25 July 1943	12:40	La-5	PQ 35 Ost 53291; 20 km (12 mi) south-southwest of Oryol	89	15 September 1943	08:51	Yak-9	PQ 35 Ost 26812, northeast of Dukhovshchina; 20 km (12 mi) north-northwest of Yartsevo
34	30 July 1943	05:24	La-5	PQ 36 Ost 00224; 20 km (12 mi) west of Shlisselburg	90? (Note: The authors Prien, Stemmer, Rodeike and Bock do not list this claim. However, they date a possible claim of unknown type in the timeframe 18 September to 3 October 1943 which might correlate to this claim listed by Mathews and Foreman.)	15 September 1943	10:29	Il-2	25 km (16 mi) northwest of Yelnya
35	30 July 1943	16:54	Il-2	PQ 36 Ost 10153 southeast of Shlisselburg	91	15 September 1943	11:01	La-5	PQ 35 Ost 35341; 20 km (12 mi) south of Smolensk
36	1 August 1943	06:13? (Note: According to Mathews and Foreman claimed at 06:43.)	La-5	PQ 36 Ost 00263; 10 km (6.2 mi) southwest of Shlisselburg	92	15 September 1943	13:14	Yak-9	PQ 35 Ost 35541; 20 km (12 mi) south-southwest of Yelnya
37	2 August 1943	08:52	Yak-7	PQ 36 Ost 10191 east of Mga	93	15 September 1943	17:25	La-5	PQ 35 Ost 35374; 5 km (3.1 mi) southwest of Yelnya
38	2 August 1943	08:57	Yak-7	PQ 36 Ost 10411; 25 km (16 mi) east-southeast of Mga	94	17 September 1943	11:23	Yak-9	PQ 35 Ost 35383; 15 km (9.3 mi) south of Yelnya
39	2 August 1943	09:10	Yak-7	PQ 36 Ost 10414; 25 km (16 mi) east-southeast of Mga	95	23 October 1943	13:19	La-5	PQ 35 Ost 10112 vicinity of Shlisselburg
40	2 August 1943	12:54	Il-2	PQ 36 Ost 10352; 20 km (12 mi) southeast of Mga	96	23 October 1943	15:17	Yak-9	PQ 35 Ost 10161 southeast of Shlisselburg
41	7 August 1943	13:55	Yak-9? (Note: According to Mathews and Foreman claimed as a Yakovlev Yak-4.)	PQ 35 Ost 54631; 10 km (6.2 mi) west of Bolkhov	97	23 October 1943	15:23	La-5	PQ 35 Ost 10114 vicinity of Shlisselburg
42	8 August 1943	19:00	La-5	PQ 35 Ost 54672; 30 km (19 mi) southwest of Bolkhov	98	24 October 1943	10:00	La-5	PQ 35 Ost 01454; Lake Ladoga
43	9 August 1943	18:31	La-5	PQ 35 Ost 54843; 40 km (25 mi) east of Karachev	99	25 October 1943	12:14	La-5	PQ 35 Ost 11371; Lake Ladoga
44	13 August 1943	16:20	La-5	PQ 35 Ost 54743; 5 km (3.1 mi) east of Karachev	100	25 October 1943	15:35	Yak-9	PQ 35 Ost 11794; Lake Ladoga
45	13 August 1943	16:30	Il-2	PQ 35 Ost 53213; 30 km (19 mi) west of Oryol	101	26 October 1943	10:40	La-5	PQ 35 Ost 10131 east of Shlisselburg
46	14 August 1943	05:01	Yak-9	PQ 35 Ost 45721; 15 km (9.3 mi) north-northwest of Kirov	102	26 October 1943	10:55	La-5	PQ 35 Ost 11733; Lake Ladoga
47	14 August 1943	05:08	Yak-9	PQ 35 Ost 45734; 15 km (9.3 mi) north-northeast of Kirov	103	28 October 1943	12:06	La-5	PQ 35 Ost 01394; 60 km (37 mi) northeast of Zelenogorsk
48	14 August 1943	05:14	Yak-9	PQ 35 Ost 45744, northwest of Kirov; 15 km (9.3 mi) west of Kirov	104	28 October 1943	12:09	Pe-2	PQ 35 Ost 01391; 60 km (37 mi) northeast of Zelenogorsk
49	14 August 1943	08:46	Yak-9	PQ 35 Ost 45763; 5 km (3.1 mi) northeast of Kirov	105	1 November 1943	09:27	Il-2	PQ 35 Ost 10121 east of Shlisselburg
50	16 August 1943	13:26	Il-2	PQ 35 Ost 45733 vicinity of Spas-Demensk	106	2 November 1943	13:25	La-5	PQ 35 Ost 10122 east of Shlisselburg
51	16 August 1943	13:35	Il-2	PQ 35 Ost 35861; 25 km (16 mi) west of Kirov	107	2 November 1943	15:06	Yak-9	PQ 35 Ost 01361; 65 km (40 mi) northeast of Zelenogorsk
52	17 August 1943	08:53	Yak-9	PQ 35 Ost 44842; 20 km (12 mi) southeast of Bryansk	108	3 November 1943	13:55	Yak-9	PQ 35 Ost 01394; 60 km (37 mi) northeast of Zelenogorsk
53	19 August 1943	05:47? (Note: According to Mathews and Foreman claimed at 05:44.)	Yak-9	PQ 35 Ost 43864; 25 km (16 mi) east-southeast of Sevsk	109	3 November 1943	14:29	Yak-9	PQ 35 Ost 01333; 70 km (43 mi) northeast of Zelenogorsk
54	19 August 1943	16:23	Yak-9	PQ 35 Ost 45751; 5 km (3.1 mi) northwest of Kirov	110♠	6 November 1943	07:17	La-5	PQ 35 Ost 01592; 45 km (28 mi) east-northeast of Zelenogorsk
55	20 August 1943	06:29	P-39	PQ 35 Ost 43851; 15 km (9.3 mi) southeast of Sevsk	111♠	6 November 1943	07:21	La-5	PQ 35 Ost 01594; 45 km (28 mi) east-northeast of Zelenogorsk
56	21 August 1943	13:20? (Note: According to Mathews and Foreman claimed at 12:30.)	Yak-9	PQ 35 Ost 35624; 20 km (12 mi) west-northwest of Spas-Demensk	112♠	6 November 1943	07:25	La-5	PQ 35 Ost 01672; 40 km (25 mi) north-northeast of Leningrad
57	21 August 1943	16:20	La-5	PQ 35 Ost 43861; 25 km (16 mi) east-southeast of Sevsk	113♠	6 November 1943	15:19	Yak-9	PQ 35 Ost 01564; 45 km (28 mi) northeast of Zelenogorsk
58	22 August 1943	06:23	P-39	PQ 35 Ost 43832; 25 km (16 mi) east-southeast of Sevsk	114♠	6 November 1943	15:24	Yak-9	PQ 35 Ost 01643; 55 km (34 mi) north-northeast of Leningrad
59	22 August 1943	06:26	La-5	PQ 35 Ost 43863; 25 km (16 mi) east-southeast of Sevsk	115	22 November 1943	14:16	Il-2	PQ 25 Ost 91564; 20 km (12 mi) north-northwest of Zelenogorsk
60	22 August 1943	13:07	Yak-9	PQ 35 Ost 43454; 25 km (16 mi) west-northwest of Dmitrowsk	116	29 November 1943	10:40	Yak-9	PQ 25 Ost 91651; 20 km (12 mi) north-northeast of Zelenogorsk
61	22 August 1943	16:22	La-5	PQ 35 Ost 43852; 15 km (9.3 mi) southeast of Sevsk	117	29 November 1943	10:43	Yak-9	PQ 25 Ost 91642; 20 km (12 mi) north of Zelenogorsk
62	23 August 1943	10:07	P-39	PQ 35 Ost 42224	118	10 December 1943	08:47	La-5	PQ 35 Ost 00133; 10 km (6.2 mi) east of Leningrad
63	24 August 1943	06:58	DB-3	PQ 35 Ost 44553; 20 km (12 mi) north-northwest of Bryansk	119	11 December 1943	08:11	Il-2	PQ 35 Ost 00121 vicinity of Leningrad
64	24 August 1943	07:00	DB-3	PQ 35 Ost 44374; 20 km (12 mi) west-southwest of Dyatkovo	120	12 December 1943	13:35	La-5	PQ 35 Ost 00112; 10 km (6.2 mi) west of Leningrad
65	24 August 1943	07:03	DB-3	PQ 35 Ost 44383; 10 km (6.2 mi) southwest of Dyatkovo	121	14 December 1943	09:37	La-5	PQ 35 Ost 01772; 15 km (9.3 mi) northwest of Leningrad
66	24 August 1943	15:09	Il-2	PQ 35 Ost 44483; 25 km (16 mi) south of Zhizdra	122	17 December 1943	08:02	La-5	PQ 35 Ost 01722; 15 km (9.3 mi) northwest of Leningrad
– 6. Staffel of Jagdgeschwader 54 – Eastern Front — 1 January 1944 – 2 April 1944
123	15 January 1944	12:17	La-5	PQ 26 Ost 80862; 50 km (31 mi) southeast of Narva	133	19 March 1944	11:19	Yak-9? (Note: According to Mathews and Foreman claimed as a Yakovlev Yak-1.)	PQ 25 Ost 99711; 50 km (31 mi) northwest of Porchov
124	15 January 1944	12:19	Il-2	PQ 26 Ost 90713; 40 km (25 mi) southwest of Lissino	134	22 March 1944	11:34	La-5? (Note: According to Mathews and Foreman claimed as a Lavochkin La-7.)	PQ 25 Ost 97564; 30 km (19 mi) east-northeast of Idriza
125	15 January 1944	12:31	La-5	PQ 26 Ost 90574; 35 km (22 mi) southwest of Lissino	135	23 March 1944	16:47? (Note: According to Mathews and Foreman claimed at 15:47.)	Yak-9	PQ 25 Ost 97641; 30 km (19 mi) east-northeast of Idriza
126	22 January 1944	14:46	La-5	PQ 26 Ost 80663; 40 km (25 mi) east of Narva	136	26 March 1944	09:40	Yak-9	PQ 25 Ost 88862; 45 km (28 mi) southeast of Ostrov
127	24 January 1944	10:34	Yak-9	PQ 26 Ost 80683; 35 km (22 mi) northeast of Narva	137	26 March 1944	12:57	Yak-9	PQ 25 Ost 78284; 40 km (25 mi) west of Pskov
128	28 January 1944	14:43	La-5	PQ 26 Ost 90572; 35 km (22 mi) southwest of Lissino	138	27 March 1944	06:20	Yak-9	PQ 25 Ost 78254, east-northeast of Petseri
129	28 January 1944	15:09	La-5	PQ 26 Ost 80632; 35 km (22 mi) northeast of Narva	139	27 March 1944	06:25	Il-2	PQ 25 Ost 78261
130	11 February 1944	13:24	La-5	PQ 36 Ost 00683; 25 km (16 mi) south-southwest of Tosno	140	27 March 1944	06:37	Yak-9	PQ 25 Ost 89772; 25 km (16 mi) northwest of Pskov
131	19 March 1944	10:32	Yak-9	PQ 25 Ost 89451; 35 km (22 mi) northeast of Pskov	141	31 March 1944	14:47	Yak-9	PQ 25 Ost 89341; 15 km (9.3 mi) southeast of Gdov
132	19 March 1944	11:04	Yak-9	PQ 25 Ost 88112; Lake Peipus, 20 km (12 mi) northwest of Pskov	142	2 April 1944	09:27	Yak-9	PQ 25 Ost 88442; 25 km (16 mi) southeast of Pskov

=== Awards ===
- Iron Cross (1939)
  - 2nd Class (1 October 1942)
  - 1st Class (22 January 1943)
- Honor Goblet of the Luftwaffe on 30 April 1943 as Unteroffizier and pilot
- German Cross in Gold on 17 October 1943 as Oberfeldwebel in the 6./Jagdgeschwader 54
- Knight's Cross of the Iron Cross with Oak Leaves
  - Knight's Cross on 22 November 1943 as Oberfeldwebel and pilot in the 6./Jagdgeschwader 54 (Note: According to Scherzer as pilot in the II./Jagdgeschwader 54.)
  - 464th Oak Leaves on 27 April 1944 (posthumously) as Leutnant and pilot in the 6./Jagdgeschwader 54 (Note: According to Scherzer on 25 April 1944.)
