= Klinggräff =

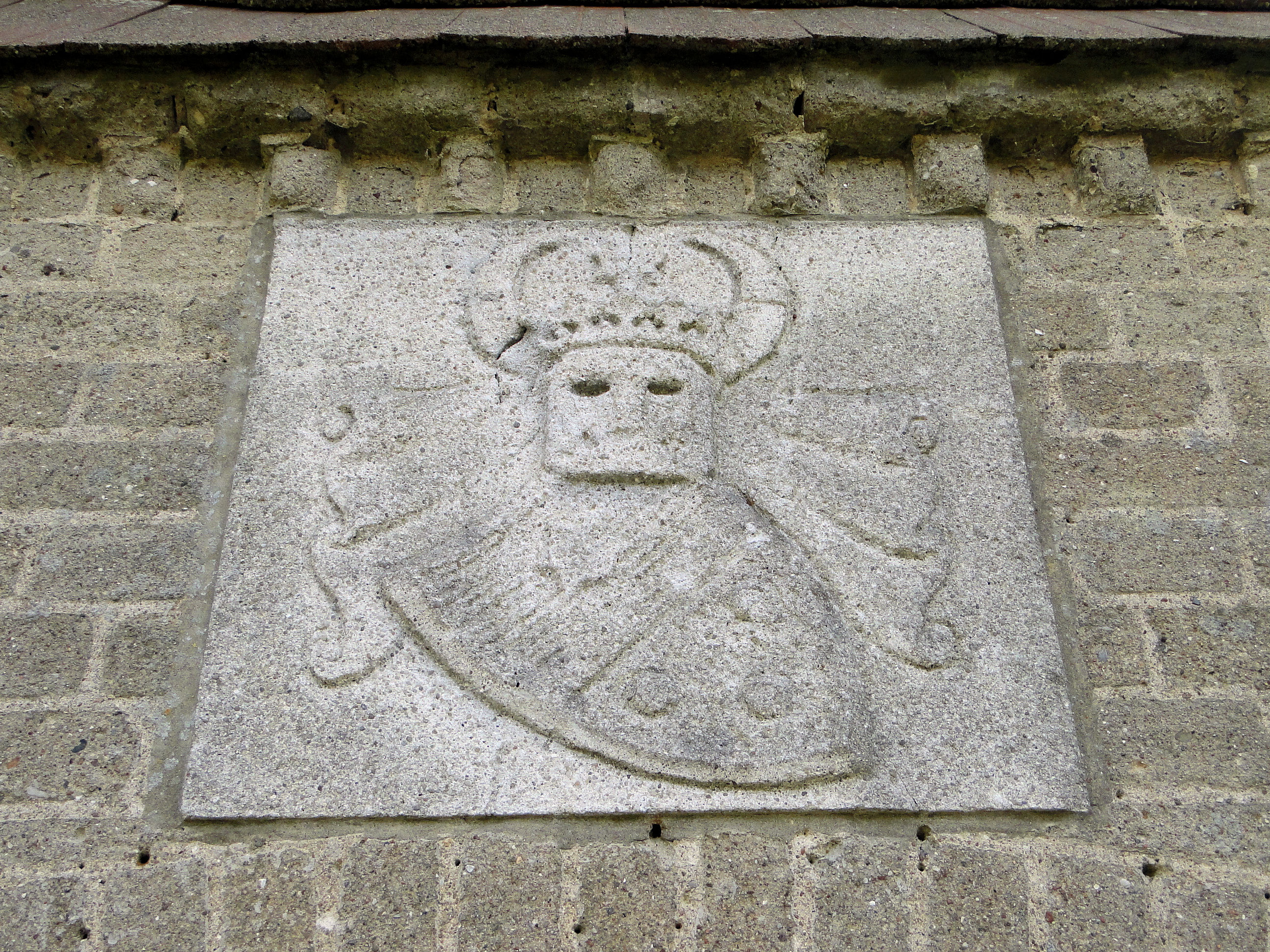
Coat of Arms of the Klinggräff family

The Klinggräff family was a German noble family, hailing from Kindelbrück in Thuringia, Germany. The family was ennobled on 20 September 1715 by Charles VI, Holy Roman Emperor. After that, the family was received the nobility of Prussia. Members of the family distinguished themselves as diplomats and botanists.

== Notable members ==
- Carl Julius Meyer von Klinggräff (1809–1879, C.Klinggr.), German botanist
- Hugo Erich Meyer von Klinggräff (1820–1902, H.Klinggr.), German botanist
