= Dimitar Ilievski-Murato =

Macedonian mountain climber

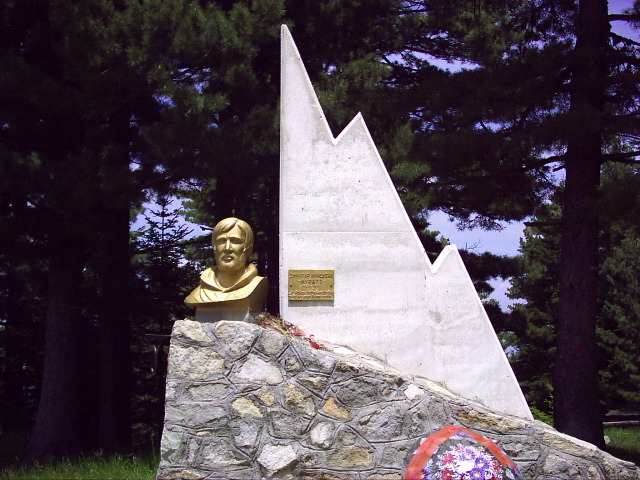
Memorial of Dimitar Ilievski-Murato on Pelister near the "Kopanki" mountain refuge

Dimitar Ilievski-Murato (September 29, 1953, Bitola, Macedonia – May 10, 1989, Mount Everest, Nepal) was a Macedonian alpinist, known as the first Macedonian to summit the world's highest mountain, Mount Everest. He reached the summit on 10 May 1989, but failed to return to base camp and was officially listed as missing.

After reaching the summit, he put the flags of both former SFR Yugoslavia and SR Macedonia.

In his honour, a traditional memorial march to Pelister named after him is organized every year around the date of his biggest achievement and tragedy.

He is regarded as one of the greatest alpinists in the history of Macedonian alpinism, mountaineering and sports in general. He was distinguished by his extraordinary passion for the mountains and unwavering ambition to take on the most difficult challenges. Throughout his distinguished alpine and mountaineering career, he climbed numerous mountain peaks.

A memorial monument was erected in his honour on Pelister. He was posthumously awarded the Medal for Merit for Macedonia.

He was part of the First Macedonian Alpine Expedition Andes '82, the Macedonian Alpine Expedition Pamir '84, the First Macedonian Alpine Himalayan Expedition Manaslu '86 and the Second Macedonian Alpine Himalayan Expedition Everest '89.

Dimitar Ilievski reached the summit of Mount Everest on 10 May 1989 as part of a larger Macedonian Alpine Himalayan Expedition Everest '89, of which only few alpinists succeeded to reach the summit. Macedonian alpinist Borče Jovčevski remained at Camp IV to provide logistical support for the summit team. The expedition leader was Jovan Poposki. Dimitar Ilievski is noted as the 264th summiter of Mount Everest.

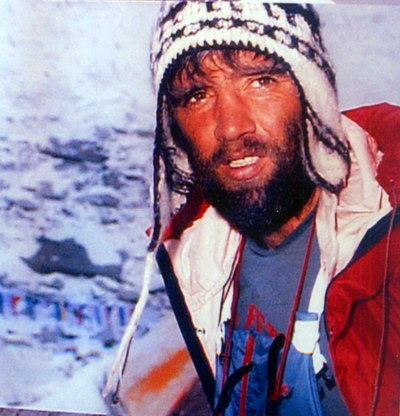
Dimitar Ilievski

== Ascent of Mount Everest ==
On 10 May 1989, Dimitar Ilievski-Murato, as a member of the Macedonian Alpine Himalayan Expedition "Everest '89", reached the summit of the world's highest mountain, Mount Everest, in the Himalayas, raising the Macedonian flag for the first time. The ascent was made from the Nepalese side via the Khumbu Icefall, following a route that subsequently became the standard route adopted by expeditions ascending the mountain from this side.

The base camp was established on the moraines below the icefall, at an elevation of 5,370–5,500 metres above sea level. The route to the summit passed through the Khumbu Icefall, the Western Cwm, the slope below Lhotse, and the South Col. Four high-altitude camps were established along the route. Camp I was located at approximately 6,100 metres, Camp II below Lhotse at 6,200 metres above sea level, Camp III on Lhotse itself at 7,300 metres, and the final camp on the South Col at approximately 8,000 metres.

On the same day, Ilievski was joined at the summit by Slovenian alpinist Viktor Grošelj, Croatian alpinist Stipe Božić, and Sherpas Sonam and Adživa. Macedonian alpinist Borče Jovčevski was stationed at Camp IV. He had been part of the summit team alongside Ilievski but, due to frostbite caused by ill-fitting boots, was forced to remain in his tent at an altitude of 8,000 metres.

The ascent to the summit took approximately 15 hours in deep-snow conditions. Dimitar and Stipe spent about an hour at the summit. During the descent, Ilievski is believed to have remained at an altitude of approximately 8,200 metres. The cause of his death remains unclear to this day, as he had been in excellent physical condition throughout both the ascent and descent, frequently breaking trail through the snow ahead of the Sherpas. It is presumed that, after briefly stopping at 8,200 metres to wait for Stipe, who was following behind and experiencing problems with his headlamp, Dimitar fell asleep.

Dimitar Ilievski was the first Macedonian to summit Mount Everest and, for a long time, remained the only Macedonian to have climbed a mountain higher than 8,000 metres. In the autumn of 2005, a memorial was erected below Everest Base Camp in his honour, through the efforts of the expedition committee and the Macedonian Union of Mountain Sports.

The leader of the Macedonian Mount Everest expedition was the alpinist Jovan Poposki.

== Other alpine climbing achievements ==
In addition to his ascent of Mount Everest in 1989, Dime climbed numerous peaks in Macedonia, the Balkans, and the Alps. Among other achievements, he climbed Mont Blanc on 25 July 1979 and 20 August 1981, as well as several other peaks in the Mont Blanc massif via alpine climbing routes. He also climbed the Matterhorn on 14 August 1981, together with Đorđi Kostovski, Blagojče Lazarov, and Mirko Kostovski; Dufourspitze on Monte Rosa on 17 August 1981; Grossglockner; Marmolada; and numerous other peaks in the Dolomites.

As part of the Macedonian Alpine Expedition "Andes '82", thirteen of the fifteen expedition members climbed the eastern ridge of Huascarán (6,768 m) in South America. In addition, Dimitar Ilievski, together with Blagojče Lazarov, Slobodan Jovanovski, and Đorđi Kostovski, climbed the northern peak. In 1982, he climbed both the northern and southern summits of Huascarán, as well as Chopicalqui.

In 1984, as a member of the Macedonian Alpine Expedition "Pamir '84", he climbed Ismoil Somoni Peak in the Pamir Mountains.

In 1986, as a member of the Macedonian Alpine Himalayan Expedition "Manaslu '86", he reached an altitude of 7,500 metres together with the alpinists Slobodan Jovanoski and Borče Jovčevski, during the first repeat ascent of the Polish Route on the dangerous eastern face of Manaslu (8,167 m), after reaching the South Col, as part of the First Macedonian Alpine Himalayan Expedition "Manaslu '86".

At the summit of the Matterhorn, 14 August 1981. From left to right: Mirko Kostovski and Dimitar Ilievski.

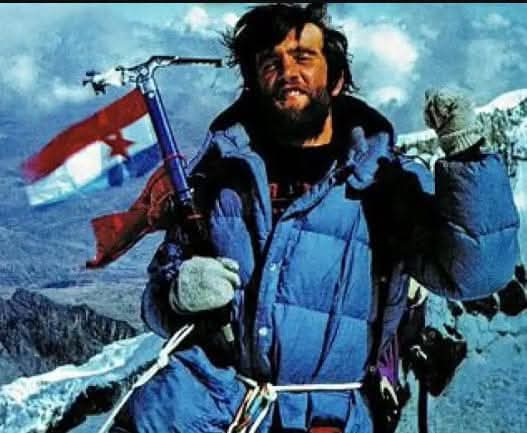
Dimitar Ilievski

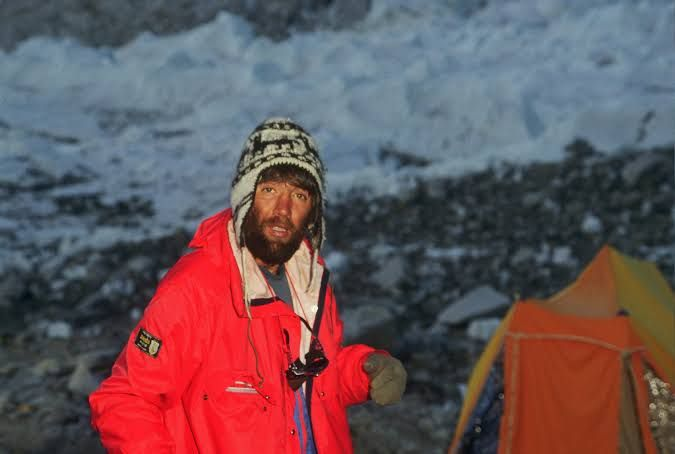
Dimitar Ilievski

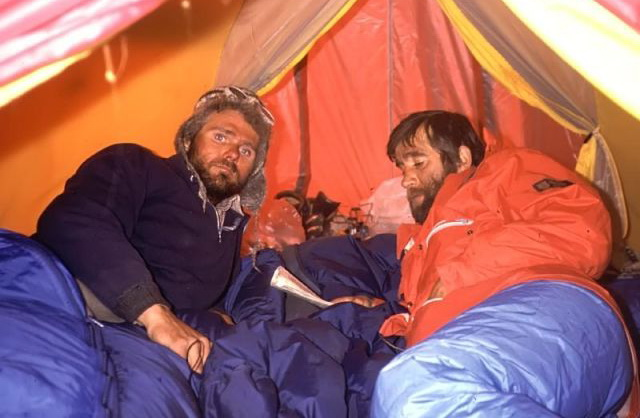
Borče Jovčevski and Dimitar Ilievski in a tent.

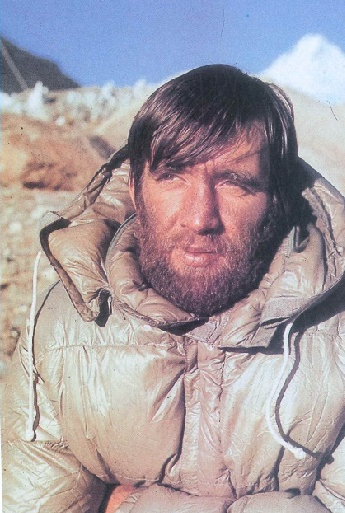
Dimitar Ilievski

In addition to his numerous challenging climbs in the Alps, he established many new climbing routes at Matka, Solunska Glava, Demir Kapija, the rock formations around Prilep, on Pelister, in the Prokletije mountains, on Vihren, and in many other mountain ranges.

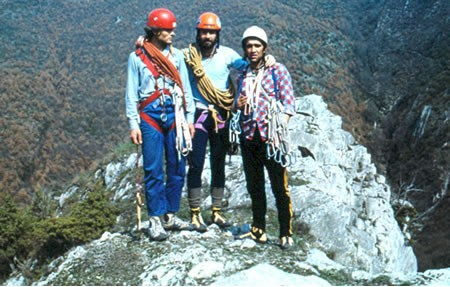
Borče Jovčevski, Slobodan Jovanovski, and Dimitar Ilievski at Matka.

Jovan Poposki (left) and Dimitar Ilievski (right) at the top of the cliffs in the Demir Kapija Gorge, following climbing ascents undertaken as training for Macedonian Himalayan expeditions in the 1980s.

Participants in the First Macedonian Alpine Expedition "Andes '82": standing, from left to right: Jovan Poposki, Blagojče Lazarov, Đorđi Kostovski, Zlatko Panovski, Vasil Frangovski, Ivan Žežovski, Panče Đorđievski, and Slobodan Stojkov; seated: Cvetan Pavlovski, Ljubomir Pop Stefanija, Borče Jovčevski, Dimitar Ilievski, and Slobodan Jovanovski.

Participants in the Macedonian Alpine Expedition "Pamir '84", from left to right: Dimitar Ilievski, Đorđi Kostovski, Blagojče Lazarov, Borče Jovčevski, Jovan Poposki, and Slobodan Jovanovski.

Some participants in the First Macedonian Alpine Himalayan Expedition "Manaslu '86": top row, from left to right: Jovan Poposki, Blagojče Lazarov, Strašo Lozanovski, Trajče Aleksov, Gradimir Zdravković, and Slobodan Jovanovski; bottom row, from left to right: Serafim Serafimovski, Dimitar Ilievski, Đorđi Kostovski, Borče Jovčevski, and Živko Arsovski. Slobodan Đorđevikj and Slobodan Trpevski are absent from the photograph. Vladimir Boškov replaced Gradimir Zdravković on the expedition.

== Efforts to recover his body ==
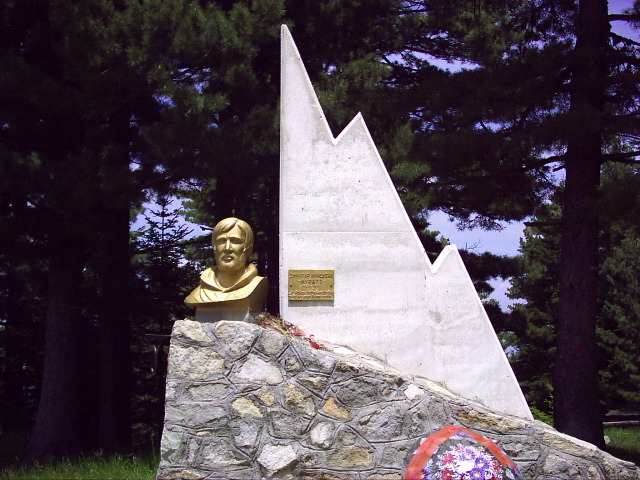
Memorial to Dimitar Ilievski on Pelister

In 1998, an alpine expedition was organised by the Union of Mountain sports in Macedonia and the Macedonian Olympic Committee with the aim of recovering Dime's body from the mountain. In accordance with Nepalese law, the body was to be cremated in a formal ceremony below Base Camp, and the urn containing his ashes brought to Macedonia and placed in a museum room dedicated to this prominent Macedonian alpinist.

The Macedonian expedition was intended to form part of the International Mount Everest Cleanup Expedition, whose objectives included cleaning up the mountain and recovering the bodies of deceased mountaineers. However, the expedition did not take place due to administrative obstacles involving the Nepalese government that arose shortly before its scheduled departure. Nevertheless, the idea of recovering Dime's body has not been abandoned, as its exact location is believed to be known.

== Awards and honours ==
For his achievements, Dime Ilievski received numerous awards and distinctions, including the "11 October Award" and the Sportsman of the Year award for 1989. The Macedonian Olympic Committee declared him a "Giant of Sport".

- "4 November", the anniversary of the liberation of Bitola, 1979
- Gold badges of the Mountaineering Union of Macedonia for 1980, 1982, and 1984
- Order of Merit for the People with Silver Star, 1984
- Bitola Sportsman of the Year, 1984 and 1989
- "25 May", 1989
- Macedonian Sportsman of the Year, 1989
- Recognition for participation in the Mount Everest expedition of 1989, awarded by the Assembly of the City of Skopje
- Macedonian Sporting Great, 1989, awarded by the Macedonian Olympic Committee
- Order of Merit for the People with Gold Star, 1989
- "11 October Award", 1990
- "Achievement of the Century" recognition, Municipality of Bitola, 1999
- Sportsman of the Year 1999 and Sportsman of the 20th Century, awarded by the newspaper Skok
- Golden Plaque "Sportsman of the Century", 1999, awarded by the Sports Association of Bitola

In February 2008, together with Gligor Delev, the second Macedonian to summit Mount Everest, Dimitar Ilievski was posthumously awarded the Medal for Merit for Macedonia by then-President Branko Crvenkovski.
