= Borowy Młyn, Kwidzyn County =

Borowy Młyn
- Village
- Location within Poland
- Coordinates: 53°51′57″N 18°57′5″E
- Country: Poland
- Voivodeship: Pomeranian
- County: Kwidzyn
- Gmina: Ryjewo
- Population: 126

Borowy Młyn ([bɔˈrɔvɨ ˈmwɨn]) (German: Heidemühl) is a village in the administrative district of Gmina Ryjewo, within Kwidzyn County, Pomeranian Voivodeship, in northern Poland.

For the history of the region, see History of Pomerania.
