= Kuliki, Kwidzyn County =

Kuliki
- Settlement
- Location within Poland
- Coordinates: 53°54′12″N 18°58′08″E
- Country: Poland
- Voivodeship: Pomeranian
- County: Kwidzyn
- Gmina: Ryjewo
- Population: 5

Kuliki [kuˈliki] is a settlement in the administrative district of Gmina Ryjewo, within Kwidzyn County, Pomeranian Voivodeship, in northern Poland.

For the history of the region, see History of Pomerania.
