= Kuliki, Oryol Oblast =

Rural locality in Orlovsky District, Oryol Oblast, Russia

Coordinates: 52°52′57″N 36°02′40″E

Kuliki (Russian: Кулики) is a village in Orlovsky District of Oryol Oblast, Russia.
