= Szkaradowo Szlacheckie =

- Settlement
- Location within Poland
- Coordinates: 53°51′22″N 18°53′05″E
- Country: Poland
- Voivodeship: Pomeranian
- County: Kwidzyn
- Gmina: Ryjewo
- Population: 34

Szkaradowo Szlacheckie [ʂkaraˈdɔvɔ ʂlaˈxɛt͡skʲɛ] is a settlement in the administrative district of Gmina Ryjewo, within Kwidzyn County, Pomeranian Voivodeship, in northern Poland.

For the history of the region, see History of Pomerania.
