= Matka, Raebareli =

Matka
- Village
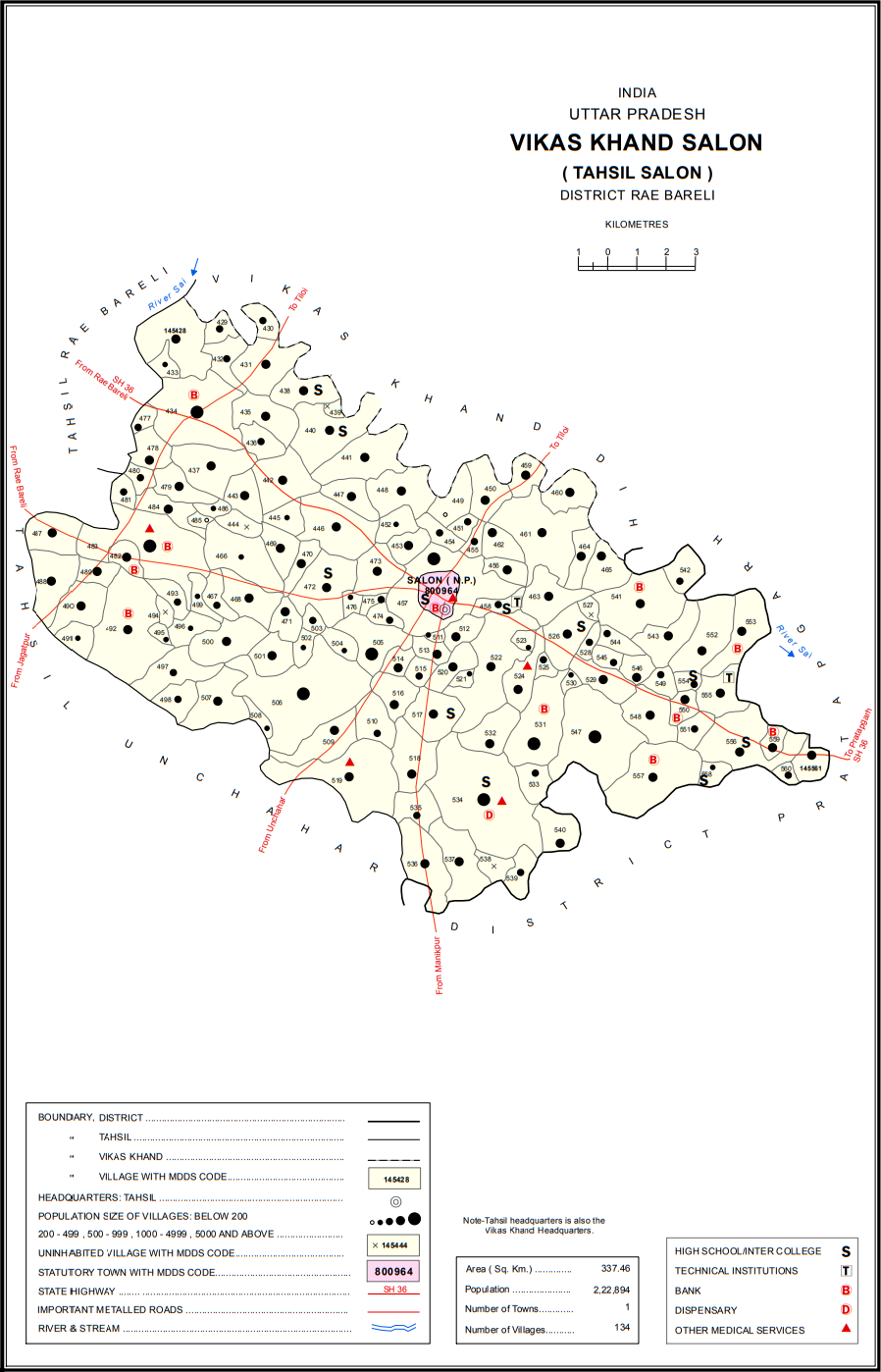
- Map showing Matka (#472) in Salon CD block

- Location in Uttar Pradesh, India
- Coordinates: 26.029659°N 81.414258°E
- Country India: India
- State: Uttar Pradesh
- District: Raebareli

Area
  - Total: 3.371 km^{2} (1.302 sq mi)

Population (2011)
  - Total: 3,479
  - Density: 1,032/km^{2} (2,673/sq mi)

Languages
  - Official: Hindi
- Time zone: UTC+5:30 (IST)
- Vehicle registration: UP-35

Matka is a village in Salon block of Rae Bareli district, Uttar Pradesh, India. It is located 35 km from Raebareli, the district headquarters. As of 2011, Matka has a population of 3,479 people, in 655 households. It has one primary school and no healthcare facilities.

The 1961 census recorded Matka as comprising 7 hamlets, with a total population of 1,447 people (701 male and 746 female), in 320 households and 314 physical houses. The area of the village was given as 305 acres.

The 1981 census recorded Matka as having a population of 2,048 people, in 561 households, and having an area of 345.60 hectares. The main staple foods were given as wheat and rice.
