= Jałowiec, Pomeranian Voivodeship =

Jałowiec
- Village
- Location within Poland
- Coordinates: 53°49′25″N 18°56′16″E
- Country: Poland
- Voivodeship: Pomeranian
- County: Kwidzyn
- Gmina: Ryjewo
- Population: 150

Jałowiec [jaˈwɔvjɛt͡s] (German: Unterwalde) is a village in the administrative district of Gmina Ryjewo, within Kwidzyn County, Pomeranian Voivodeship, in northern Poland.

For the history of the region, see History of Pomerania.
