= Bartolomeo Biasoletto =

Italian pharmacist, botanist and phycologist

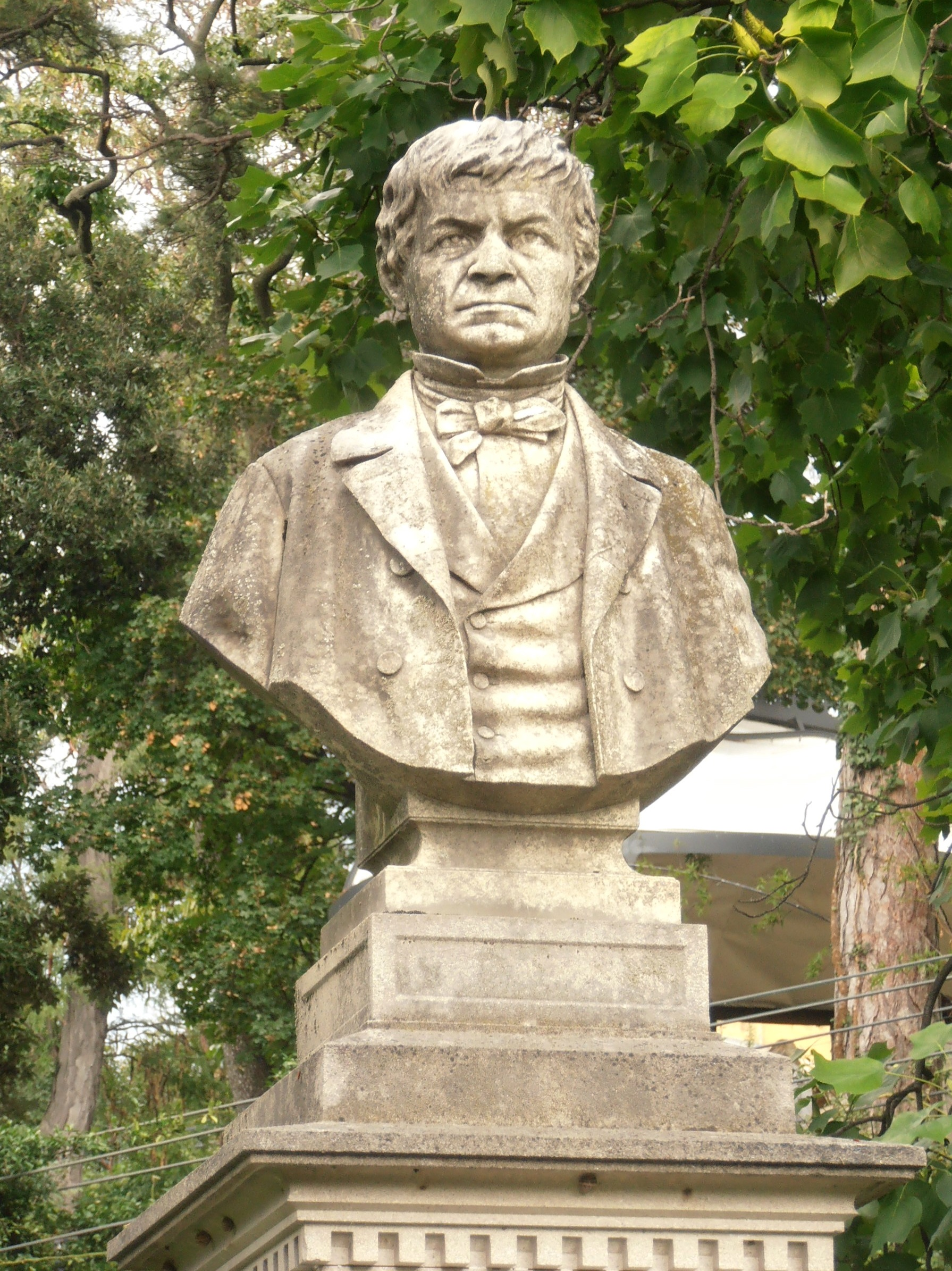
Bust of Bartolomeo Biasoletto in Trieste

Bartolomeo Biasoletto (24 April 1793 – 17 January 1858) was an Italian pharmacist, botanist and phycologist.

== Life ==
Biasoletto was born on 24 April 1793 in Vodnjan. In 1814 he received his degree in pharmacy at the University of Vienna, and after a short period of time working in Wels, he travelled to Trieste, where in 1817 he took over ownership of the Orso Negro pharmacy. In 1819 he met with David Heinrich Hoppe, director of the Regensburg Botanical Society, with whom he established a close friendship and a partnership for research. In 1820 he became a founding member of the pharmaceutical guild in Trieste, under the aegis of which, he later created the first botanical garden in Trieste. In 1823, he obtained his PhD from the University of Padua. He died on 17 January 1858 in Trieste.

He is best known for his investigations of flora found in Istria and Carniola, and also for his studies of marine algae. In 1836, in the retinue of Friedrich Augustus II of Saxony (who had a passion for botany), he participated in an extended excursion to Istria, Dalmatia and Montenegro, about which, he published the treatise Viaggio di S.M. Federico Augusto re di Sassonia per l’Istria, Dalmazia e Montenegro (1841).

In 1837, Wilhelm Daniel Joseph Koch, a professor at the University of Erlangen, named the genus Biasolettia (synonym Geocaryum) in his honor.

== Published works ==
- Bericht über eine Reise durch Istrien, in Flora, n. 33, 7 sett. 1829, pp. 513–525, e n. 34, pp. 529–541.
- Di alcune alghe microscopiche, Trieste 1832.
- Ueber microscopische in chemische Solutionen entstanden Algen, in Isis, 1833, coll. 452-453.
- Streifzug nach Istrien in Frühling 1833, mit besonderer Rücksicht auf die Botanik, in Linnaea, XI (1837), pp. 343–483.
- Ueber die Metamorphose der Algen, in Flora, n. 26, 14 luglio 1938, pp. 409–413.
- Ueber Hydrodictyon granulatum Bias. sp. n., ibid., p. 417.
- Sull'Hydrodictyon graniforme e sulla generazione spontanea di alcune Alghe inferiori, in Atti della I riunione d. Scienz. italiani, Pisa 1839, Pisa 1840, pp. 174–175.
- Escursioni botaniche nello Schneeberg (Monte Nevoso) in Carniola, Trieste 1846.
