= Straszewo, Pomeranian Voivodeship =

Straszewo
- Village
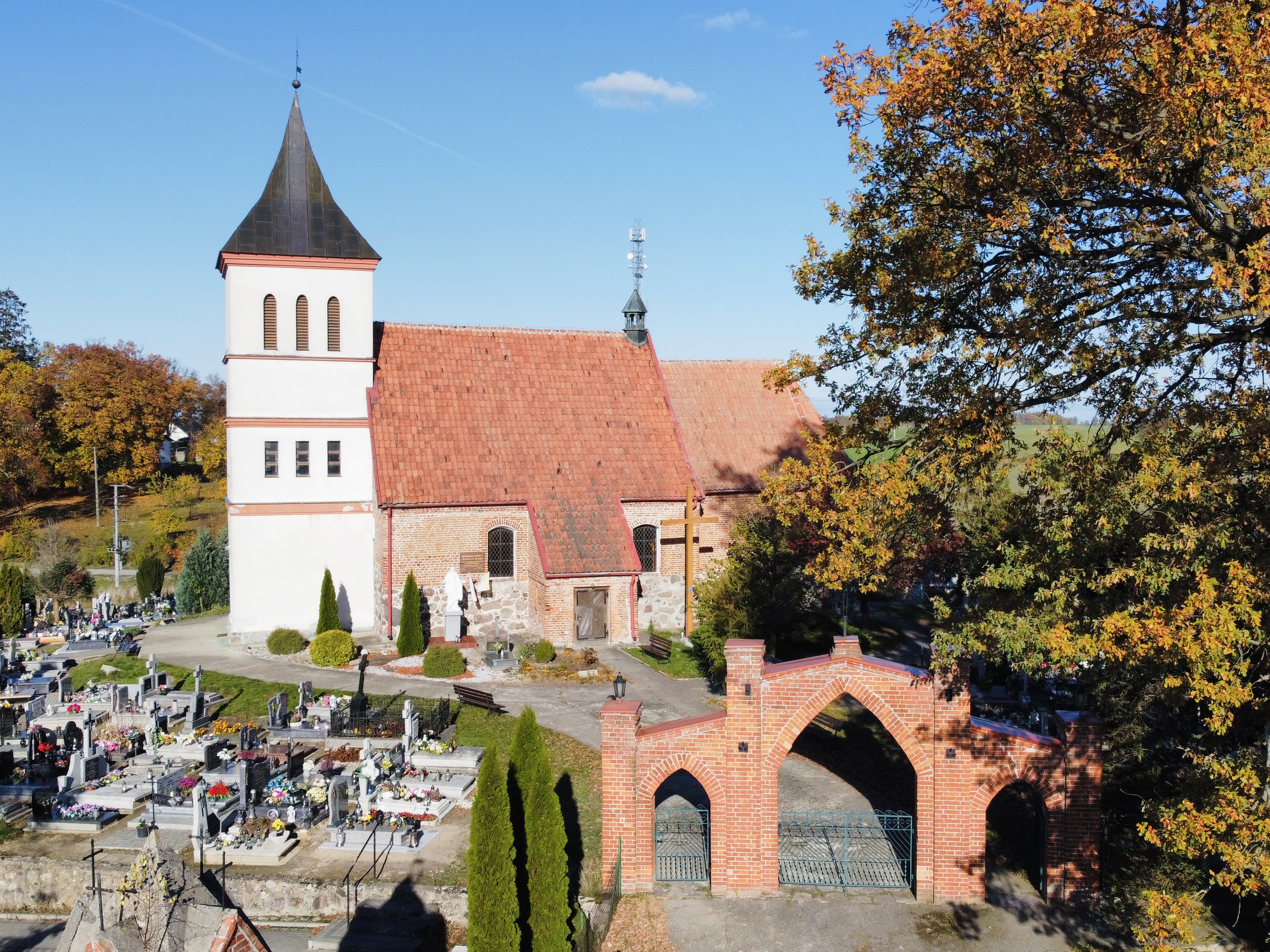
- Church in Straszewo

- Location within Poland
- Coordinates: 53°49′16″N 19°2′19″E
- Country: Poland
- Voivodeship: Pomeranian
- County: Kwidzyn
- Gmina: Ryjewo
- Population: 405

Straszewo [straˈʂɛvɔ] (German: Dietrichsdorf in Westpreußen) is a village in the administrative district of Gmina Ryjewo, within Kwidzyn County, Pomeranian Voivodeship, in northern Poland.

Before 1772 the area was part of Kingdom of Poland, in 1772-1945 it belonged to Prussia and Germany, and in 1945 it returned to Poland. For the history of the region, see History of Pomerania.
