= Polaszki =

- Village
- Location within Poland
- Coordinates: 53°51′32″N 19°3′45″E
- Country: Poland
- Voivodeship: Pomeranian
- County: Sztum
- Gmina: Sztum
- Population: 110

Polaszki [pɔˈlaʂki] is a village in the administrative district of Gmina Sztum, within Sztum County, Pomeranian Voivodeship, in northern Poland.
