= Muzio Tommasini =

Austrian botanist and politician (1794–1879)

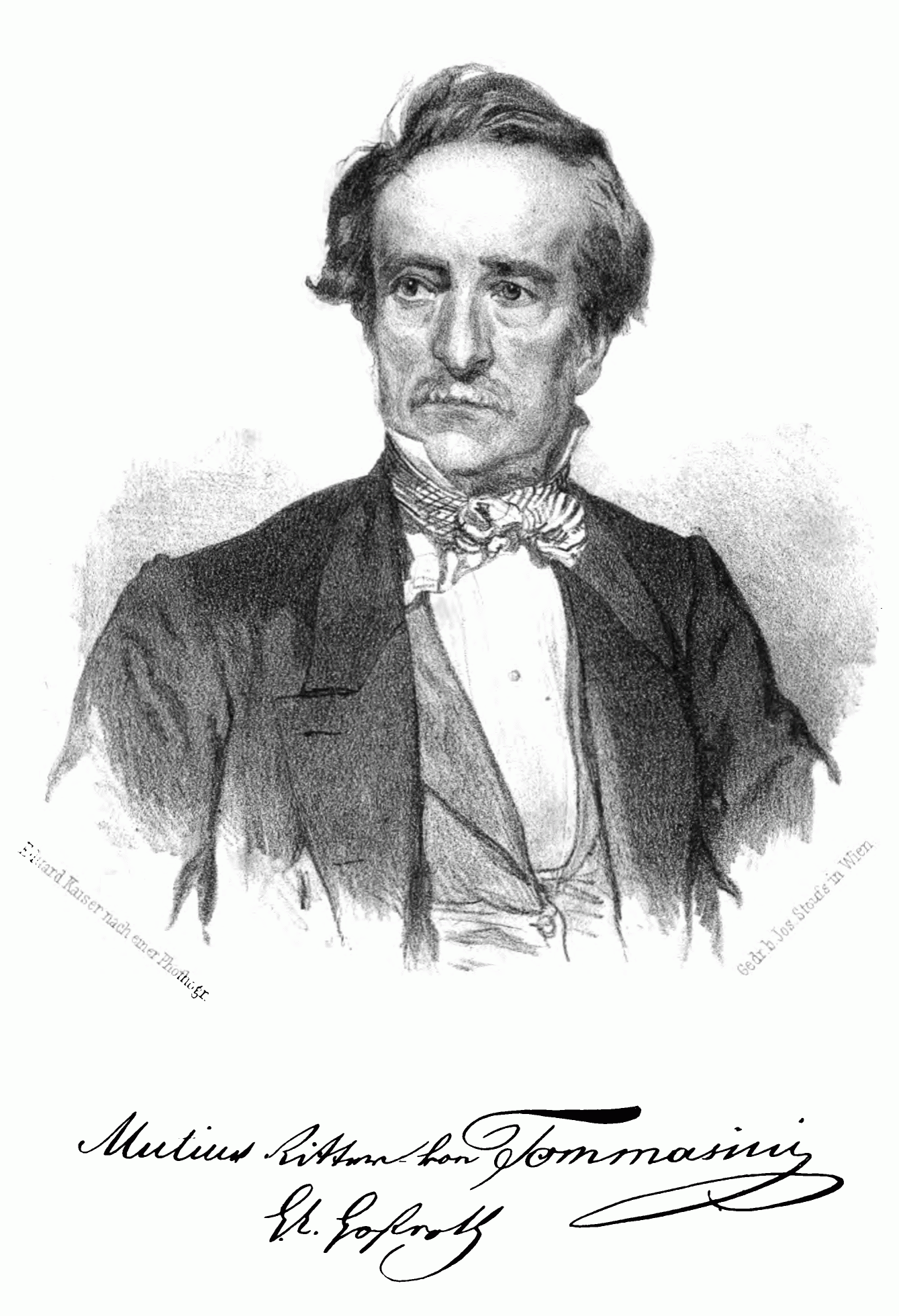
Muzio de Tommasini (1794-1879)

Muzio Giuseppe Spirito de Tommasini, sometimes referred to as Muzio Tommasini or as Mutius von Tommasini (4 June 1794 – 31 December 1879) was a botanist and politician born in Trieste when it was part of the Holy Roman Empire.

He first became interested in botany as a grammar school student in Ljubljana. While studying medicine at the University of Vienna, he was inspired by the work of professor Joseph Franz von Jacquin (1766-1839), and conducted investigations of flora in the vicinity of Vienna. Afterwards, Tommasini studied law at the University of Graz.

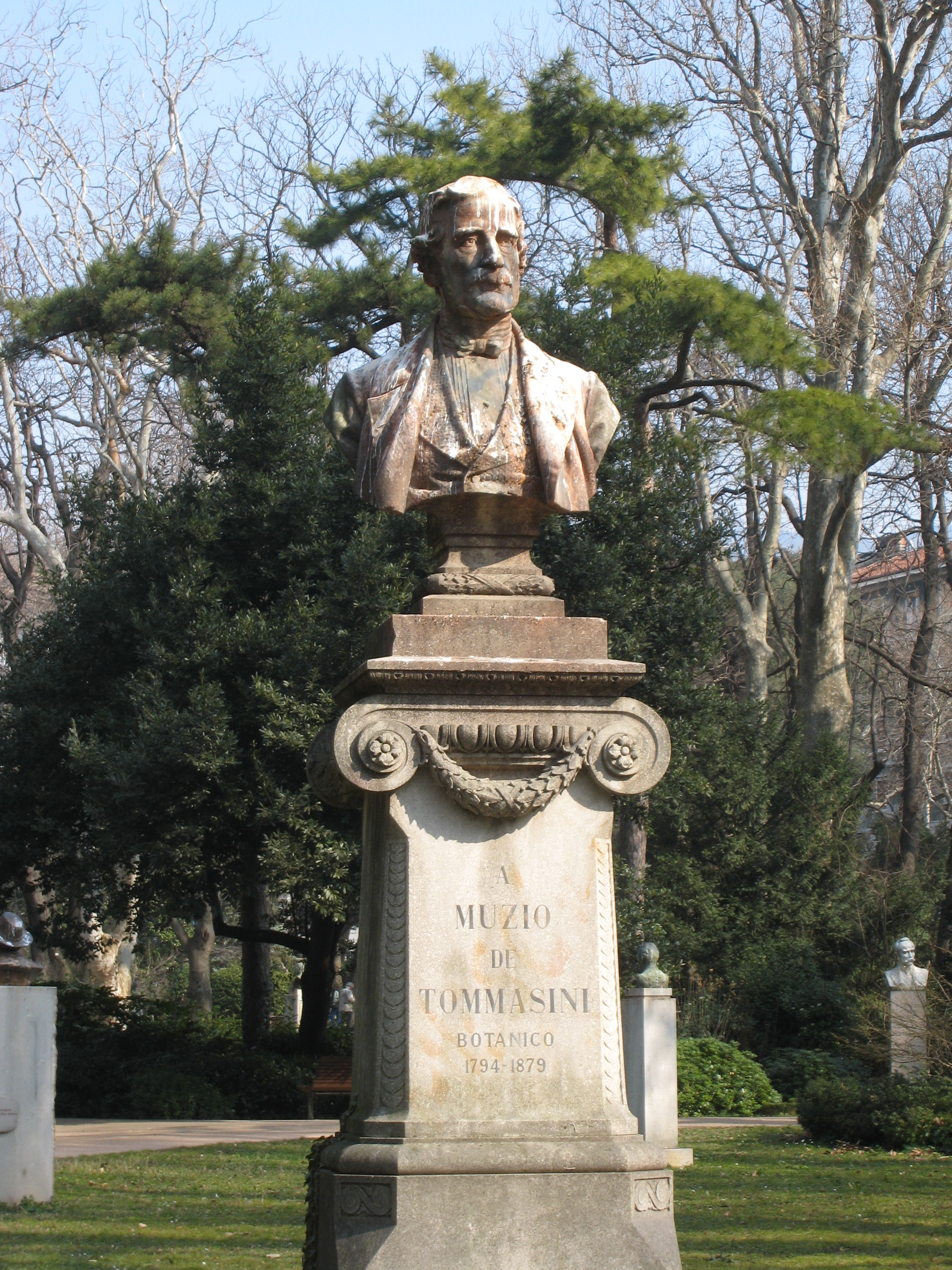
Bust of Muzio de Tommasini in Trieste

A career politician, he received his first appointment in 1817 as an official in the district of Istria. During the following year he was elected district secretary of the city of Split. From 1839 to 1860 he was mayor of Trieste. Following his retirement in 1860, he devoted his time to investigations of local flora.

As a botanist he participated in several noteworthy expeditions. Early in his career he took exploratory trips to the Biokovo Mountains in 1823 and to Dalmatia in 1827. In 1832 he accompanied Nicolas-Théodore de Saussure (1767-1845) on a botanical excursion through the Austrian Littoral, and in 1837 with British botanist George Bentham (1800-1884) he carried out studies in the regions of Carniola, Carinthia and Friuli.

After his election as mayor in 1839, his scientific studies were largely confined to the vicinity of Trieste. However, in 1840 he journeyed to the Julian Alps, where he scaled Monte Matajur. Soon afterwards he collaborated with Otto Sendtner (1813-1859) on an exploratory trip to the coastal areas of Austria, where plants for an herbarium were collected.

Tommasini played an important part in the creation of the Civico Museo di Storia Naturale di Trieste. The species Crocus tommasinianus is named in his honor. This plant is commonly referred to as Elfenkrokus (elfin crocus) in Germany, and sometimes as "tommies" or "tommy" in English speaking countries.

Other species named after him include Moehringia tommasinii, narrow endemite with range from his hometown of Triest over Slovenia to N Istria in Croatia, and Potentilla tommasiniana, species of calcareous dry grasslands of W Balkan peninsula.
