= Mątki, Pomeranian Voivodeship =

Mątki
- Village
- Location within Poland
- Coordinates: 53°51′10″N 19°0′0″E
- Country: Poland
- Voivodeship: Pomeranian
- County: Kwidzyn
- Gmina: Ryjewo
- Population: 38

Mątki [ˈmɔntki] is a village in the administrative district of Gmina Ryjewo, within Kwidzyn County, Pomeranian Voivodeship, in northern Poland.

Before 1772 the area was part of Kingdom of Poland, in 1772-1945 it belonged to Prussia and Germany, and in 1945 it returned to Poland. For the history of the region, see History of Pomerania.
