= Jaromierz =

Jaromierz may refer to the following places:

- Jaromierz, Greater Poland Voivodeship (west-central Poland)
- Jaromierz, Człuchów County in Pomeranian Voivodeship (north Poland)
- Jaromierz, Kwidzyn County in Pomeranian Voivodeship (north Poland)
- Jaromierz, Kamień County in West Pomeranian Voivodeship (northwest Poland)
- Jaromierz Polanowski, West Pomeranian Voivodeship, northwest Poland

== See also ==
- Jaroměř, Czech town
