= Nowa Wioska, Pomeranian Voivodeship =

Nowa Wioska
- Village
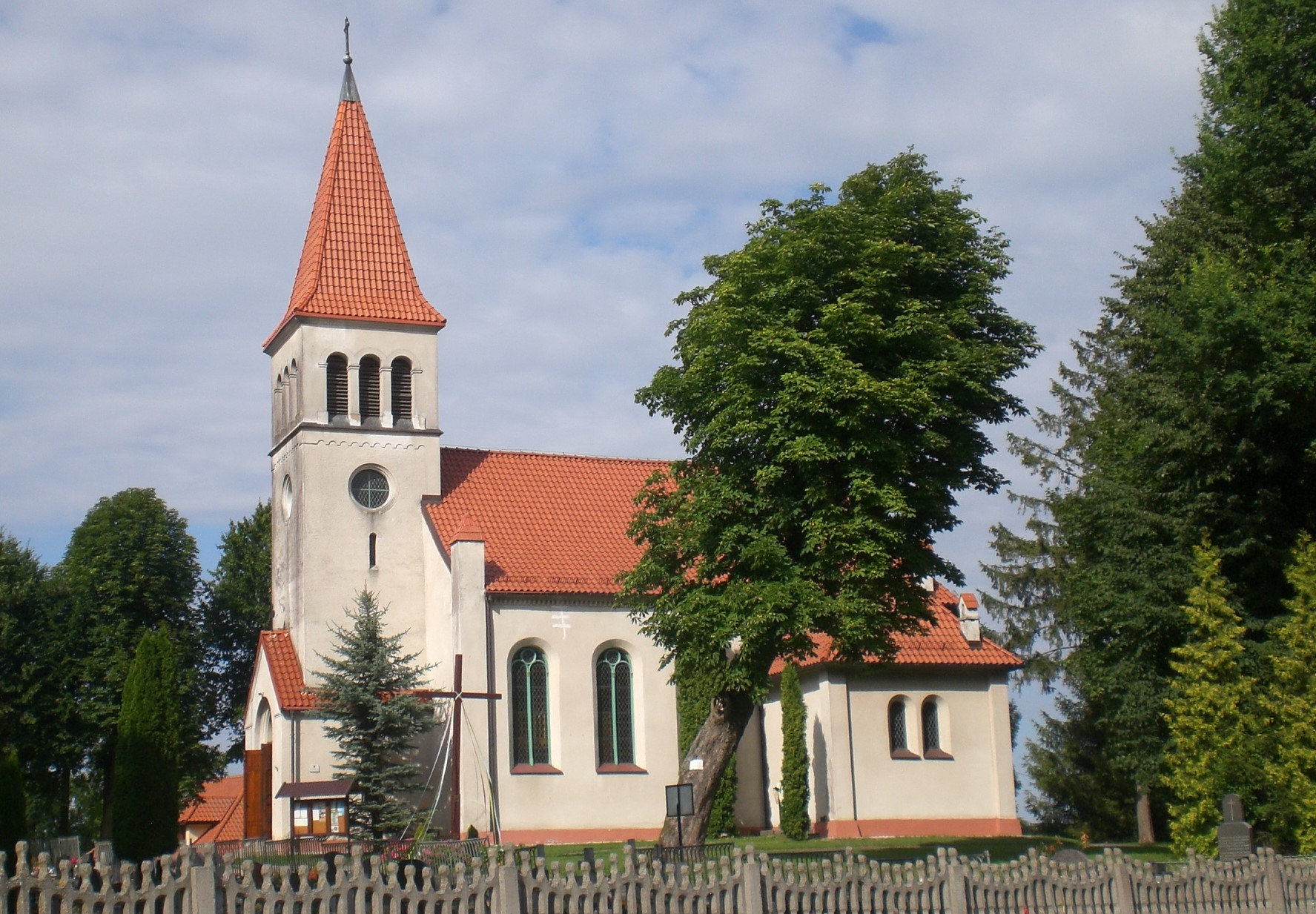
- Church of the Annunciation in Nowa Wioska

- Location within Poland
- Coordinates: 53°40′52″N 19°5′5″E
- Country: Poland
- Voivodeship: Pomeranian
- County: Kwidzyn
- Gmina: Gardeja
- Population: 490
- Vehicle registration: GKW

Nowa Wioska [ˈnɔva ˈvjɔska] is a village in the administrative district of Gmina Gardeja, within Kwidzyn County, Pomeranian Voivodeship, in northern Poland. It is located in the region of Powiśle.

== Sights ==
According to the National Heritage Board of Poland register of monuments, the following heritage monuments are included in the list:

- rural complex with residential and farm buildings and greenery, 14th-19th century, registration number: 129/89 of 18/07/1990
- eclectic parish church of the Annunciation of the Blessed Virgin Mary, 1844-45, registration number: 467/95 of 3 July 1995
- church cemetery, registration number: as above

The village boasts an eclectic palace, rebuilt in the 19th century in the style of a French chateau, with side wings and a semi-oval projection on the garden façade. Adjacent to the palace are 18th- and 19th-century farm buildings, including a stately stable, a granary, and the so-called old monastery. The extensive park contains numerous specimens of historic and exotic trees, as well as contemporary horse sculptures. The estate has been known since 1567, when it was in the hands of the Heydeck family. In the 17th century, the estate was taken over by the von Kerssenstein family, and in 1693 by the von Groeben family, who resided here until 1945 along with the Krasucki family of the Krajewski family.
