= Krzykosy, Pomeranian Voivodeship =

Krzykosy
- Village
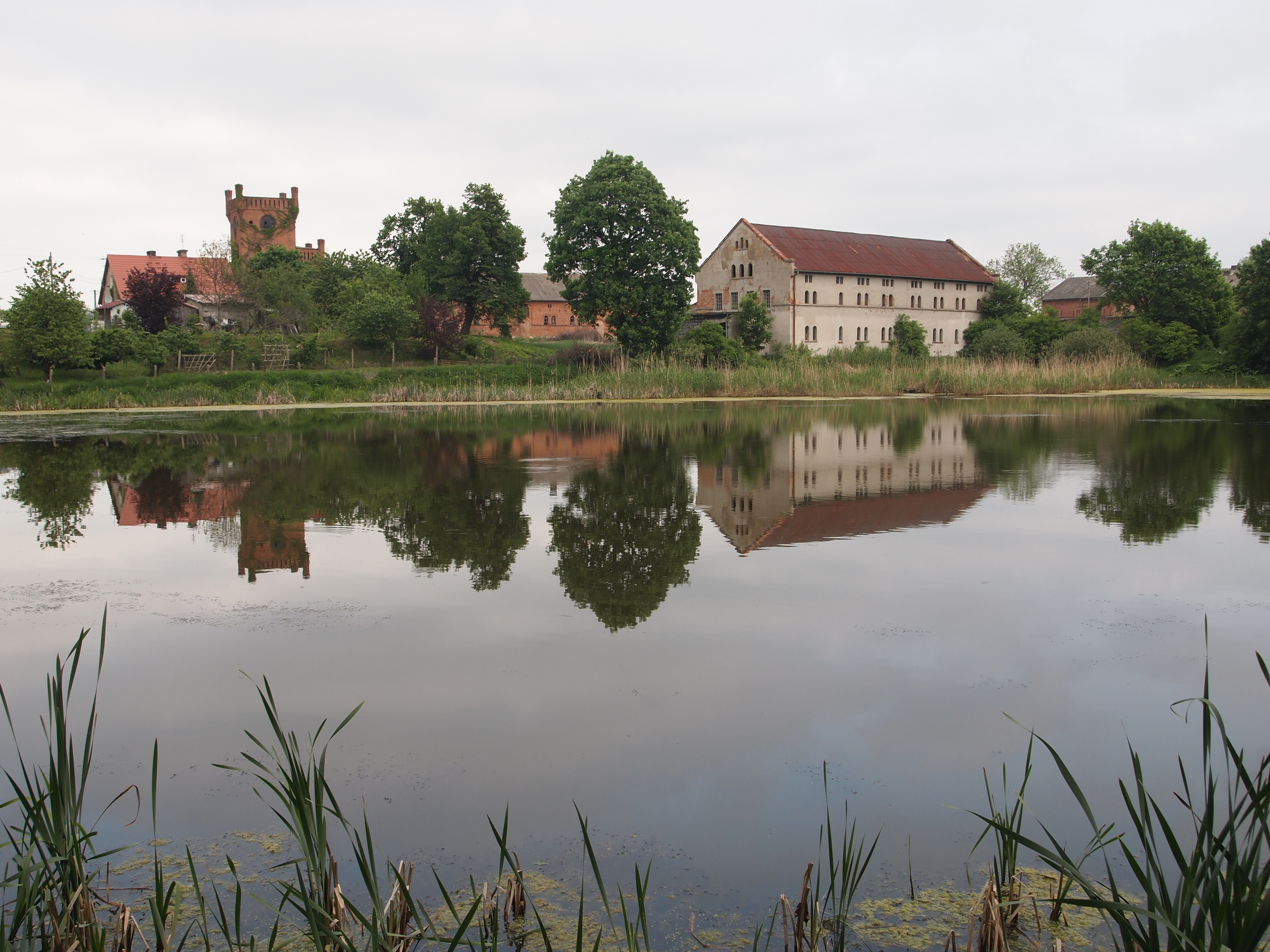

- Location within Poland
- Coordinates: 53°41′0″N 19°1′6″E
- Country: Poland
- Voivodeship: Pomeranian
- County: Kwidzyn
- Gmina: Gardeja

Population
  - Total: 290
- Time zone: UTC+1 (CET)
  - Summer (DST): UTC+2 (CEST)
- Vehicle registration: GKW

Krzykosy [kʂɨˈkɔsɨ] is a village in the administrative district of Gmina Gardeja, within Kwidzyn County, Pomeranian Voivodeship, in northern Poland. It is located in the region of Powiśle.
