= History of Łasin =

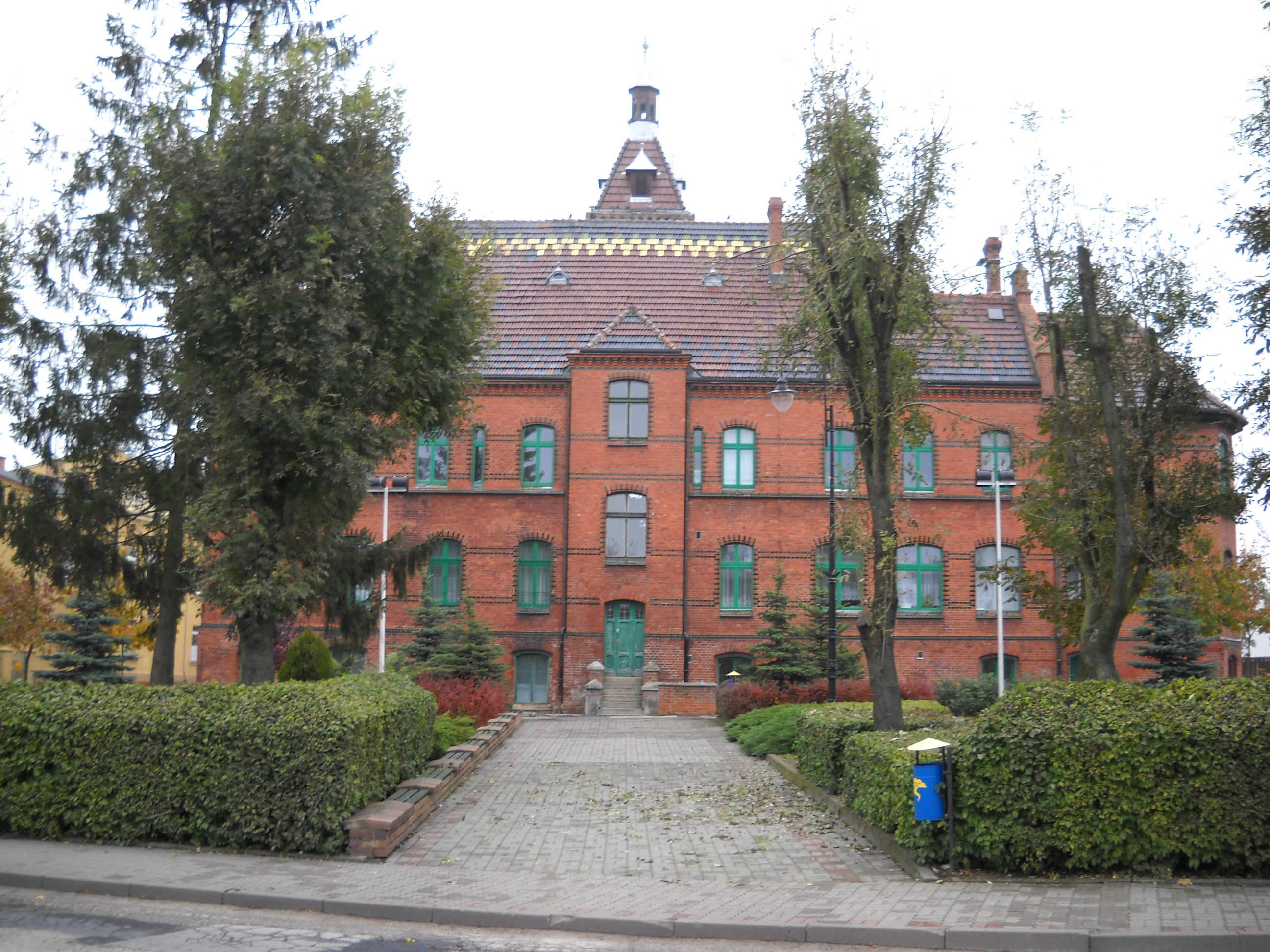
Łasin Town Hall

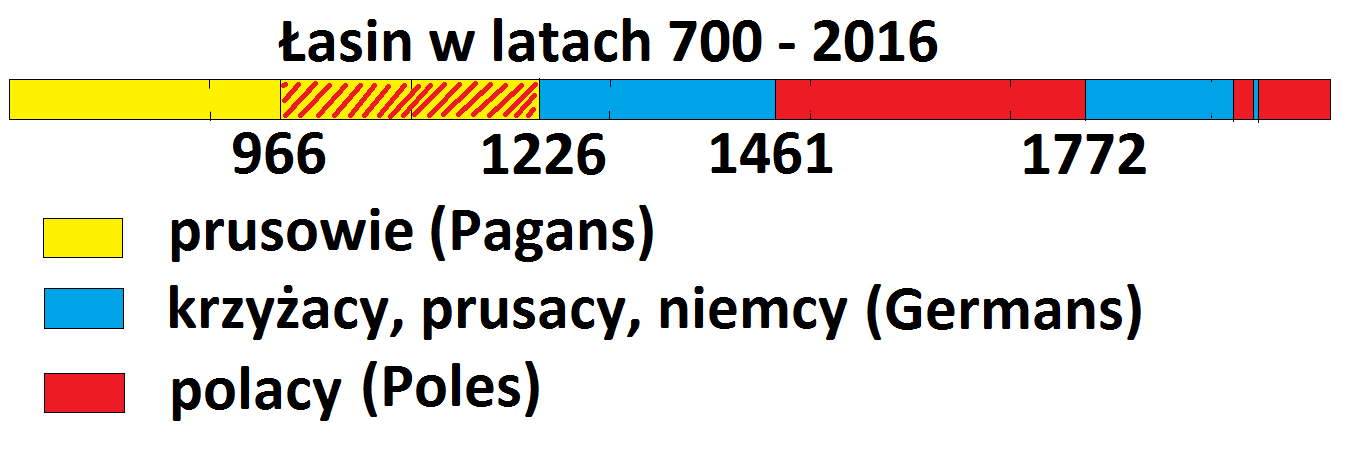
History of Łasin

The history of Łasin dates back to the Neolithic period (2500-1700 B.C.), where evidence of the first humans in the area is found. 1014 is the first year a town called "Łasin" was mentioned in historical sources.

== Timeline ==
1014 - The first historical information about the existence of a settlement called Lasin

1298 - town rights under the Magdeburg Law

1306 - municipal rights Chelmno law

1455 - branches of the Teutonic Knights of Kwidzyn and Łasin invaded Grudziądz and burned its suburbs, and granaries.

1461 - Lasin returned to the Polish state

July 16, 1526 - Sigismund I the Old confirmed the privileges granted to the town in the days of the Teutonic Knights

1628 - the town was burned by the Swedes

1719 - the great fire in the town

1772 - due to the First Partition of Poland Łasin was attached to Prussia

1833 - loss of civic rights

1860 - recovery of civic rights

1886 - the railway line linking Łasin with Gardeja was built

1892 - demolished town walls

1900 - Town Hall was built

1920 - Łasin return to the Second Polish Republic

September 1, 1939, about 11 A.M. - the town was occupied by Wehrmacht

January 26, 1945 - the town was captured by the Red Army
