= Klecewo, Kwidzyn County =

Klecewo
- Village
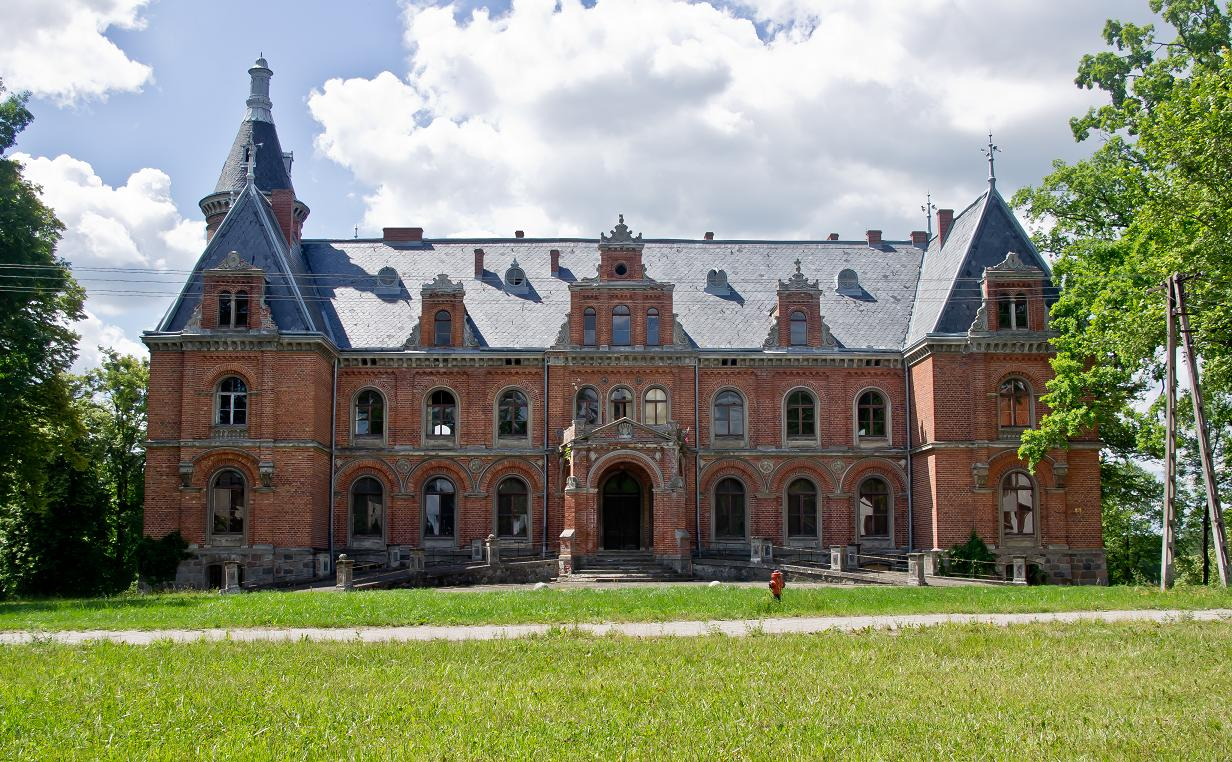
- Palace in Klecewo

- Location within Poland
- Coordinates: 53°38′10″N 19°6′40″E
- Country: Poland
- Voivodeship: Pomeranian
- County: Kwidzyn
- Gmina: Gardeja
- Population: 230
- Time zone: UTC+1 (CET)
  - Summer (DST): UTC+2 (CEST)

Klecewo [klɛˈt͡sɛvɔ] is a village in the administrative district of Gmina Gardeja, within Kwidzyn County, Pomeranian Voivodeship, in northern Poland. It is located in the region of Powiśle.
