= Rozajny Małe =

- Village
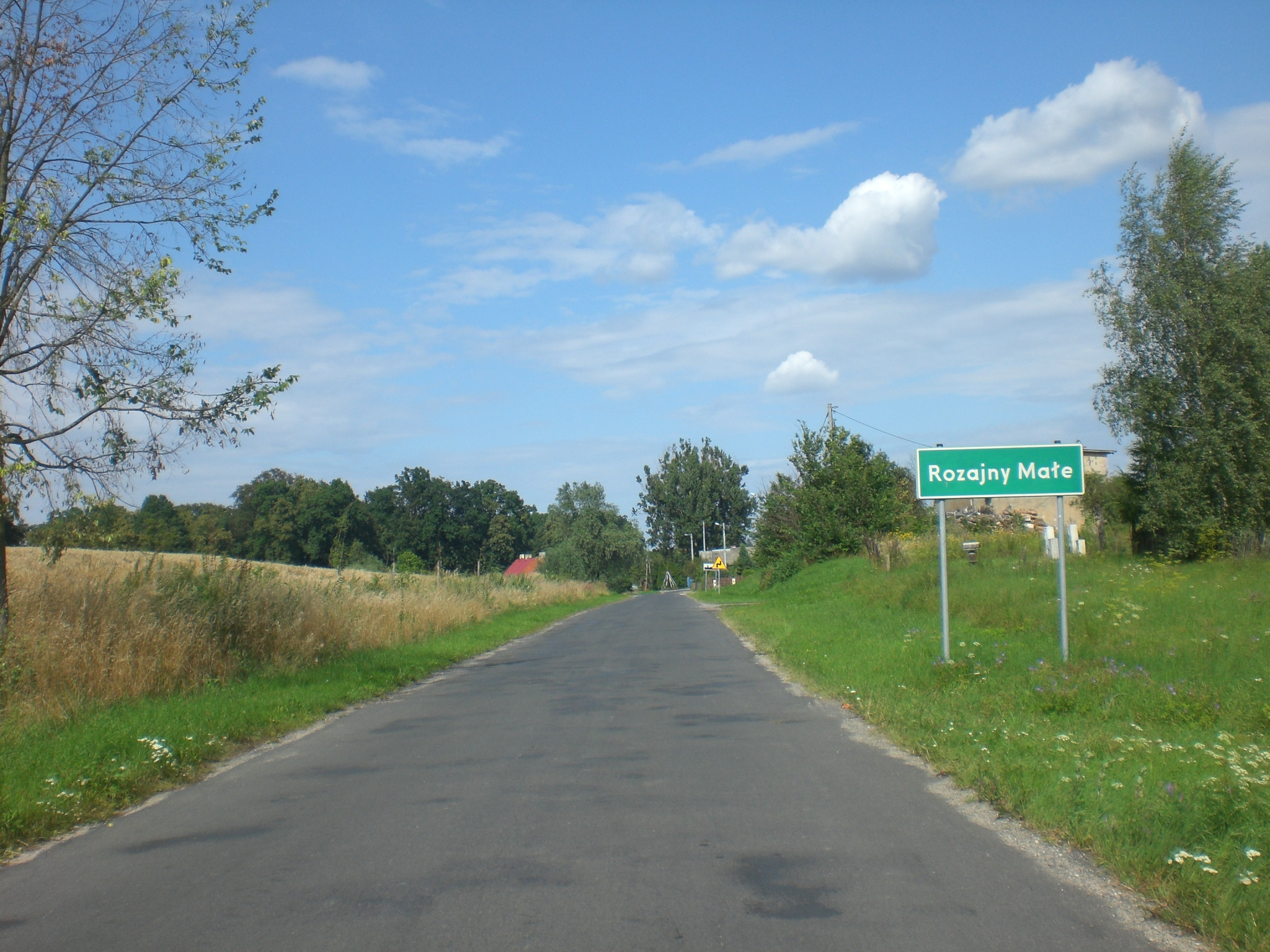

- Location within Poland
- Coordinates: 53°39′18″N 19°4′0″E
- Country: Poland
- Voivodeship: Pomeranian
- County: Kwidzyn
- Gmina: Gardeja
- Time zone: UTC+1 (CET)
  - Summer (DST): UTC+2 (CEST)
- Vehicle registration: GKW

Rozajny Małe [rɔˈzai̯nɨ ˈmawɛ] is a village in the administrative district of Gmina Gardeja, within Kwidzyn County, Pomeranian Voivodeship, in northern Poland. It is located in the region of Powiśle.
