= Bądki =

Bądki may refer to:

- Bądki, Pomeranian Voivodeship, Poland
- Bądki, Warmian-Masurian Voivodeship, Poland
