= Otłowiec =

- Village
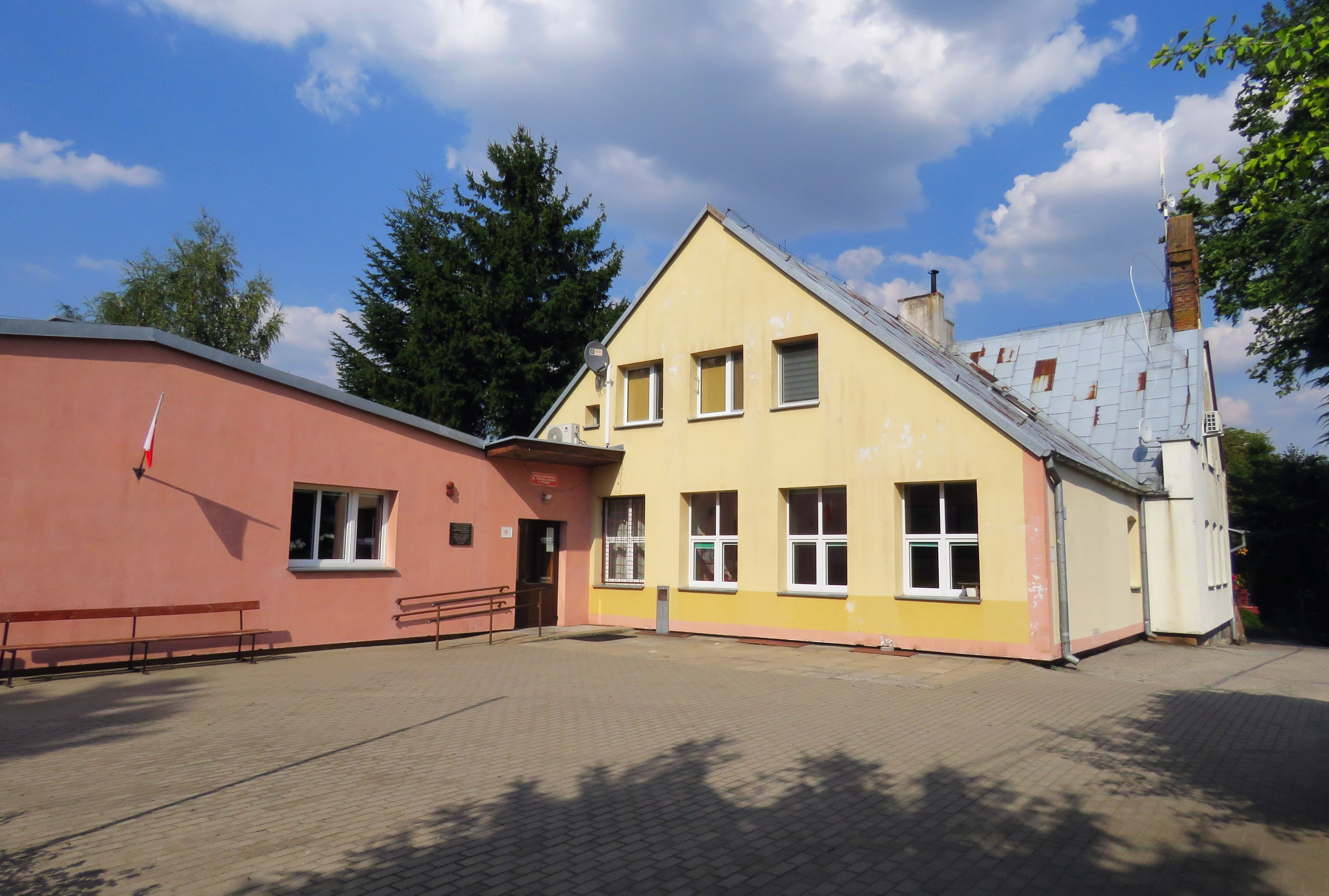
- Elementary school in Otłowiec

- Location within Poland
- Coordinates: 53°38′40″N 18°57′15″E
- Country: Poland
- Voivodeship: Pomeranian
- County: Kwidzyn
- Gmina: Gardeja
- Population: 524
- Time zone: UTC+1 (CET)
  - Summer (DST): UTC+2 (CEST)
- Vehicle registration: GKW

Otłowiec [ɔˈtwɔvjɛt͡s] is a village in the administrative district of Gmina Gardeja, within Kwidzyn County, Pomeranian Voivodeship, in northern Poland. It is located in the region of Powiśle.
