= Klasztorne, Pomeranian Voivodeship =

Klasztorne
- Village
- Location within Poland
- Coordinates: 53°40′35″N 19°6′43″E
- Country: Poland
- Voivodeship: Pomeranian
- County: Kwidzyn
- Gmina: Gardeja

Population
  - Total: 240
- Time zone: UTC+1 (CET)
  - Summer (DST): UTC+2 (CEST)
- Vehicle registration: GKW

Klasztorne [klaʂˈtɔrnɛ] is a village in the administrative district of Gmina Gardeja, within Kwidzyn County, Pomeranian Voivodeship, in northern Poland. It is located in the region of Powiśle.
