= Podegrodzie =

Podegrodzie may refer to the following places:

- Podegrodzie, Lesser Poland Voivodeship (south Poland)
- Podegrodzie, Pomeranian Voivodeship (north Poland)
- Podegrodzie, West Pomeranian Voivodeship (north-west Poland)
