= Czachówek, Pomeranian Voivodeship =

Czachówek
- Village
- Location within Poland
- Coordinates: 53°40′54″N 18°58′19″E
- Country: Poland
- Voivodeship: Pomeranian
- County: Kwidzyn
- Gmina: Gardeja
- Population: 140

Czachówek [t͡ʂaˈxuvɛk] is a village in the administrative district of Gmina Gardeja, within Kwidzyn County, Pomeranian Voivodeship, in northern Poland.

For the history of the region, see History of Pomerania.
