= Czarne Małe, Pomeranian Voivodeship =

Czarne Małe
- Village
- Location within Poland
- Coordinates: 53°38′24″N 19°2′55″E
- Country: Poland
- Voivodeship: Pomeranian
- County: Kwidzyn
- Gmina: Gardeja
- Population: 330

Czarne Małe [ˈt͡ʂarnɛ ˈmawɛ] is a village in the administrative district of Gmina Gardeja, within Kwidzyn County, Pomeranian Voivodeship, in northern Poland.

For the history of the region, see History of Pomerania.
