= Hermanowo, Pomeranian Voivodeship =

Hermanowo
- Village
- Location within Poland
- Coordinates: 53°35′54″N 18°54′19″E
- Country: Poland
- Voivodeship: Pomeranian
- County: Kwidzyn
- Gmina: Gardeja

Hermanowo [xɛrmaˈnɔvɔ] is a village in the administrative district of Gmina Gardeja, within Kwidzyn County, Pomeranian Voivodeship, in northern Poland.

For the history of the region, see History of Pomerania.
