= Czarne Górne =

- Village
- Location within Poland
- Coordinates: 53°37′9″N 19°4′43″E
- Country: Poland
- Voivodeship: Pomeranian
- County: Kwidzyn
- Gmina: Gardeja
- Population: 270

Czarne Górne [ˈt͡ʂarnɛ ˈɡurnɛ] is a village in the administrative district of Gmina Gardeja, within Kwidzyn County, Pomeranian Voivodeship, in northern Poland.

For the history of the region, see History of Pomerania.
