= Dębno, Pomeranian Voivodeship =

Dębno
- Settlement
- Location within Poland
- Coordinates: 53°36′26″N 18°53′35″E
- Country: Poland
- Voivodeship: Pomeranian
- County: Kwidzyn
- Gmina: Gardeja

Dębno [ˈdɛmbnɔ] is a settlement in the administrative district of Gmina Gardeja, within Kwidzyn County, Pomeranian Voivodeship, in northern Poland.

For the region's history, see History of Pomerania.
