= Gmina Gardeja =

Gmina Gardeja Gardeja Commune
- Gmina
- Coat of arms
- Interactive map of Gmina Gardeja
- Coordinates (Gardeja): 53°36′26″N 18°56′28″E
- Country: Poland
- Voivodeship: Pomeranian
- County: Kwidzyn
- Seat: Gardeja

Area
  - Total: 192.98 km^{2} (74.51 sq mi)

Population (2006)
  - Total: 8,223
  - Density: 42.61/km^{2} (110.4/sq mi)
- Website: http://www.gardeja.pl/

Gmina Gardeja is a rural gmina (administrative district) in Kwidzyn County, Pomeranian Voivodeship, in northern Poland. Its seat is the village of Gardeja, which lies approximately 15 kilometres (9 mi) south of Kwidzyn and 87 km (54 mi) south of the regional capital Gdańsk.

The gmina covers an area of 192.98 square kilometres (74.5 sq mi), and as of 2006 its total population is 8,223.

== Neighbouring gminas ==
Gmina Gardeja is bordered by the town of Kwidzyn and by the gminas of Kisielice, Kwidzyn, Łasin, Prabuty, Rogóźno and Sadlinki.

== Villages ==
The gmina contains the following villages having the status of sołectwo: Bądki, Cygany, Czarne Dolne, Czarne Górne, Czarne Małe (sołectwos: Czarne Małe I and Czarne Małe II), Gardeja (sołectwos: Gardeja, Gardeja II, Gardeja III and Gradeja IV), Jaromierz, Klasztorek, Krzykosy, Morawy, Nowa Wioska, Otłowiec, Otłówko, Otoczyn, Pawłowo, Rozajny, Trumieje, Wandowo, Wracławek and Zebrdowo.

Other villages and settlements include: Albertowo, Czachówek, Dębno, Hermanowo, Jurki, Kalmuzy, Karolewo, Klasztorne, Klecewo, Międzylesie, Olszówka, Osadniki, Podegrodzie, Przęsławek, Rozajny Małe, Szczepkowo and Wilkowo.
