= Jurki, Pomeranian Voivodeship =

Jurki
- Settlement
- Location within Poland
- Coordinates: 53°40′17″N 19°4′3″E
- Country: Poland
- Voivodeship: Pomeranian
- County: Kwidzyn
- Gmina: Gardeja

Jurki [ˈjurki] is a settlement in the administrative district of Gmina Gardeja, within Kwidzyn County, Pomeranian Voivodeship, in northern Poland.

For the history of the region, see History of Pomerania.
