= Czarne Dolne =

- Village
- Location within Poland
- Coordinates: 53°36′58″N 19°4′3″E
- Country: Poland
- Voivodeship: Pomeranian
- County: Kwidzyn
- Gmina: Gardeja
- Population: 500

Czarne Dolne [ˈt͡ʂarnɛ ˈdɔlnɛ] is a village in the administrative district of Gmina Gardeja, within Kwidzyn County, Pomeranian Voivodeship, in northern Poland.

For the history of the region, see History of Pomerania.
