= Karolewo, Kwidzyn County =

Karolewo
- Village
- Location within Poland
- Coordinates: 53°38′10″N 18°56′34″E
- Country: Poland
- Voivodeship: Pomeranian
- County: Kwidzyn
- Gmina: Gardeja

Karolewo [karɔˈlɛvɔ] is a village in the administrative district of Gmina Gardeja, within Kwidzyn County, Pomeranian Voivodeship, in northern Poland.

For the history of the region, see History of Pomerania.
