= Jaromierz, Kwidzyn County =

Jaromierz
- Village
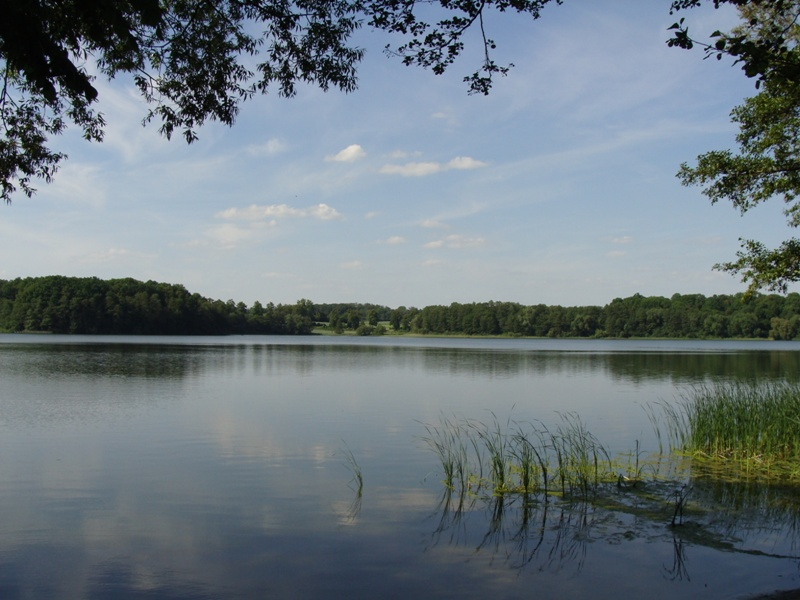
- Kucki Lake

- Location within Poland
- Coordinates: 53°39′23″N 19°8′27″E
- Country: Poland
- Voivodeship: Pomeranian
- County: Kwidzyn
- Gmina: Gardeja

Population
  - Total: 160
- Time zone: UTC+1 (CET)
  - Summer (DST): UTC+2 (CEST)
- Vehicle registration: GKW

Jaromierz [jaˈrɔmjɛʂ] is a village in the administrative district of Gmina Gardeja, within Kwidzyn County, Pomeranian Voivodeship, in northern Poland. It is located on the northern shore of Kucki Lake in the region of Powiśle.
