= Kalmuzy =

- Village
- Location within Poland
- Coordinates: 53°35′37″N 18°55′53″E
- Country: Poland
- Voivodeship: Pomeranian
- County: Kwidzyn
- Gmina: Gardeja

Kalmuzy [kalˈmuzɨ] is a village in the administrative district of Gmina Gardeja, within Kwidzyn County, Pomeranian Voivodeship, in northern Poland.
