= Fiszewo, Warmian-Masurian Voivodeship =

Fiszewo
- Village
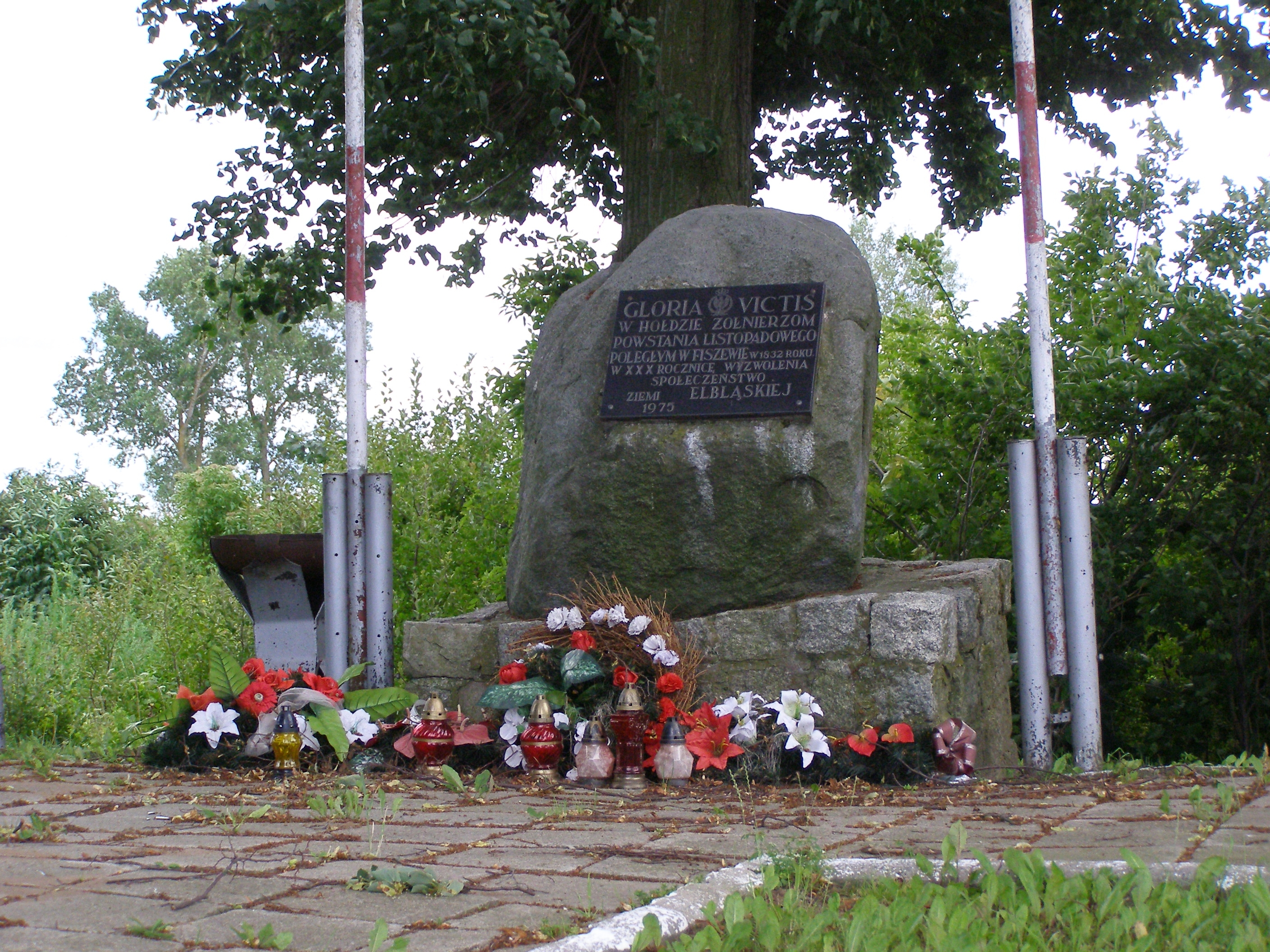
- Monument to Polish insurgents massacred by the Prussians in 1832

- Location within Poland
- Coordinates: 54°4′10″N 19°14′26″E
- Country: Poland
- Voivodeship: Warmian-Masurian
- County: Elbląg
- Gmina: Gronowo Elbląskie

Population
  - Total: 270
- Time zone: UTC+1 (CET)
  - Summer (DST): UTC+2 (CEST)
- Vehicle registration: NEB

Fiszewo [fiˈʂɛvɔ] is a village in the administrative district of Gmina Gronowo Elbląskie, within Elbląg County, Warmian-Masurian Voivodeship, in northern Poland. It is located in the region of Powiśle.

== History ==
Fiszewo was a royal village in the Malbork Voivodeship of the Kingdom of Poland. It was annexed by Prussia in the First Partition of Poland in 1772. It was the site of a massacre of Polish insurgents of the November Uprising committed by the Prussians on 27 January 1832. Prussian troops opened fire on the Polish insurgents, killing eight and wounding twelve, another four of whom eventually died of wounds. There is a monument to the victims of the massacre in Fiszewo, and an annual rally is held to commemorate them.

== Transport ==
The National road 22 bypasses Fiszewo in the west.
