= Waplewo Wielkie =

- Village
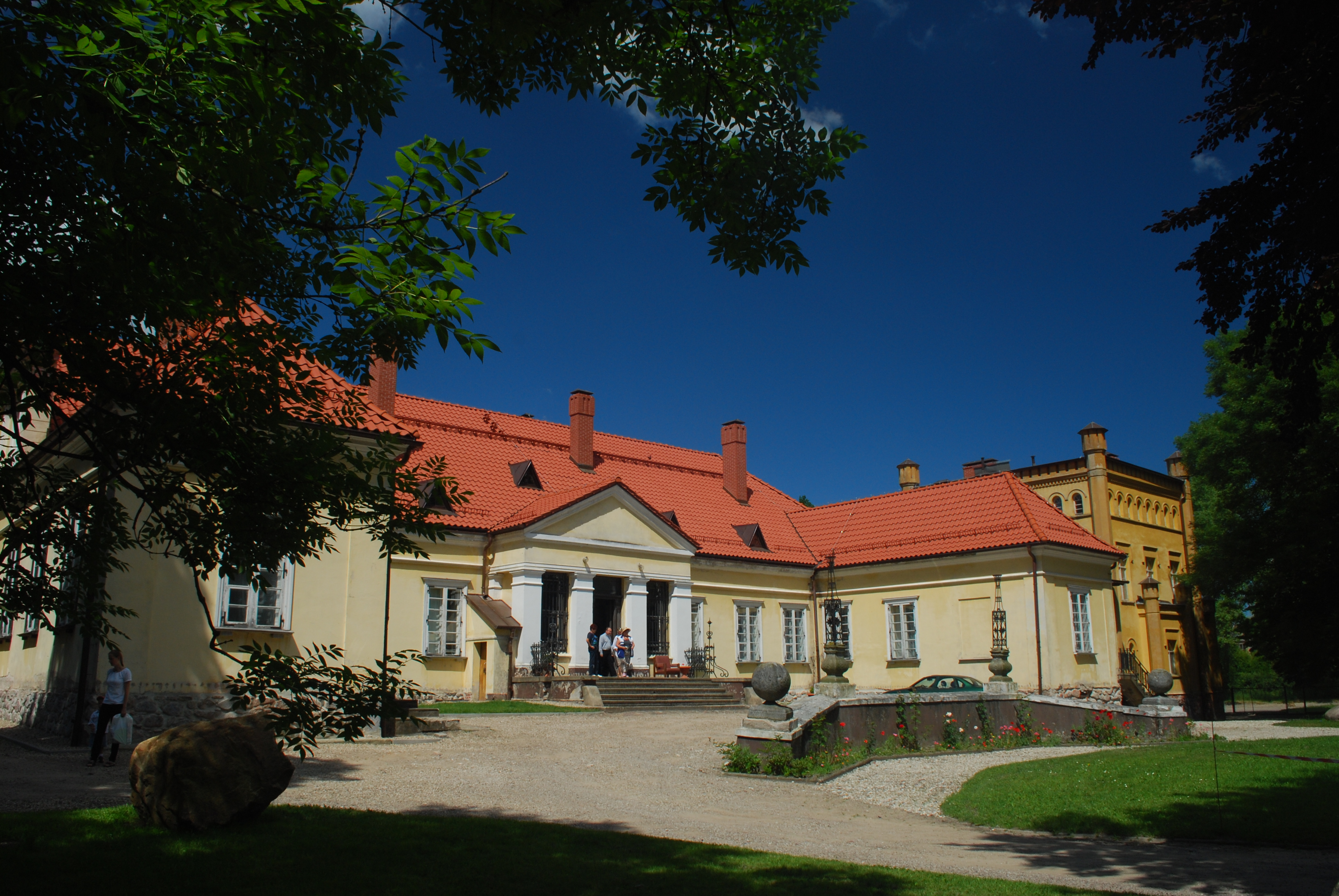
- Palace in the village

- Location within Poland
- Coordinates: 53°55′45″N 19°14′3″E
- Country: Poland
- Voivodeship: Pomeranian
- County: Sztum
- Gmina: Stary Targ

Population
  - Total: 1,032

Waplewo Wielkie [vaˈplɛvɔ ˈvjɛlkʲɛ] is a village in the administrative district of Gmina Stary Targ, within Sztum County, Pomeranian Voivodeship, in northern Poland.

Before 1772 the area was part of Kingdom of Poland, and in 1772–1945 it belonged to Prussia and Germany. For the history of the region, see History of Pomerania.

The village has a manor house, formerly owned by the Sierakowski family, with a garden laid out in English style.

The last owner of Waplewo was Stanisław Sierakowski (1881–1939) and his wife Helena, née Lubomirska (1886–1939). On 20 October 1939, Stanisław Sierakowski was arrested by the Volksdeutsche Selbstschutz and imprisoned in Rypin prison, where he was murdered after several days of torture together with his wife Helena, his daughter Teresa and her husband Tadeusz Gniazdowski.
