= Jaromierz, Kamień County =

Jaromierz
- Settlement (colony)
- Location within Poland
- Coordinates: 53°51′48″N 14°36′29″E
- Country: Poland
- Voivodeship: West Pomeranian
- County: Kamień
- Gmina: Wolin
- Time zone: UTC+1 (CET)
  - Summer (DST): UTC+2 (CEST)
- Postal code: 72-510
- Area code: +48 91

Jaromierz (Polish: [jaˈrɔ.mjɛʂ]) is a settlement (colony) in the West Pomeranian Voivodeship, Poland, located within the Gmina Wolin, Kamień County.
