= Gardeja =

- Village
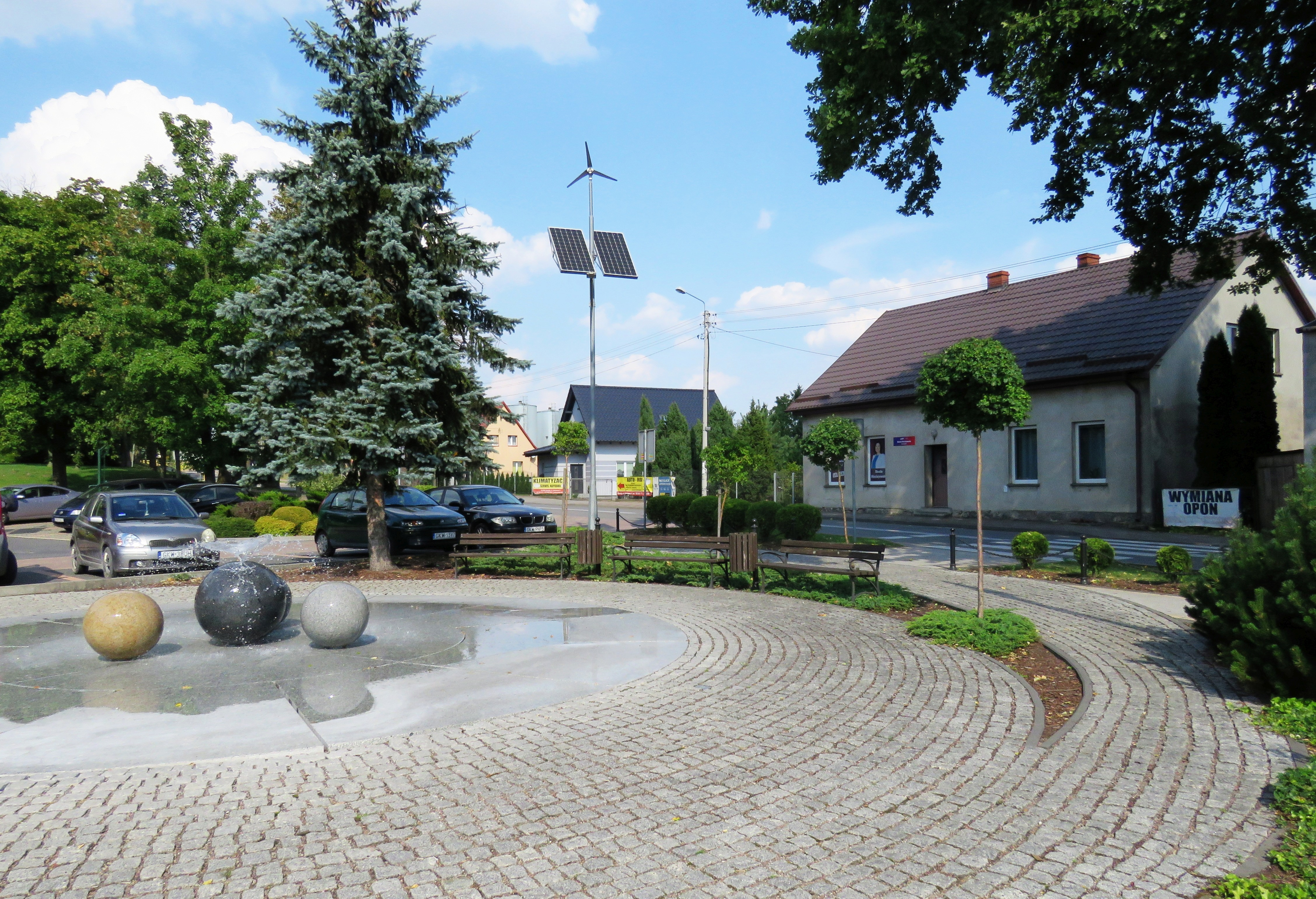

- Location within Poland
- Coordinates: 53°36′26″N 18°56′28″E
- Country: Poland
- Voivodeship: Pomeranian
- County: Kwidzyn
- Gmina: Gardeja
- granting city rights: 1334
- deprivation of city rights: 1945
- Population: 2,500 (2,006)
- Time zone: UTC+1 (CET)
  - Summer (DST): UTC+2 (CEST)
- Vehicle registration: GKW

Gardeja [ɡarˈdɛja] (German: Garnsee) is a village in Kwidzyn County, Pomeranian Voivodeship, in northern Poland. It is the seat of the gmina (administrative district) called Gmina Gardeja. It had been a town during the time span 1334–1945.

== Geographical location ==
Gardeja lies approximately 15 km (9 mi) south of Kwidzyn and 87 km (54 mi) south of the regional capital of Gdańsk. The village is located between two little lakes on the road from Kwidzyn to Grudziądz.

== History ==
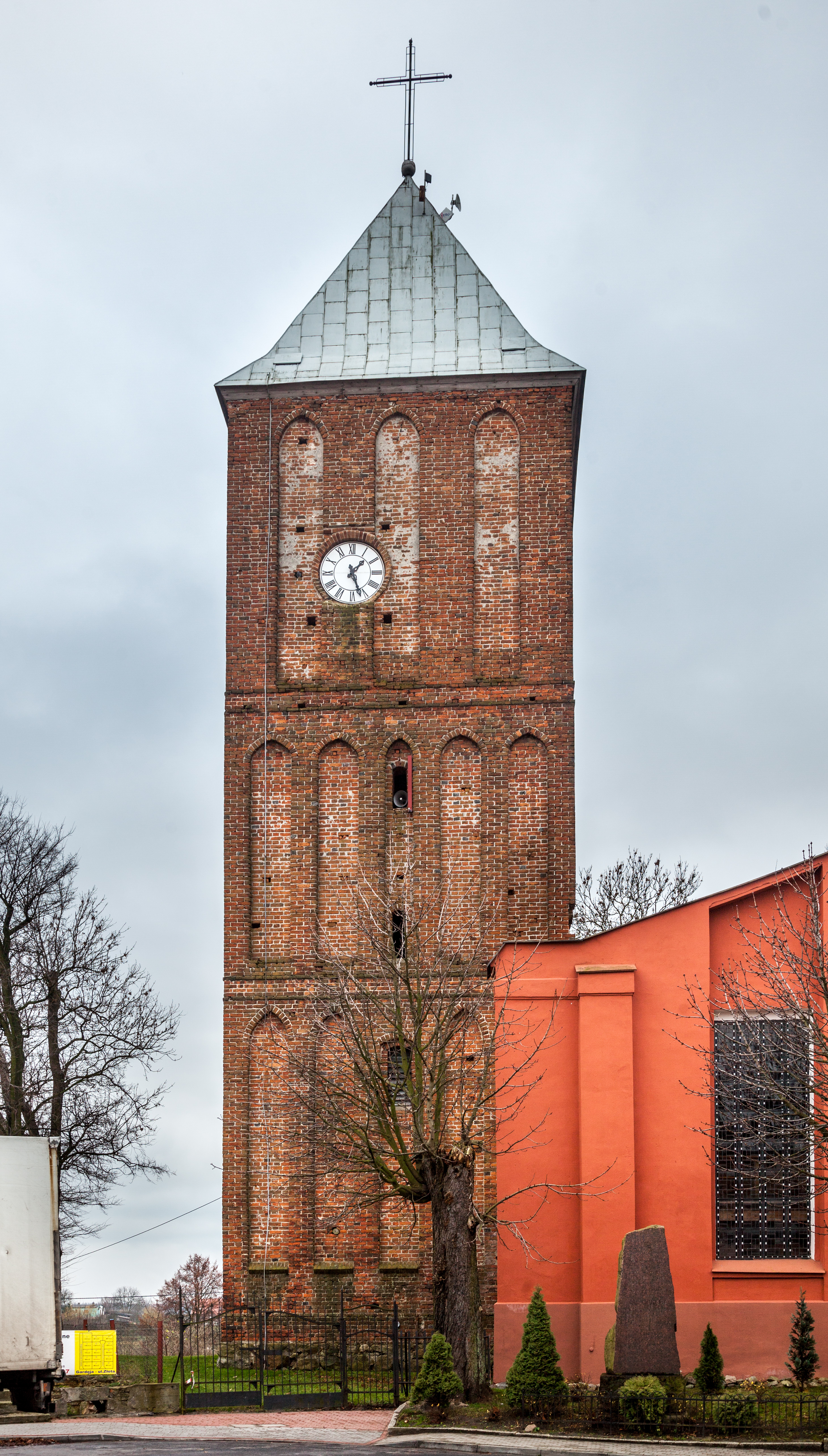
Saint Joseph church

Gardeja is the location of an old medieval pre-Christian stronghold. A Cistercian monastery was founded there in the late 13th century. A little while later, on October 4, 1334, the town was founded in the immediate vicinity of the village by Bertold von Riesenburg, Bishop of Pomesania; it was called Garzanum in the document of foundation. In 1454, King Casimir IV Jagiellon incorporated the region to the Kingdom of Poland upon the request of the anti-Teutonic Prussian Confederation. After the subsequent Thirteen Years' War (1454–1466), it became a part of Poland as a fief held by the Teutonic Knights.

The main road of the settlement broadens toward its southern part to end up in the market place, at the south-eastern edge of which the church is located, probably first built around 1330–40. In 1527 the church became evangelical; its nave has been rebuilt in 1729–31. During the 19th century lectures were held in the church in German as well as in Polish.

After the town had burnt down in 1554, it was re-founded in 1559. From the 18th century it was part of the Kingdom of Prussia, and from 1871 it was part of Germany, within which it formed part of the Kreis Marienwerder in the administrative district of Regierungsbezirk Marienwerder in the province of West Prussia. In 1736 and 1759 it burnt down again, with the exception of a few houses. Around 1789 the town had 104 households, and its citizens lived mainly from agriculture, brewing and handicraft. In the 19th century it was the site of a local court and of a county court. In October and November 1831, various Polish units of the November Uprising, including cavalry and infantry, stopped in the village and its environs on the way to their internment places. On June 12, 1832, the Prussians attacked a group of Polish insurgents who were nonviolently resisting an attempt to send them to the Russian Partition of Poland, and then still deported them, including those wounded.

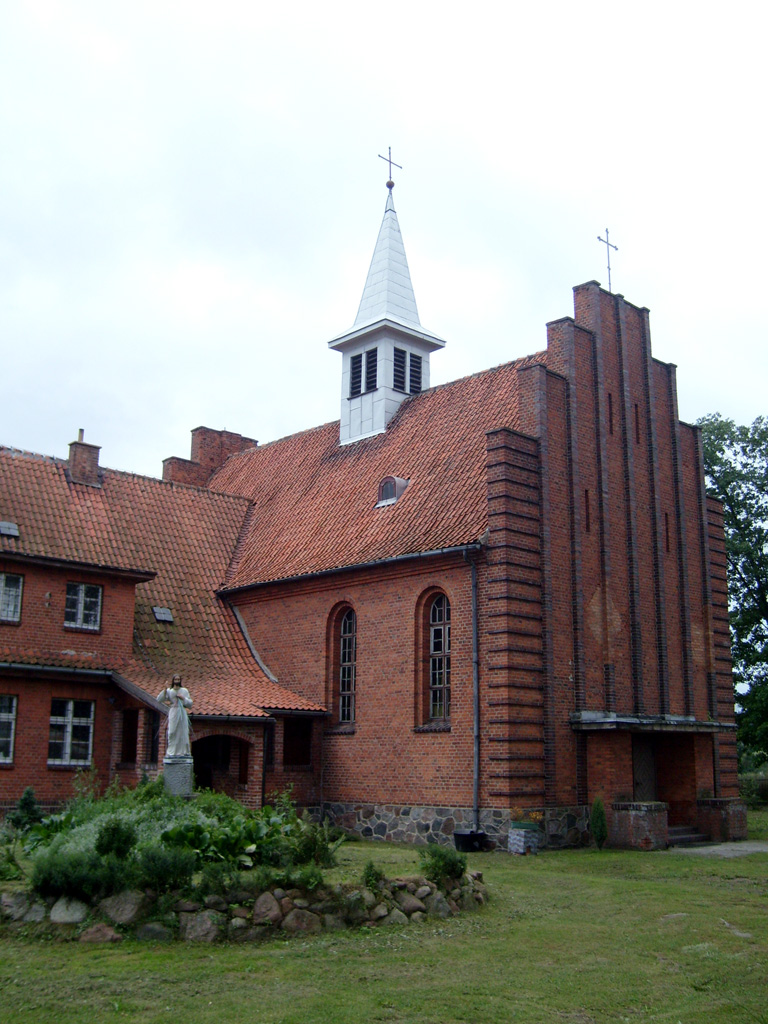
Sacred Heart church

After World War I and the Treaty of Versailles a referendum was held allowing the inhabitants to decide on the future national membership of their town. As a result, it became part of Germany, although the town had to pass on its train station, which was located ten kilometers further south, to reborn independent Poland. It now had become a border town. From 1919 to 1939 it was administratively located in Regierungsbezirk Westpreußen of the province of East Prussia and from October 26, 1939, to 1945 in Regierungsbezirk Marienwerder of the province of Reichsgau Danzig-West Prussia. In 1927 a new train station was built.

During World War II it was captured by the Red Army. After the end of war the town became again part of Poland under its historic Polish name Gardeja. Due to population loss Gardeja lost its town rights.

=== Number of inhabitants by year ===
| Year | Number |
|---|---|
| 1740 | 379 |
| 1788 | 457 |
| 1831 | 900 |
| 1885 | 1,205 |
| 1900 | 1,100 |
| 1905 | 984 |
| 1925 | 1,070 |
| 1933 | 2,062 |
| 1939 | 1,998 |
| 1943 | 2,196 |
| 2006 | 2,500 |

== Administration ==
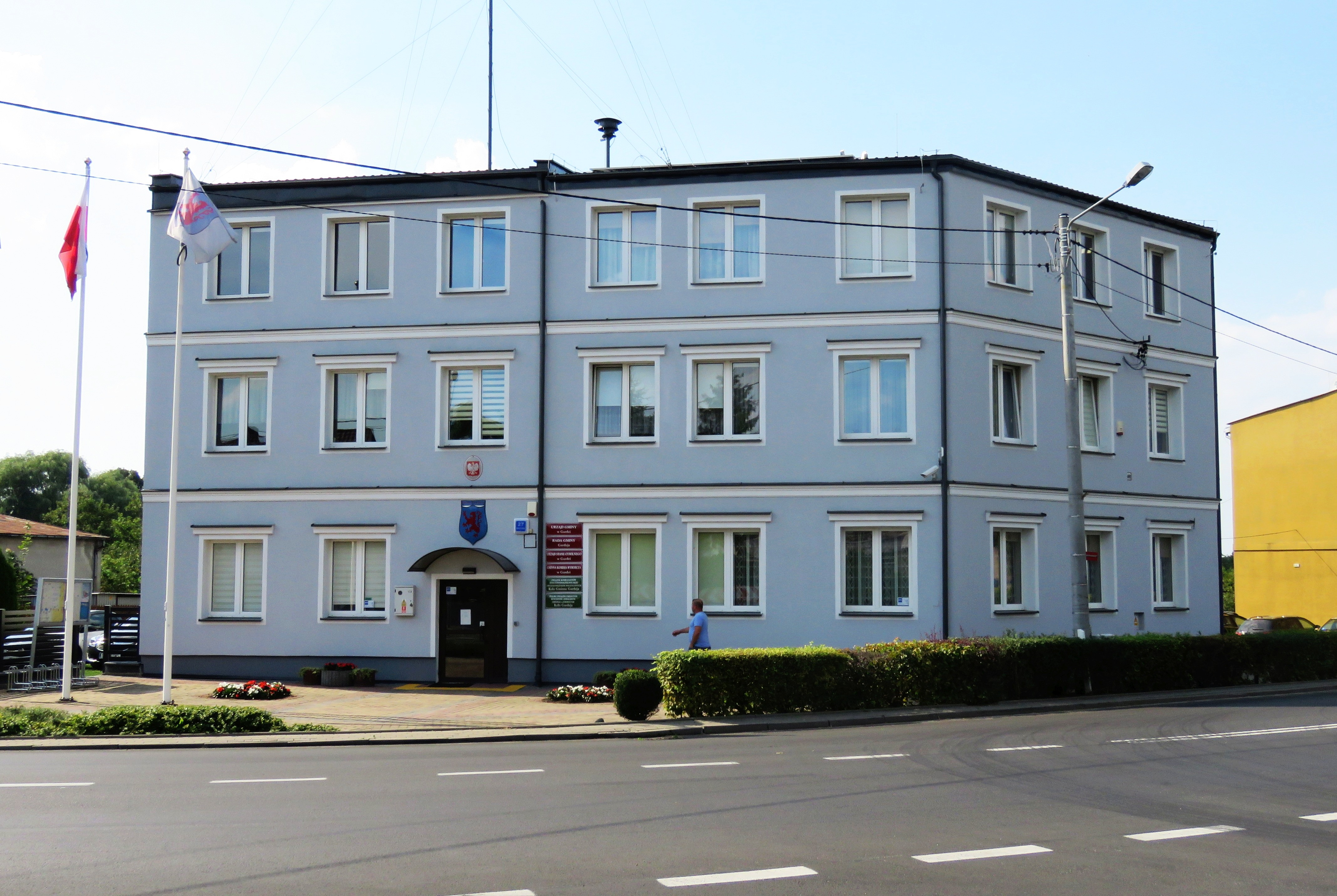
Gmina office

Gardeja is sub-divided into four sołectwos: Gardeja I, II, III and IV.

== Transport ==
Gardeja is located at the intersection of National road 55 and Voivodeship road 523, and there is a train station in the village.

== Sports ==
The local football club is Pogoń Gardeja. It competes in the lower leagues.
