= Powiśle (region) =

Region in Poland

- Geographical region
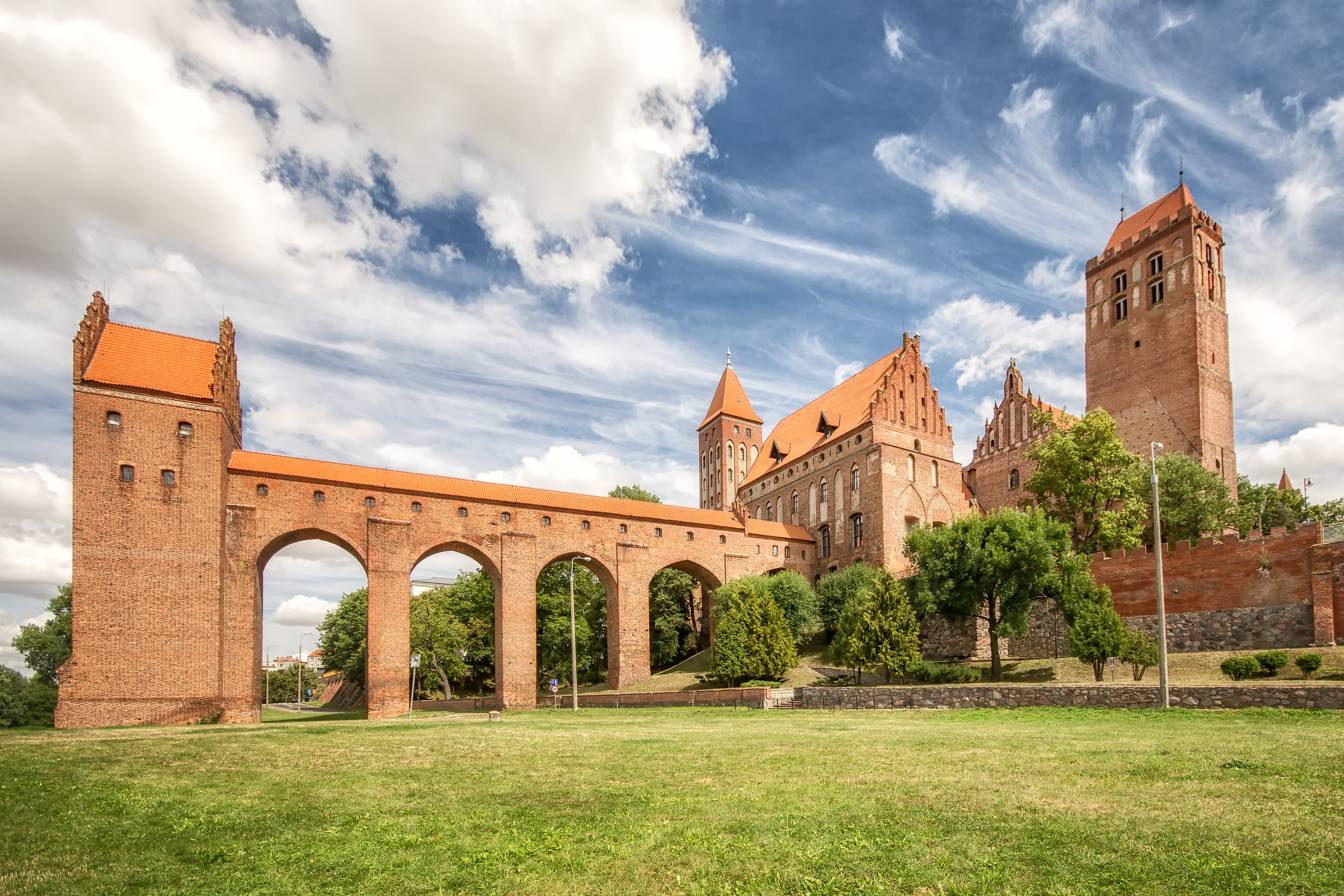
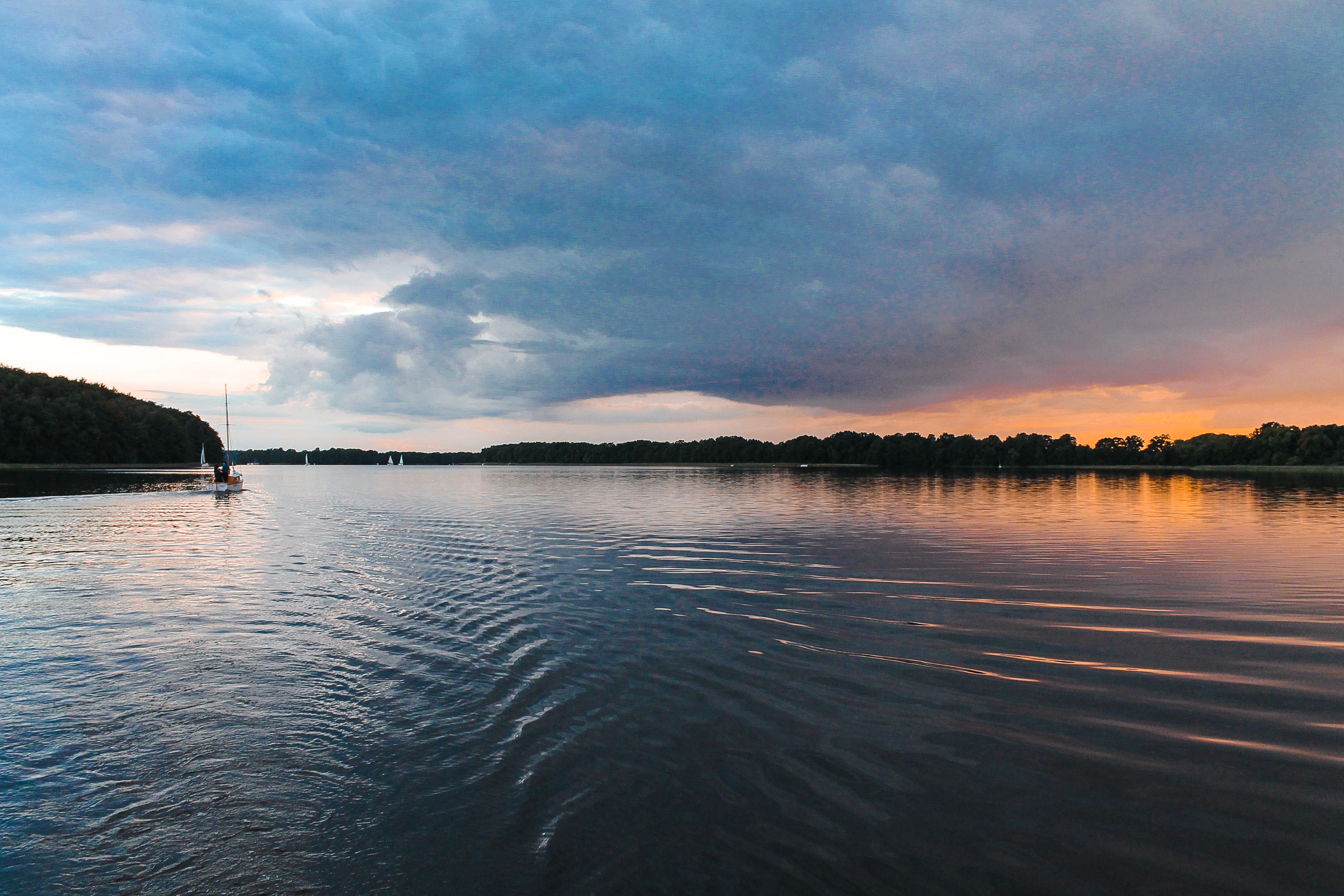
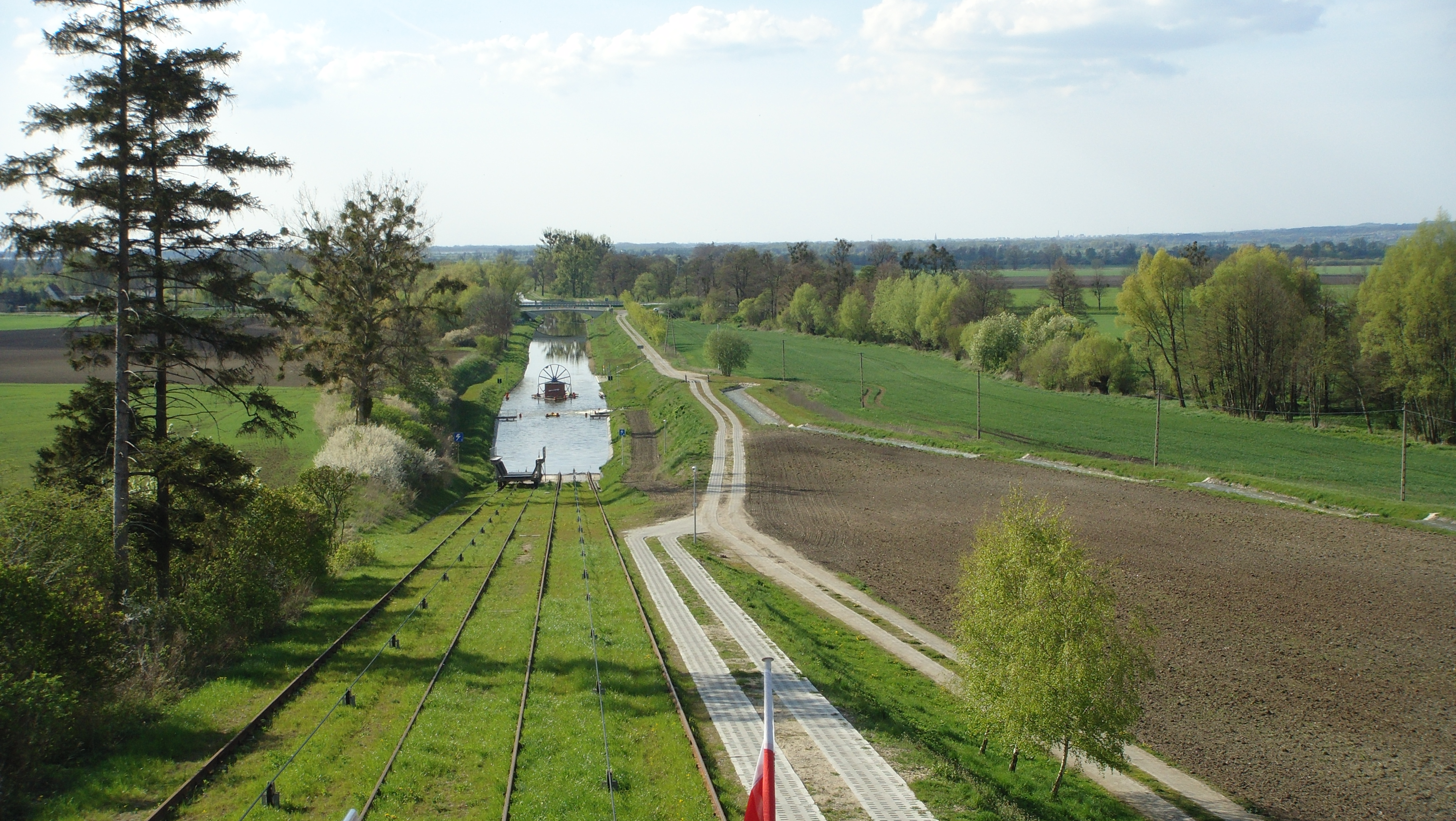
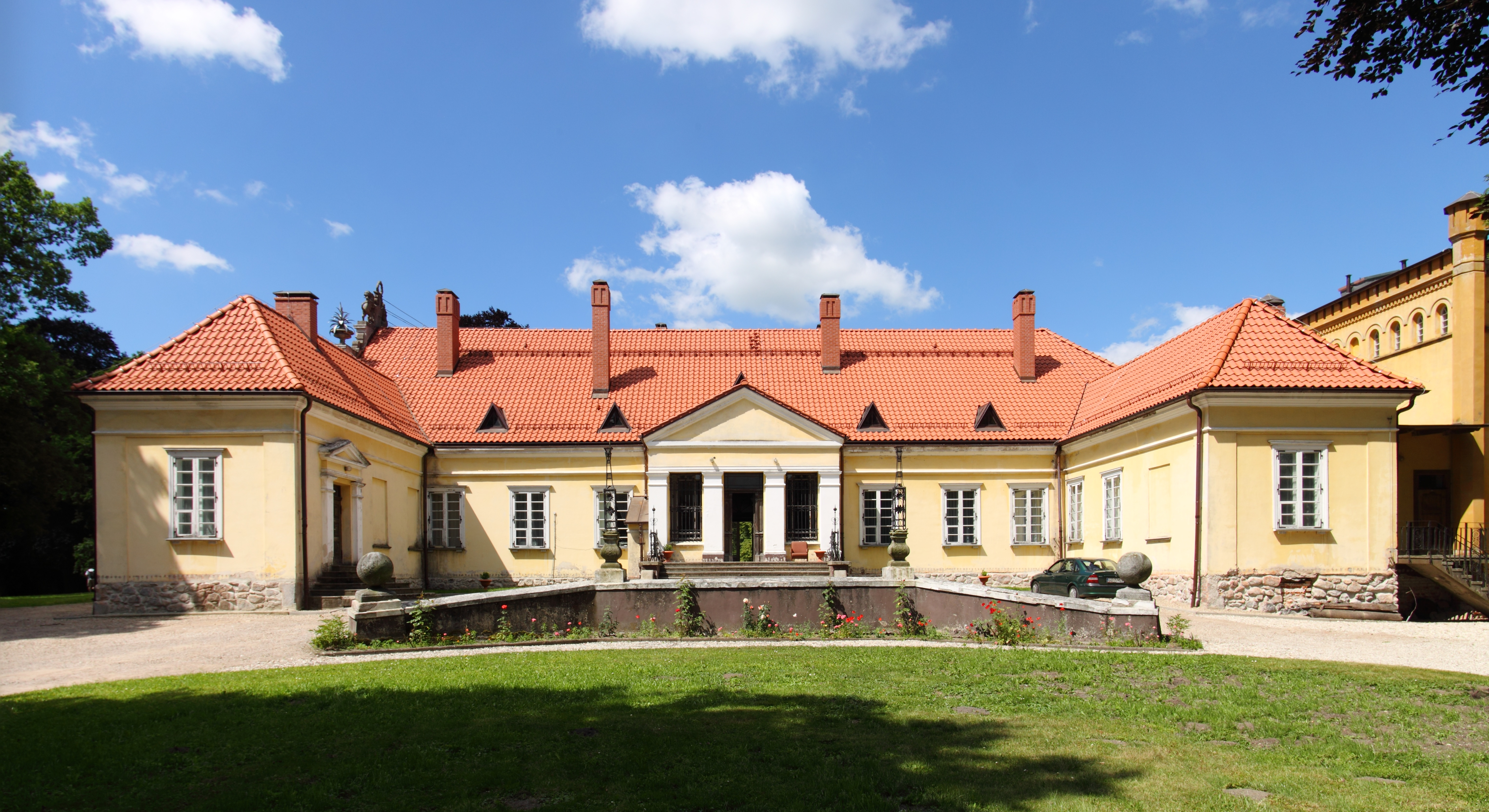
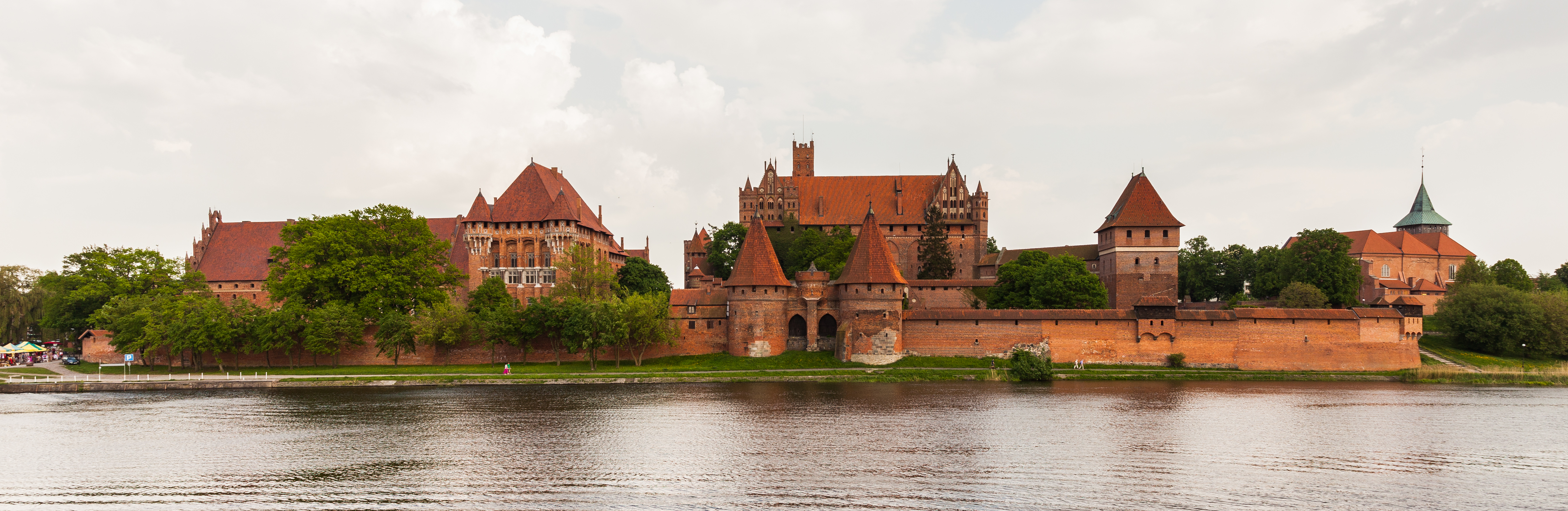
- Kwidzyn Castle Jeziorak Lake Elbląg Canal Waplewo Wielkie Palace Malbork Castle

- Powiśle on the map of Poland
- Country: Poland
- Largest city: Elbląg
- Time zone: UTC+1 (CET)
  - Summer (DST): UTC+2 (CEST)

Powiśle or Dolne Powiśle is a cultural and geographic region in northern Poland, administratively located in the Pomeranian and Warmian-Masurian Voivodeships.

It is named after the Vistula River (Polish: Wisła), referring to the region's location on the right bank of the river, near its delta.

The largest cities and towns of Powiśle are Elbląg, Kwidzyn, Malbork and Iława.

2007 was designated the "Year of Powiśle" (Rok Powiśla), with various festivities held in the region, including musical, athletic, theatrical and historical re-enactments.

Powiśle is bordered by Warmia and Masuria in the east, by the Chełmno Land in the south, and by Pomerania in the west.

== Sights ==
- Malbork Castle in Malbork, UNESCO World Heritage Site and Historic Monument of Poland
- Kwidzyn Castle and Co-Cathedral complex in Kwidzyn, Historic Monument of Poland
- Elbląg Canal, partly located in Masuria, Historic Monument of Poland, with Lake Ruda Woda as its longest natural section
- Sierakowski Palace in Waplewo Wielkie, seat of the Museum of Noble Tradition (Muzeum Tradycji Szlacheckiej), branch of the National Museum in Gdańsk
- Archaeological and Historical Museum in Elbląg
- Elbląg Upland Landscape Park and Iława Lake District Landscape Park with Jeziorak, the longest and sixth largest lake in Poland
- Bażyński Oak in Kadyny, over 700-year-old oak and natural monument of Poland, one of the oldest and thickest trees in Poland

== Cuisine ==
Powiśle is the place of cultivation of apples, pears and plums. The Powiśle plum (powiślańska śliwka) is used to make powidła, vinegar, and the Nebrowianka nalewka, all officially recognized by the Ministry of Agriculture and Rural Development of Poland as traditional regional products. Other traditional foods include the Czernin apple cultivated in Czernin, Piekło marzipan hearts, a local cookie, decorated with chocolate or jelly, and the Piekło kiełbasa with black mustard seed, a local type of kiełbasa, produced in Piekło.

== Sports ==
The most popular sports in Powiśle are football, handball and basketball. The top teams are men's handball team MMTS Kwidzyn and women's handball team Start Elbląg, both playing in the top Polish divisions (as of 2023–24).

== Curiosities ==
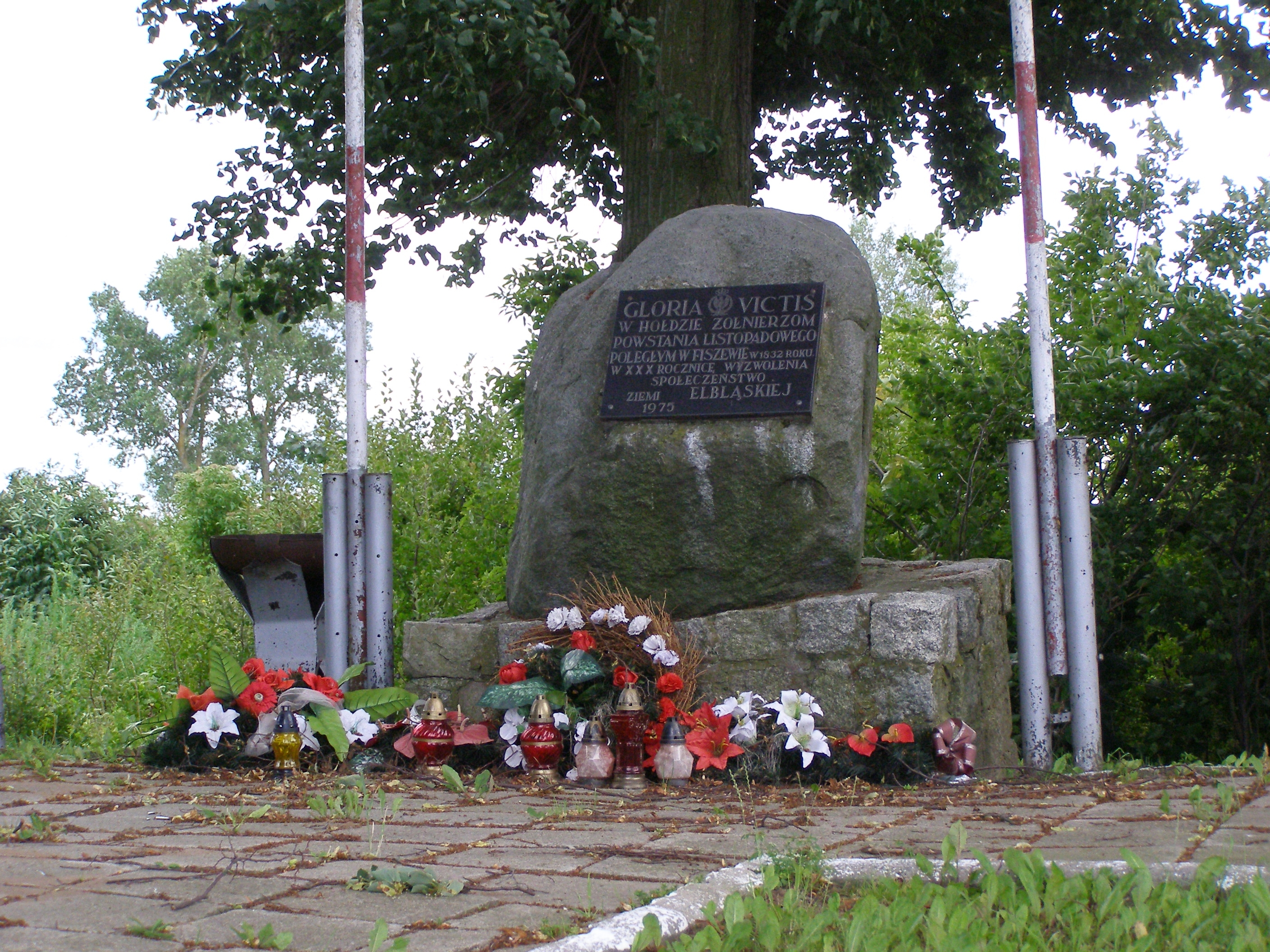
Monument to Polish insurgents massacred by the Prussians in Fiszewo in 1832

- Elbląg as one of the major cities of the Kingdom of Poland enjoyed voting rights during the royal election period.
- There is a Commonwealth War Graves Commission cemetery in Malbork at the site of the former Stalag XX-B German prisoner-of-war camp from World War II, which held Polish, British, French, Belgian, Serbian, Australian, New Zealand, Canadian and other Allied POWs.
- Elbląg, Malbork, Sztum, Dzierzgoń and Tolkmicko are former royal cities of the Kingdom of Poland.
- The village of Stary Targ was the place of signing of a truce, which ended the Polish–Swedish War of 1626–1629. There is a memorial in the village.
- The village of Fiszewo was the site of a massacre of Polish insurgents committed by the Prussians in 1832, commemorated with a monument and an annual rally.
- The town of Pasłęk is the first place where Dutch immigrants settled in present-day Poland in 1297.
- The towns of Kisielice and Morąg are members of Cittaslow.
