= Marek Szulen =

Polish composer (born 1975)

Marek 'mRqS' Szulen (born 28 August 1975) is a Polish composer of electronic music and Director of Festival Of Electronic Music "KOMP" in Kwidzyn, Poland. He is currently living and recording in the Netherlands.

== Discography ==
- "Ankaria" - rel. 1999
- "Creation - Universal Consciousness" - rel. 2002 r. dedicated to human beings from planet Erra in Pleiades star cluster

== See also ==
- New-age music
- Kayanis
- Jean Michel Jarre
