= Kiani =

Kiani may refer to:

- Kiani (surname)
- Kiani, a supporting character of Fathom (comics)
- Kiani Crown, a coronation crown used during the Qajar dynasty (1796–1925)
- Kyani, a settlement in Didymoteicho, Greece
