= Kayani =

Kayani or Kiani or Kayanis may refer to:

== People ==
- Kayanis (musician) (fl. from 1988), Polish musician and composer
- Ashfaq Parvez Kayani (born 1952), Pakistani army general
- M. R. Kayani (1902–1962), Pakistani jurist
- Mohsin Akhtar Kayani (born 1970), Pakistani jurist

== Other uses ==
- Kayanian dynasty, a legendary dynasty of Persian/Iranian tradition and folklore

== See also ==
- Kiani
- Kayani Ghakar, a tribe in Pakistan
