= Kwidzyn =

Town in Pomeranian Voivodeship, Poland

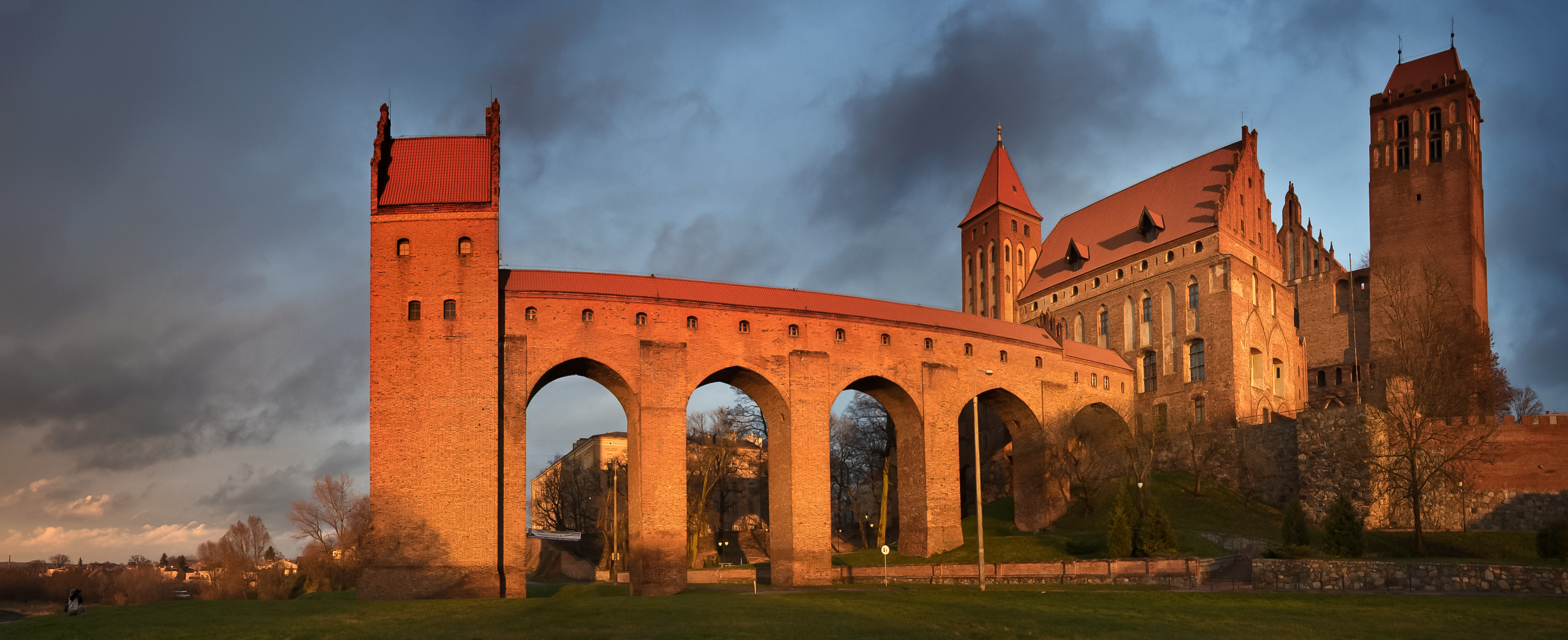
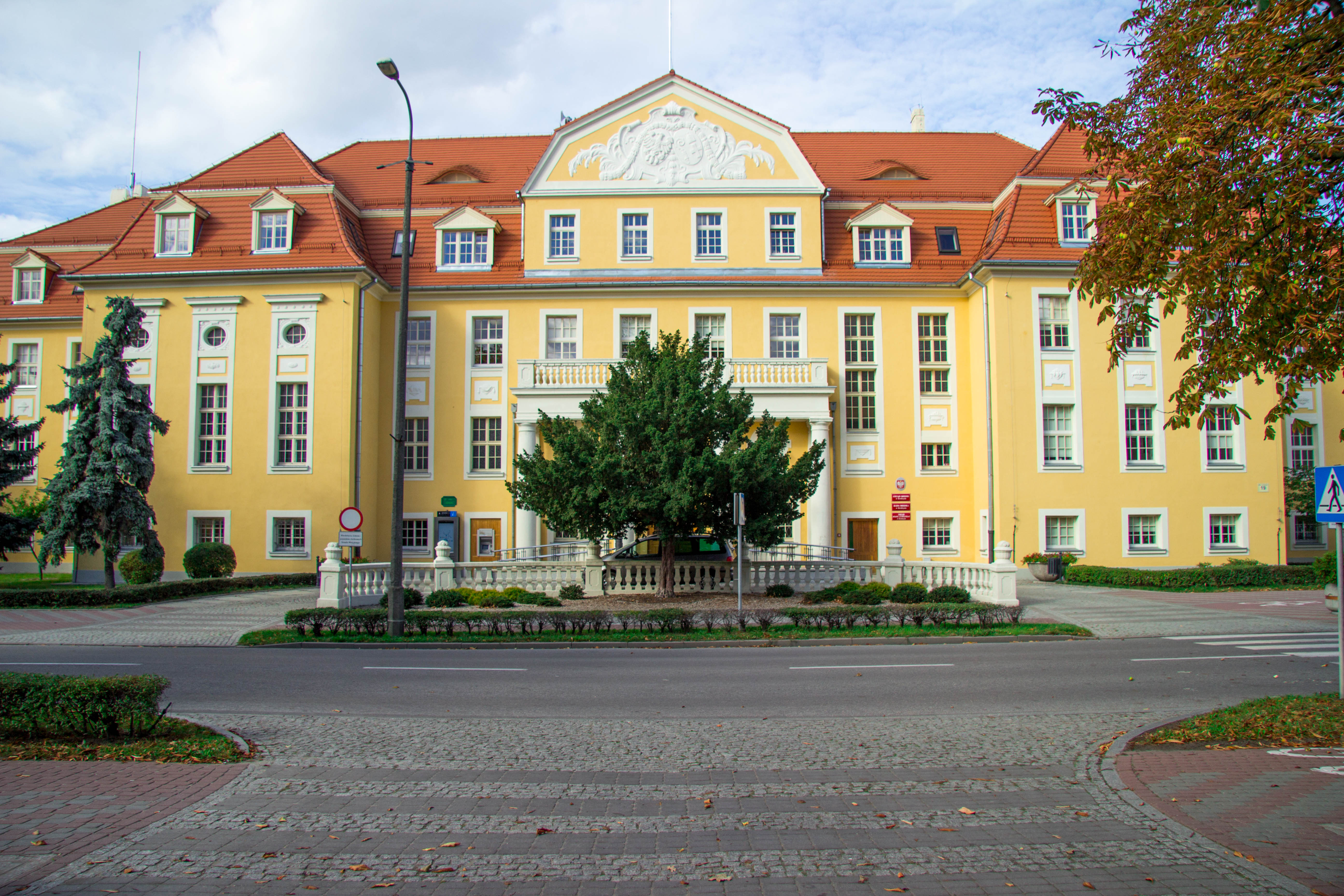
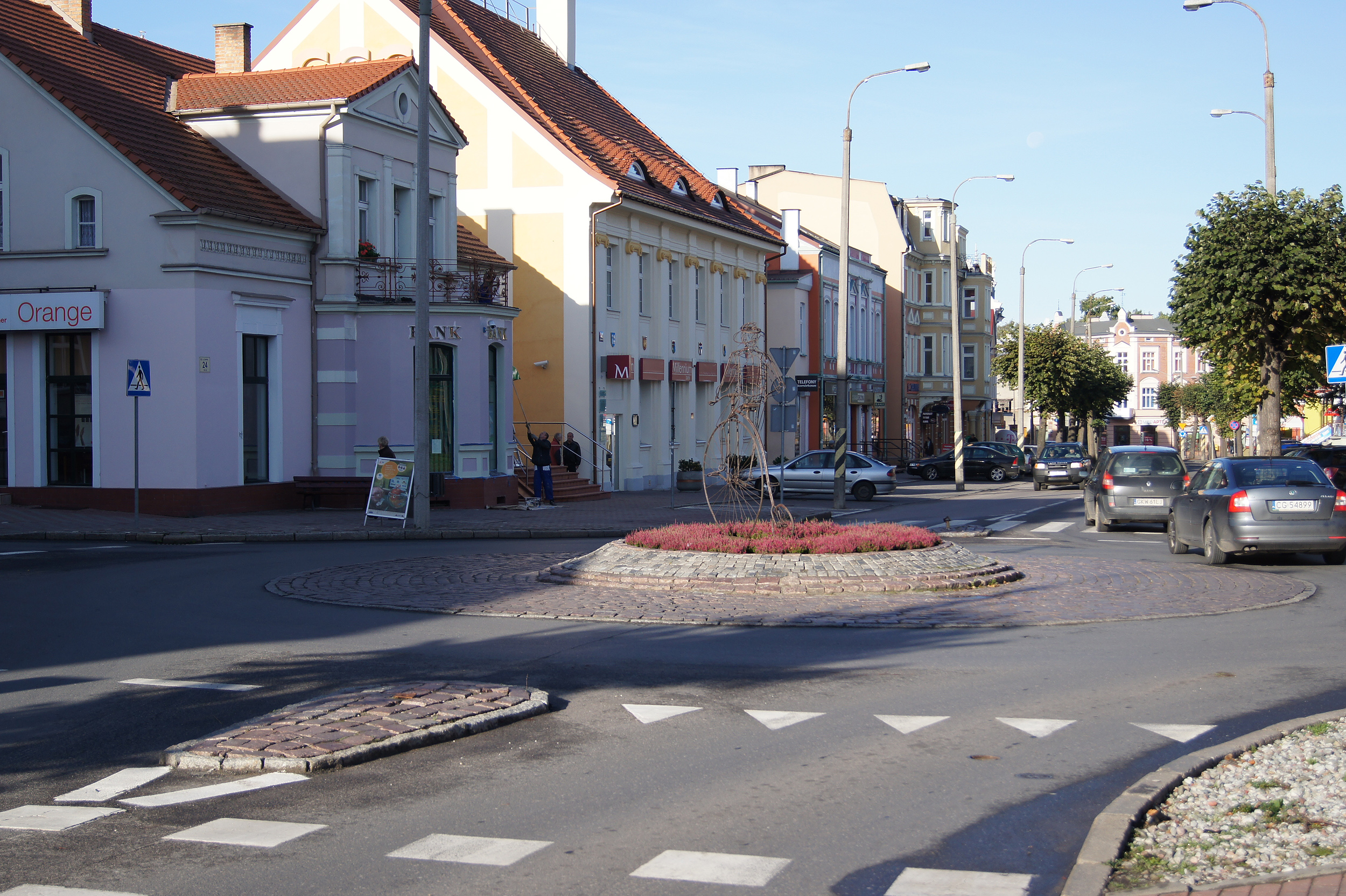
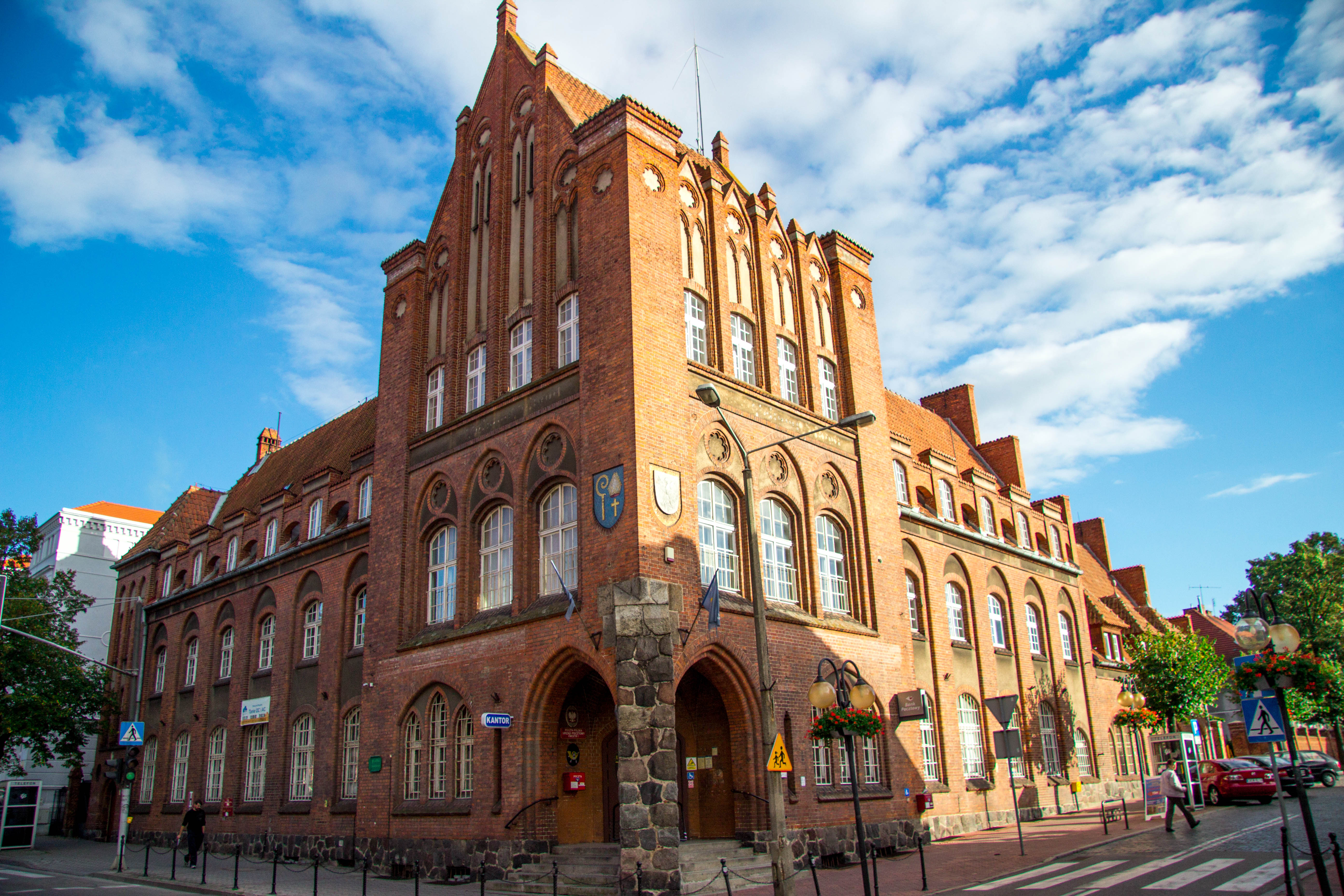
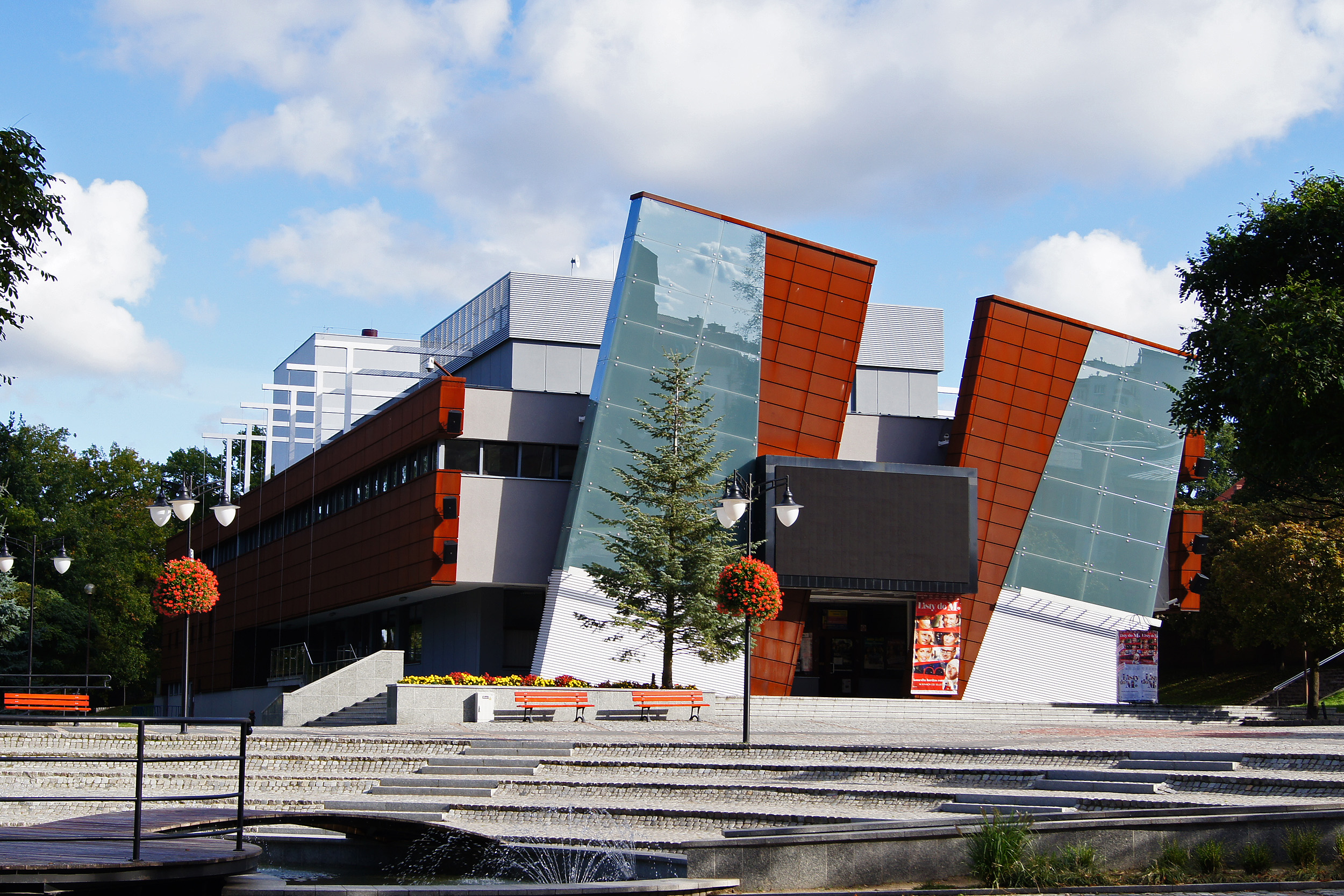
- Kwidzyn Castle Town hall Chopin Street Main post office Cinema and theater

- Flag Coat of arms

- Location within Poland
- Coordinates: 53°44′9″N 18°55′51″E
- Country: Poland
- Voivodeship: Pomeranian
- County: Kwidzyn
- Gmina: Kwidzyn (urban gmina)
- Established: 11th century
- Town rights: 1233

Government
  - Mayor: Sebastian Kasztelan

Area
  - Total: 21.82 km^{2} (8.42 sq mi)
- Elevation: 42 m (138 ft)

Population (2024)
  - Total: 36,731
  - Density: 1,683/km^{2} (4,360/sq mi)
- Time zone: UTC+1 (CET)
  - Summer (DST): UTC+2 (CEST)
- Postal code: 82-500
- Area code: +48 55
- Vehicle registration: GKW
- Website: https://www.kwidzyn.pl

Kwidzyn (Polish pronunciation: [ˈkfʲid͡zɨn]; German: Marienwerder [maˌʁiːənˈvɛʁdɐ]) (Note: Other names: Latin: Quedin; Old Prussian: Kwēdina) is a town in northern Poland on the Liwa River. With a population of 36,731, it is the capital of Kwidzyn County in the Pomeranian Voivodeship.

== Geography ==
Kwidzyn is located on the Liwa River, some 5 kilometres (3.1 miles) east of the Vistula river, approximately 70 km (43 mi) south of Gdańsk and 145 km (90 mi) southwest of Kaliningrad. It is part of the region of Powiśle.

== History ==
=== Early history ===
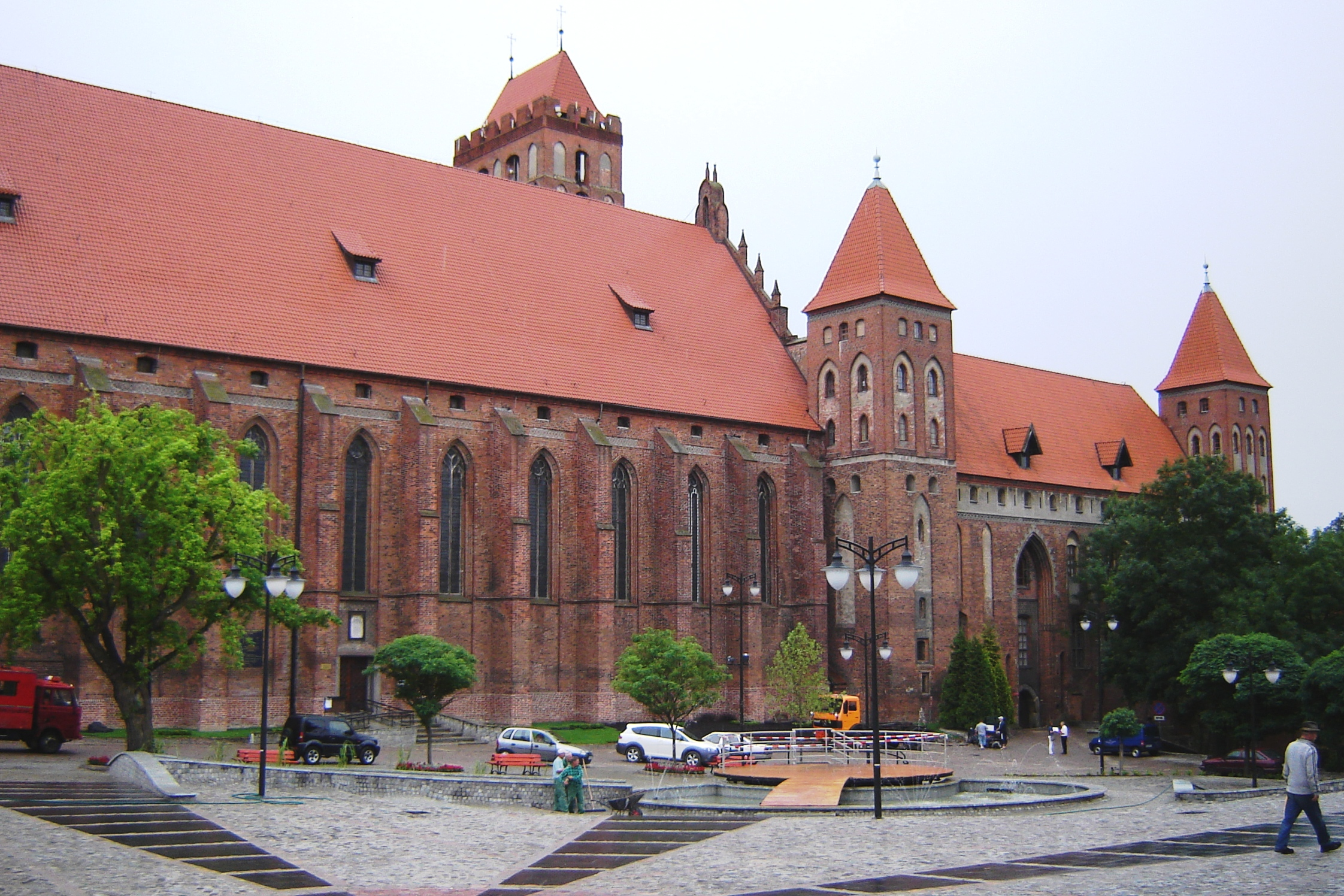
Kwidzyn Castle and Cathedral in 2010

The Pomesanian settlement called Kwedis existed in the 11th century. In 1232, the Teutonic Knights built the castle and established the town of Marienwerder (now Kwidzyn) the following year. In 1243, the Bishopric of Pomesania received both the town and castle from the Teutonic Order as fiefs, and the settlement became the seat of the Bishops of Pomesania within Prussia. The town was populated by artisans and traders, originating from towns in the northern parts of the Holy Roman Empire. A Teutonic knight, Werner von Orseln, was murdered in Marienburg (Malbork) in 1330. He was among the first to be buried in the newly erected cathedral of the town.

St. Dorothea of Montau lived in Marienwerder from 1391 until her death in 1394; future pilgrims visiting her shrine would contribute to the flourishing economy.

The Prussian Confederation, which opposed Teutonic rule, was founded in the town on March 14, 1440. The town itself joined the organization on 17 April 1440. Upon the request of the organization in 1454 Polish King Casimir IV Jagiellon incorporated the region and town to the Kingdom of Poland, and the Thirteen Years' War broke out. In 1466, after the defeat of the Teutonic Knights in the war, the town became part of Poland as a fief held by the Teutonic Knights. In 1525, the Teutonic state was transformed into a secular and Lutheran duchy under the last Grand Master of the Teutonic Order Albert, a political foundation only possible with the consent of the Polish King Sigismund I the Old. The town was visited by Polish Kings Sigismund II Augustus in 1552 and Stephen Báthory in 1576. In 1618 the ducal rights were inherited by the Brandenburg branch of the House of Hohenzollern, remaining under Polish suzerainty. In 1657 the Brandenburg dukes severed ties with the Polish crown and in 1701 elevated their realm to the sovereign Kingdom of Prussia. During the War of the Polish Succession, Polish King Stanisław Leszczyński stayed in the town in July 1734.

=== Late modern period ===
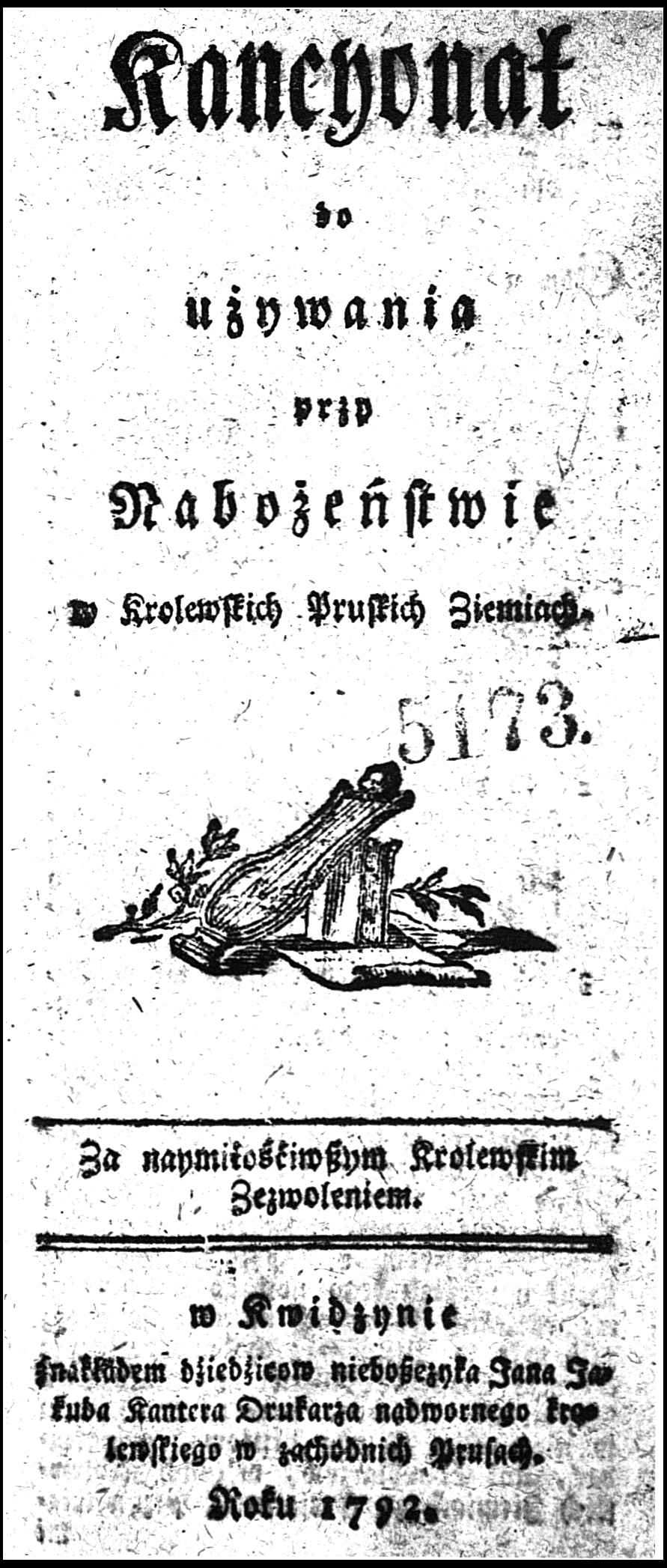
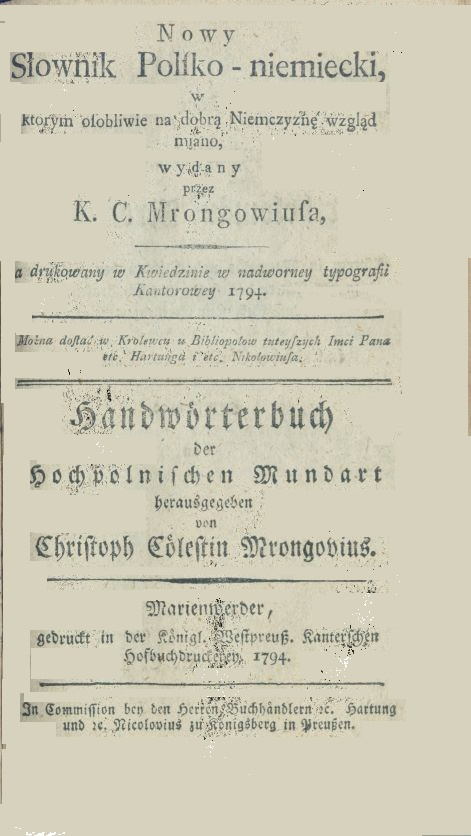
Examples of historic Polish publications from Kwidzyn: a hymnal from 1792 and Polish-German dictionary by Mrongovius from 1794

In 1765 Prussia established a customs chamber for Polish products floated down the Vistula to Polish Baltic ports. The town of Marienwerder meanwhile had become the capital of the District of Marienwerder. In 1772, the Marienwerder district was integrated into the newly established Prussian Province of West Prussia, which consisted mostly of territories annexed in the First Partition of Poland. Separate Polish and German preachers were still appointed at the local church. In November 1831, several Polish cavalry units of the November Uprising stopped in the town on the way to their internment places.

By the enlargement of its administrative functions, the population of the town started to grow and in 1885, it numbered 8,079. This population was composed mostly of Lutheran inhabitants, many of whom were engaged in trades connected with the manufacturing of sugar, vinegar and brewing as well as dairy farming, fruit growing and the industrial construction of machines. In 1910, Marienwerder had a population of 12,983 of which 12,408 (95.6%) were German-speaking and 346 (2.7%) were Polish-speaking.

=== Interbellum and World War II ===
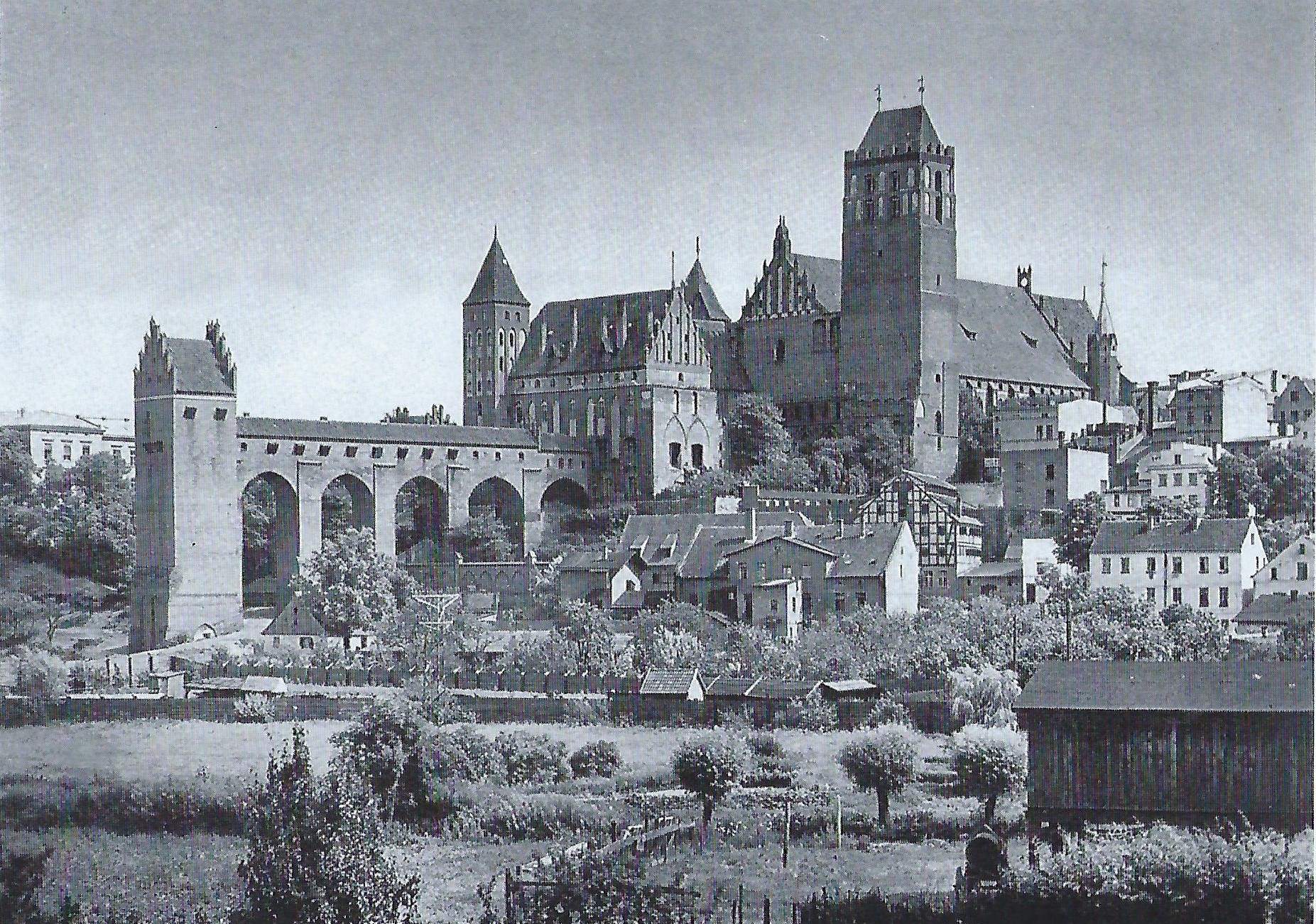
1920s view of the castle and cathedral

As a result of the Treaty of Versailles after World War I, the district of Marienwerder was divided. The parts west of the Vistula were incorporated into the Polish Second Republic, which had just regained its independence. The parts east of the Vistula, to which the town of Marienwerder belonged, was to take part in the East Prussian plebiscite, which was organized under the control of the League of Nations. The Inter-Allied Commission with nearly 2,000 troops often favored the Germans, and its services towards Poles were often delayed and limited, while the administration remained under German control. The town was home to the Polish Warmian Plebiscite Committee and the Committee for Polish Affairs, which, however, had to operate partly secretly. On May 16, 1920, the largest Polish plebiscite demonstration in Powiśle took place in the town, and Poles had to organize defenses against attacks by German militias. According to Polish sources there was German electoral fraud. In Marienwerder 7,811 votes were given to remain in East Prussia, and therefore Germany, and 362 for Poland. Afterwards, anti-Polish terror intensified.

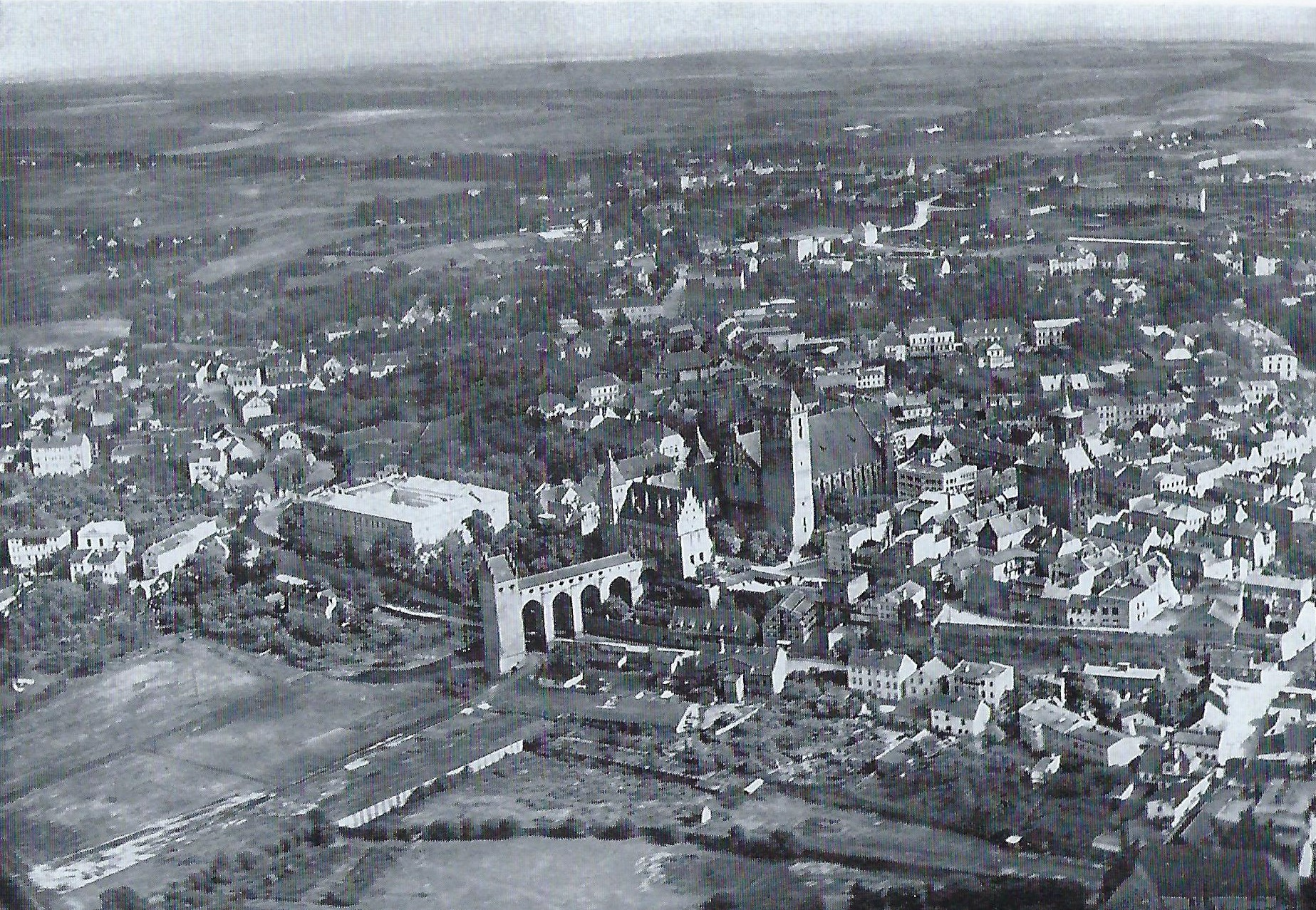
Aerial view of the town in the 1920s

According to the Geneva Conventions, the Polish community was entitled to its own schools, and from 1934 local Poles strove to establish a Polish school. The Germans blocked the establishment of the school, and Polish organizations filed 100 complaints to the German administration before the Polish private gymnasium was finally established on November 10, 1937. Local German press incited the Germans against the Polish school, and in 1938 a fourteen-year-old boy was shot at the school playground, which the German police ignored, and the shooter was not caught. The Germans, especially the Hitler Youth, repeatedly harassed and attacked Polish students and devastated the school. It was forcibly closed down on August 25, 1939. The German police surrounded the Polish school and arrested its principal Władysław Gębik, 13 teachers, other staff and 162 students, who were imprisoned in Tapiau (today Gvardeysk), Strobjehnen (Kulikovo) and Grünhoff (Roshchino). Later on, students under the age of 18 were released, older students were forcibly conscripted into the Wehrmacht, while teachers and staff were deported to concentration camps, where most of them were murdered. The head of the local Polish Bank Ludowy was also arrested, and the local Polish consulate was cut off from telephone lines, nevertheless the state radio in Poland still provided information regarding the attack on the Polish school on the same day.

Nazi Germany co-formed the Einsatzgruppe V in the town, which then entered several Polish cities, including Grudziądz, Ciechanów, Łomża and Siedlce, to commit various atrocities against Poles during the German invasion of Poland, which started World War II. Many Poles expelled from German-occupied Poland were deported to forced labour in the town's vicinity. The Germans also operated a subcamp of the Stutthof concentration camp in the town. One of the main contact points of the intelligence of the Pomeranian District of the Union of Armed Struggle and Home Army was based in the town. On 21 January at approximately 16:00, a surprising order came to evacuvate the civilians westwards towards Chojnice. When the Red Army invaded East Prussia at least 95% of the citizens of Marienwerder were speaking German as their mother tongue, and therefore they feared the atrocities committed to the German population. A majority of them left the city but not all arrived save territory alive. Those which stayed were robbed, raped and eventually murdered by the Red Army. On 30 January the town was captured by the Red Army. The Red Army established a war hospital in the town for 20,000 people. The town center was burned and pillaged by Soviet soldiers. In the course of 1945 the city was emptied of the last German inhabitants. Meanwhile, large parts of the inner city were sacked. Since then, Polish newcomers from Poland and Lithuania repopulated the town and its environments. The Lutheran ecclesiastical buildings were handed over to the Catholic Church. After World War II, the town became again part of Poland under the terms of the Potsdam Agreement, although with a Soviet-installed communist regime, which stayed in power until the 1980s.

=== Post-war period ===
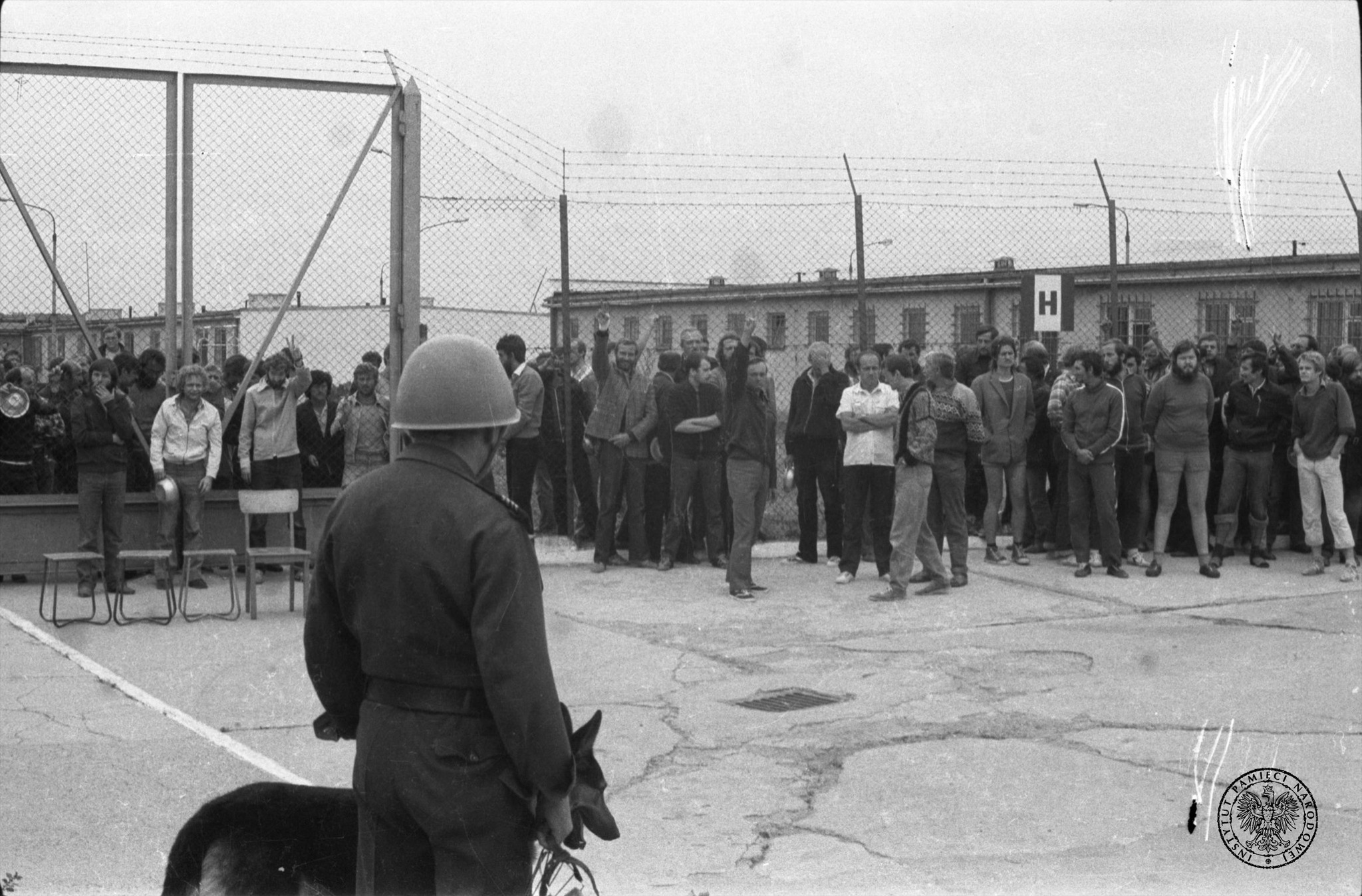
1982 protest of interned anti-communist oppositionists

In the following years, the Polish anti-communist resistance was active in Kwidzyn, including the nationwide Home Army and Armed Forces Delegation for Poland, and local organisations Organizacja Młodzieży Demokratycznej Katolickiej (Catholic Democratic Youth Organization), Wolna Polska Niepodległa (Free Independent Poland) and Konfederacja Ruch Oporu (Confederation of the Resistance Movement), the latter also active in Elbląg.

From 1975 to 1998, it was administratively located in the Elbląg Voivodeship. In 1982, the communists brutally crushed the protest of interned anti-communist oppositionists.

== Demographics ==
Historical population

Year	Pop.	±%
1400 (est.)	700	—
1572 (est.)	700	+0.0%
1782	3,156	+350.9%
1783	3,297	+4.5%
1816	4,782	+45.0%
1831	5,060	+5.8%
1843	5,989	+18.4%

Year	Pop.	±%
1875	7,580	+26.6%
1880	8,238	+8.7%
1890	8,552	+3.8%
1900	9,686	+13.3%
1905	11,819	+22.0%
1925	13,721	+16.1%
1930	13,860	+1.0%

Year	Pop.	±%
1933	15,548	+12.2%
1939	19,723	+26.9%
1950	13,361	−32.3%
1960	20,197	+51.2%
2010	38,296	+89.6%

== Points of interest ==
The main landmark is the Kwidzyn Castle, a 14th-century Brick Gothic Ordensburg castle and cathedral complex of the Pomesanian Cathedral Chapter, which now houses a museum. It is listed as a Historic Monument of Poland. The adjacent co-cathedral of St. John the Evangelist was built between 1343 and 1384, and serves as a co-cathedral of the Roman Catholic Diocese of Elbląg. It contains the tombs of three Grand Masters of the Teutonic Knights as well as numerous bishops. A bridge connects the castle to a sewer tower which was once situated on a river that has since dried up.

Other sights include the Appellate Court for Kwidzyn County, the town hall, the Holy Trinity church, the Saint Padre Pio chapel, various government buildings and old townhouses.

== Economy ==
Kwidzyn has one of Poland's largest pulp mills. Established in 1971 as the state-owned Zakłady Celulozowo-Papiernicze, it was privatized and sold to International Paper in 1992. Since 2021, it has been operated by Mayr-Melnhof. The second biggest employer is Jabil, an electronics manufacturing services company. There is also a branch of Powisla University.

== Sports ==
The town's main sports clubs are:

- MMTS Kwidzyn, handball club which plays in the Polish Superliga (top division; as of 2022), runners-up in season 2009–10
- Basket Kwidzyn, basketball club which plays in the lower leagues, but played in the Polish Basketball League (top division) in the past
- Rodło Kwidzyn, football club which plays in the lower leagues

The city has lower average crime and unemployment rates when compared with national averages. These lower rates are attributed to youth sports programs, namely MMTS Kwidzyn and MTS Basket Kwidzyn.

== Transport ==
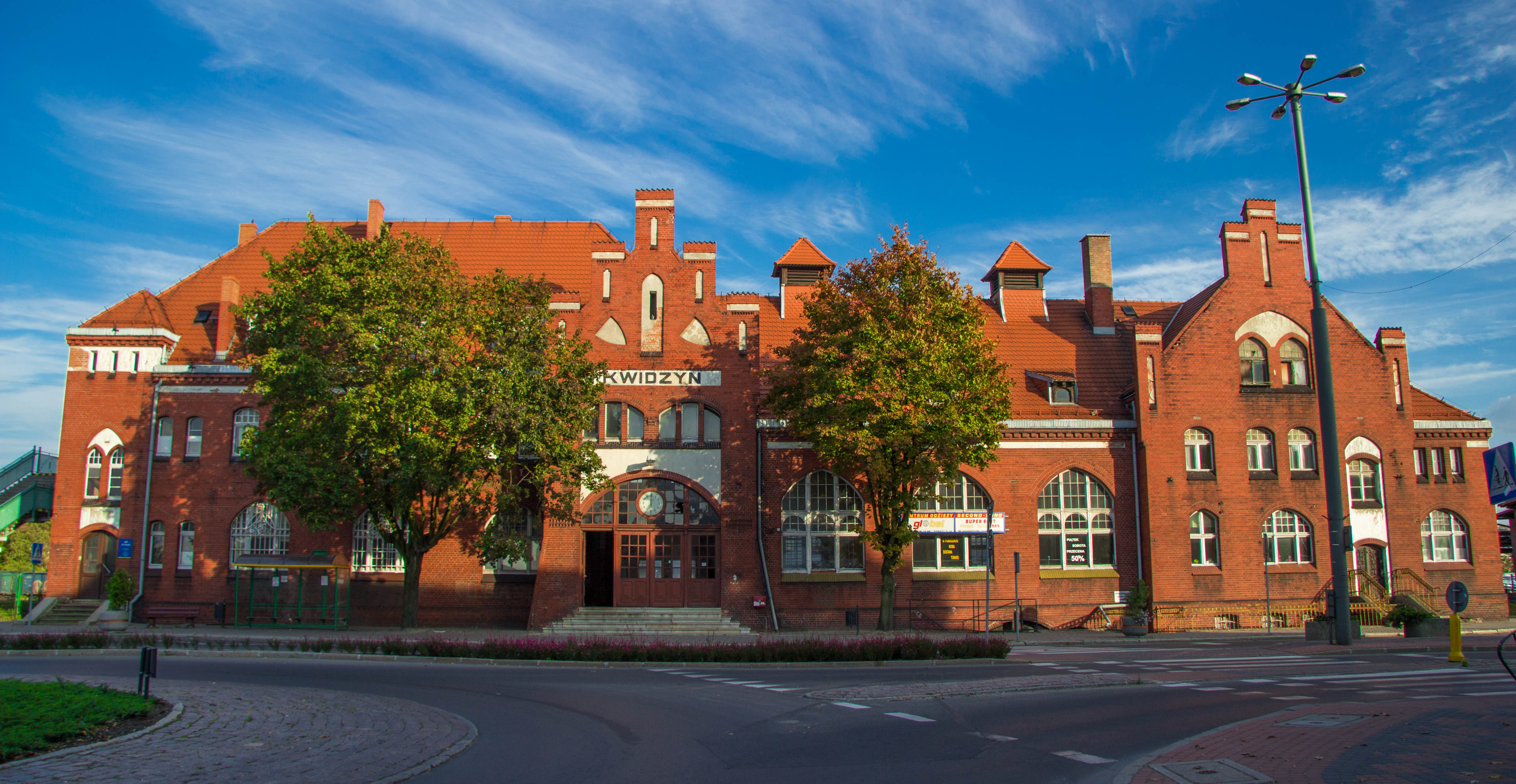
Railway station

The intersections of Polish national roads 55 and 90, voivodeship roads 521 and 532, and voivodeship roads 518 and 588, are located either in Kwidzyn or just outside of the town limits.

The city's railway station serves regional connections to nearby cities, including Malbork, Grudziądz, Gardeja. It is operated mainly by Polregio.

== Notable people ==
- Dorothea of Montau (1347–1394), hermitess and visionary of 14th century Germany, canonized in 1976.
- Paul Speratus (1484–1551), Catholic priest who became a Protestant preacher, reformer and hymn-writer
- Eduard Heinrich von Flottwell (1786–1865), Prussian Staatsminister and Regierungspräsident of Marienwerder in 1825
- Hans Adolf Erdmann von Auerswald (1792–1848), Prussian general and politician
- Karl Ludwig Hencke (1793–1866 in Marienwerder), amateur astronomer and discoverer of minor planets
- Rudolf von Auerswald (1795–1866), Prime Minister of Prussia
- Carl Julius Meyer von Klinggräff (1809–1879), German botanist
- Hermann von Dechend (1814–1890), first President of the Reichsbank
- Heinrich Julian Schmidt (1818–1886), German journalist and historian of literature
- Rudolf Heidenhain (1834–1897), German physiologist
- Gustav Cohn (1840–1919), German economist, particularly re. public finance
- Kurt Rosenfeld (1877–1943), lawyer and politician
- Józef Krasnowolski (1879–1939), Polish painter
- Fritz Goerdeler (1886–1945), German jurist and resistance fighter; mayor 1920–33
- Joachim Witthöft (1887–1966), general
- Kurt-Jürgen Freiherr von Lützow (1892–1961), general
- Ida Siekmann (1902–1961) nurse, first victim of Berlin Wall
- Ernst Schiffner (1903–1980), German actor and director
- Ernst Tillich (1910–1985), German theologian
- Bernard Friese (1927–2010), co-founder of Gilbern cars
- Hardy Rodenstock (1941–2018), music publisher and manager; dealer in old and rare wine
- Maciej Aksler (1947–2006), Polish test pilot
- Wiesław Hartman (1950–2021), Polish show jumping equestrian, silver medallist in the 1980 Summer Olympics
- Wojciech Belon (1952–1985), Polish poet, songwriter and folksinger
- Izabela Tomaszewska (1955–2010), Polish government official and archeologist
- Tomasz Piotr Nowak (born 1956), Polish politician
- Jacek Borcuch (born 1970), Polish actor and film director
- Marek Szulen (born 1975), Polish composer of electronic music, lives in the Netherlands
- Maciej Silski (born 1976), Polish singer
- Patryk Rombel (born 1983), Polish handball coach, currently coaching the Polish national team

== Gallery ==
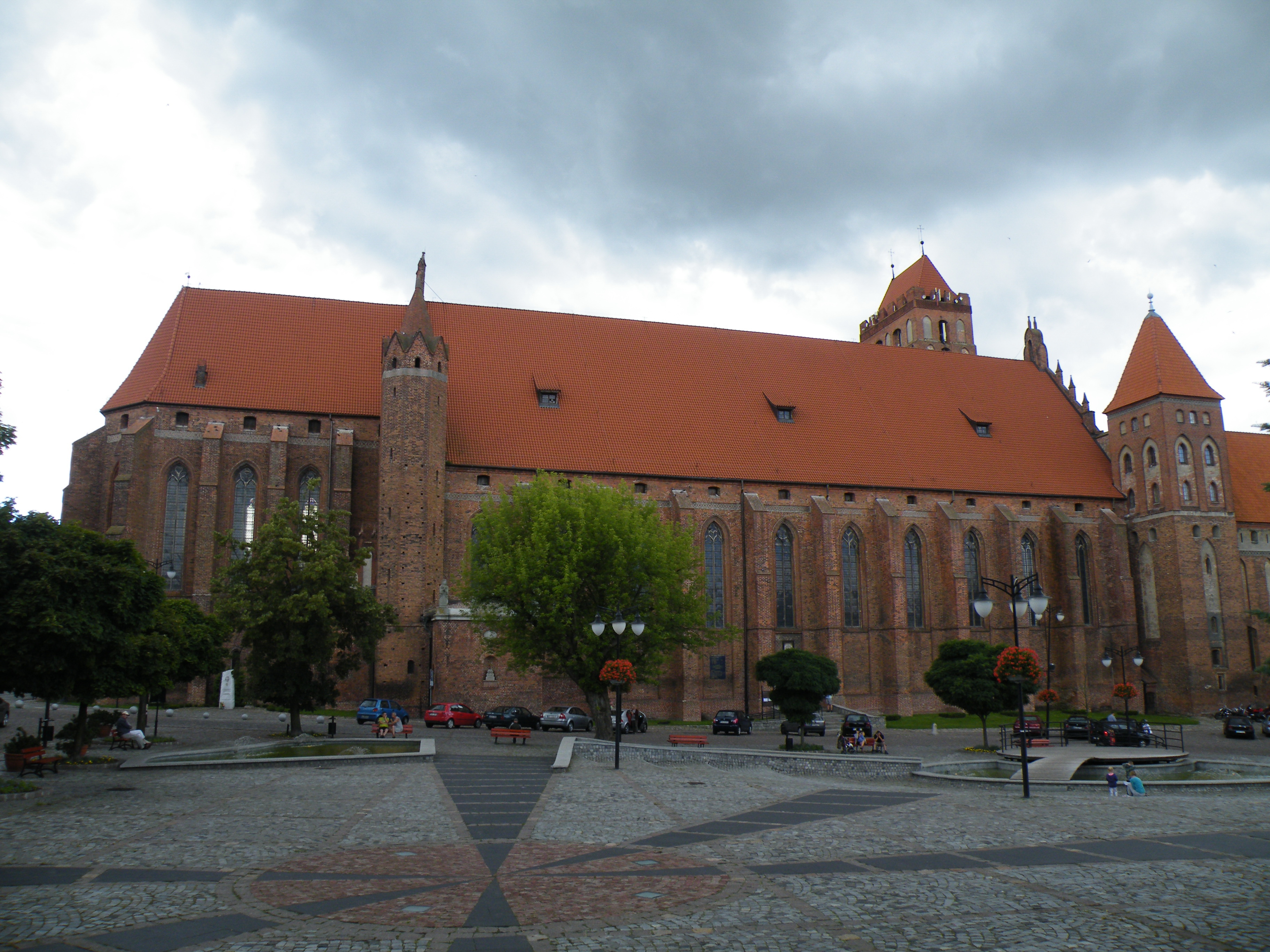
Kwidzyn Cathedral

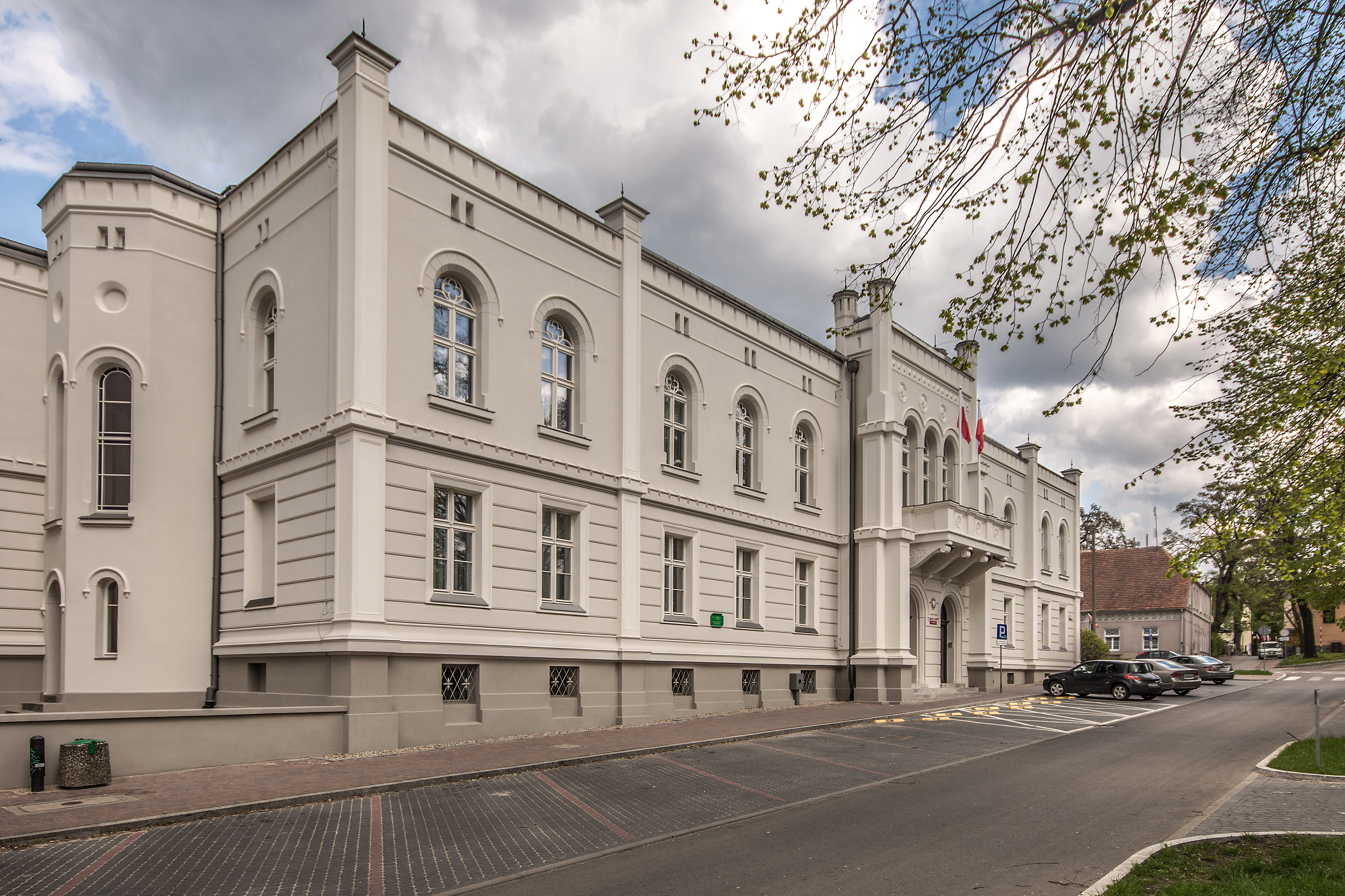
District court

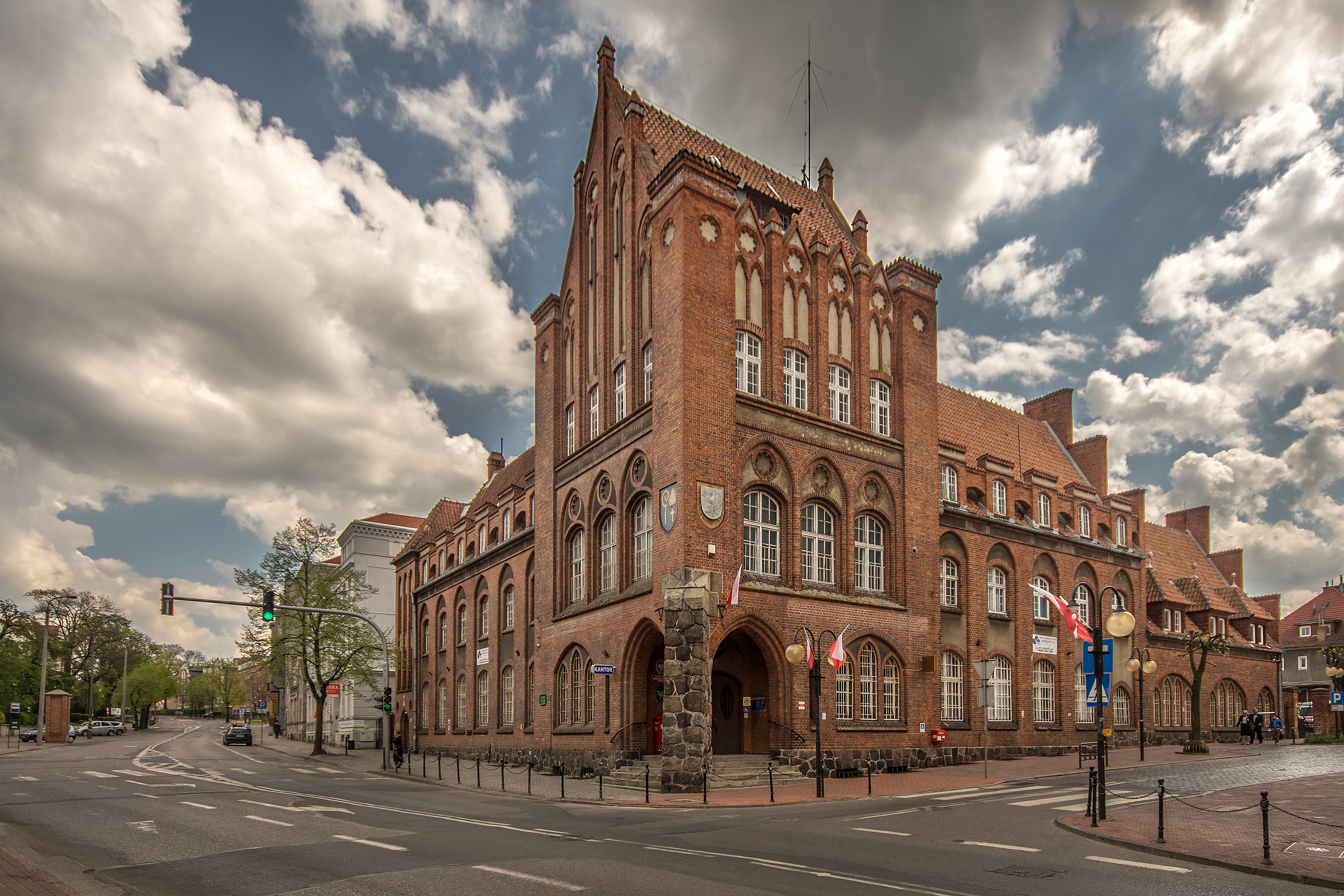
Main post office

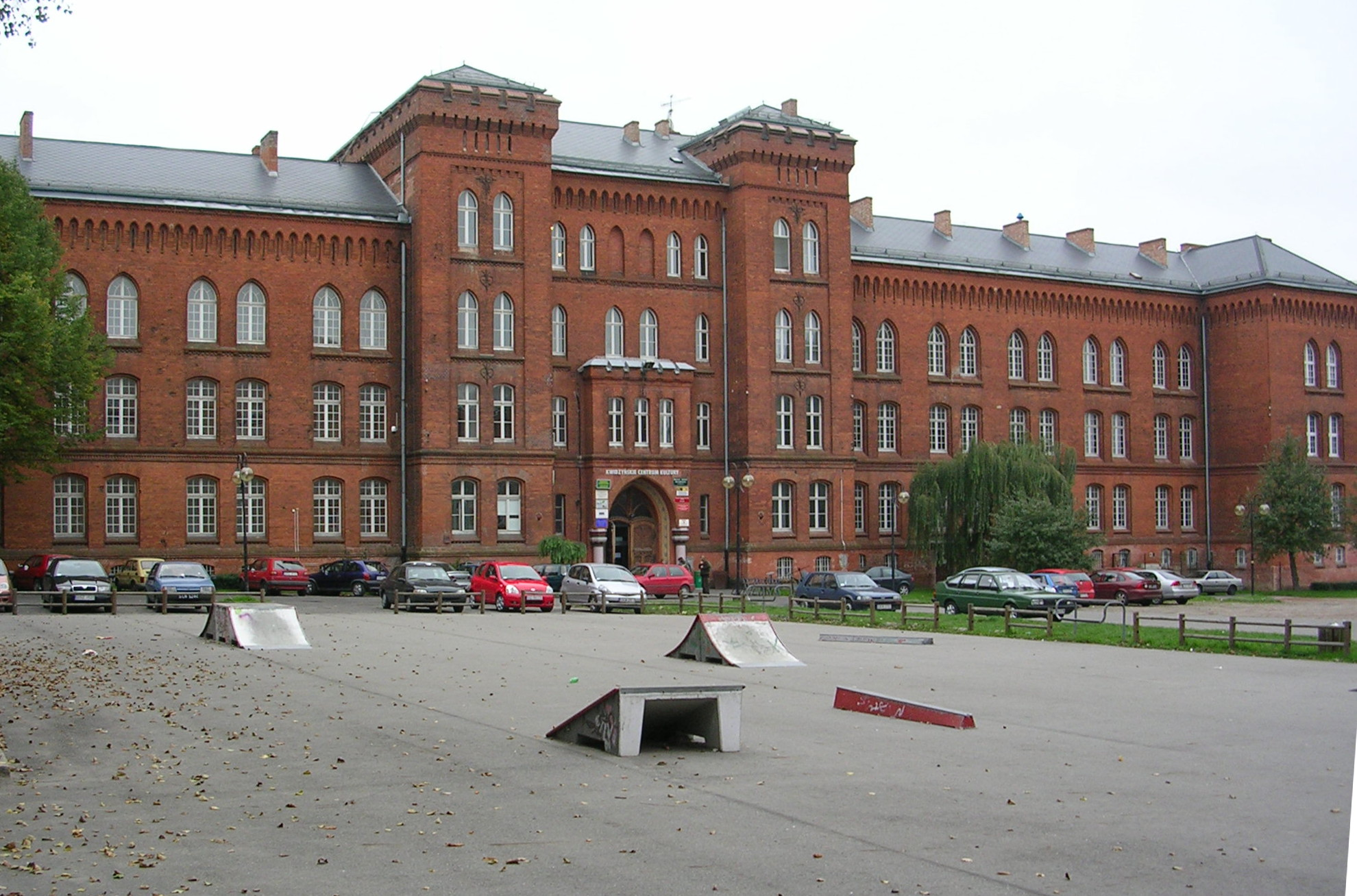
Powiślańska Szkoła Wyższa (Powiśle College)

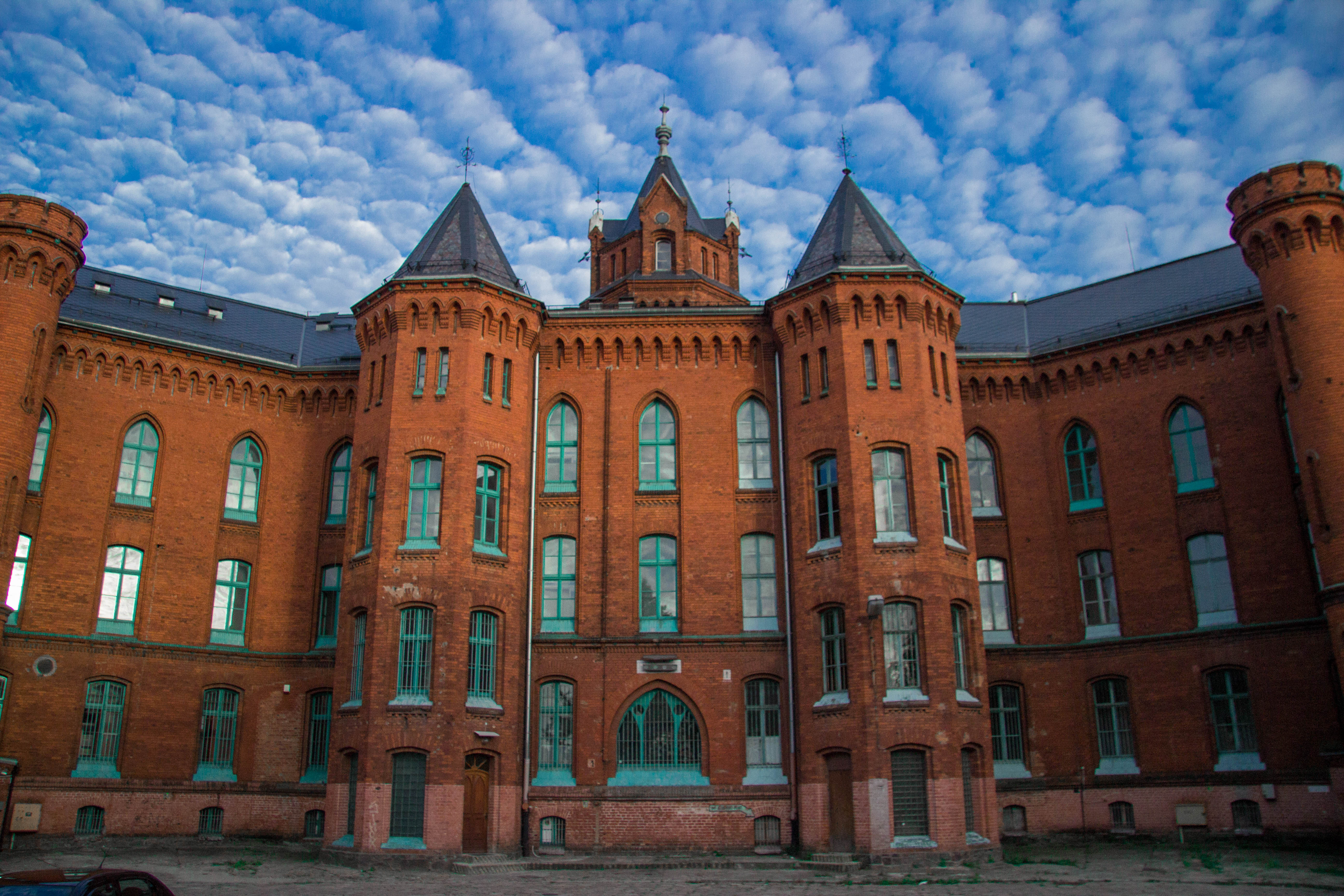
Neo-gothic complex of barracks, 19th century

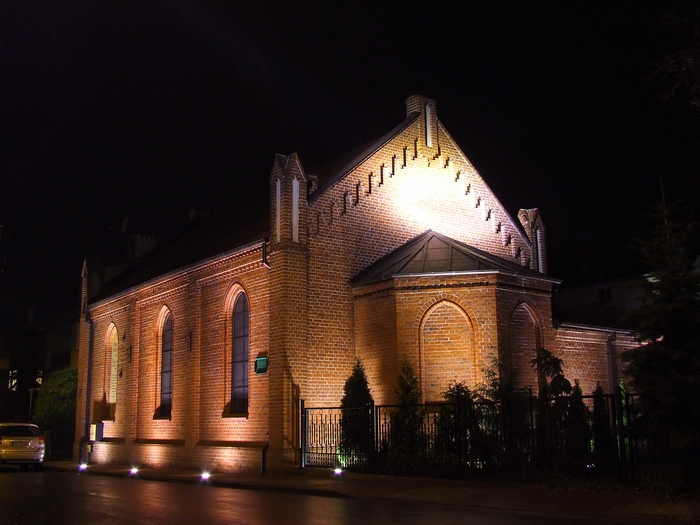
Saint Padre Pio chapel

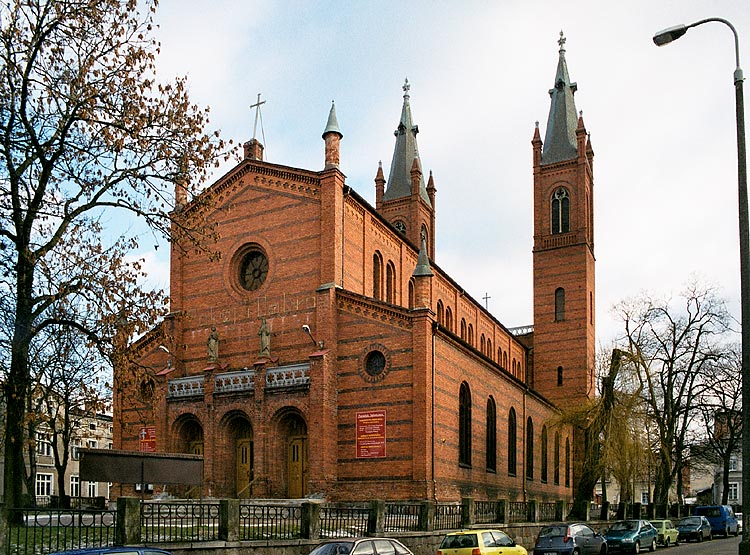
Holy Trinity church

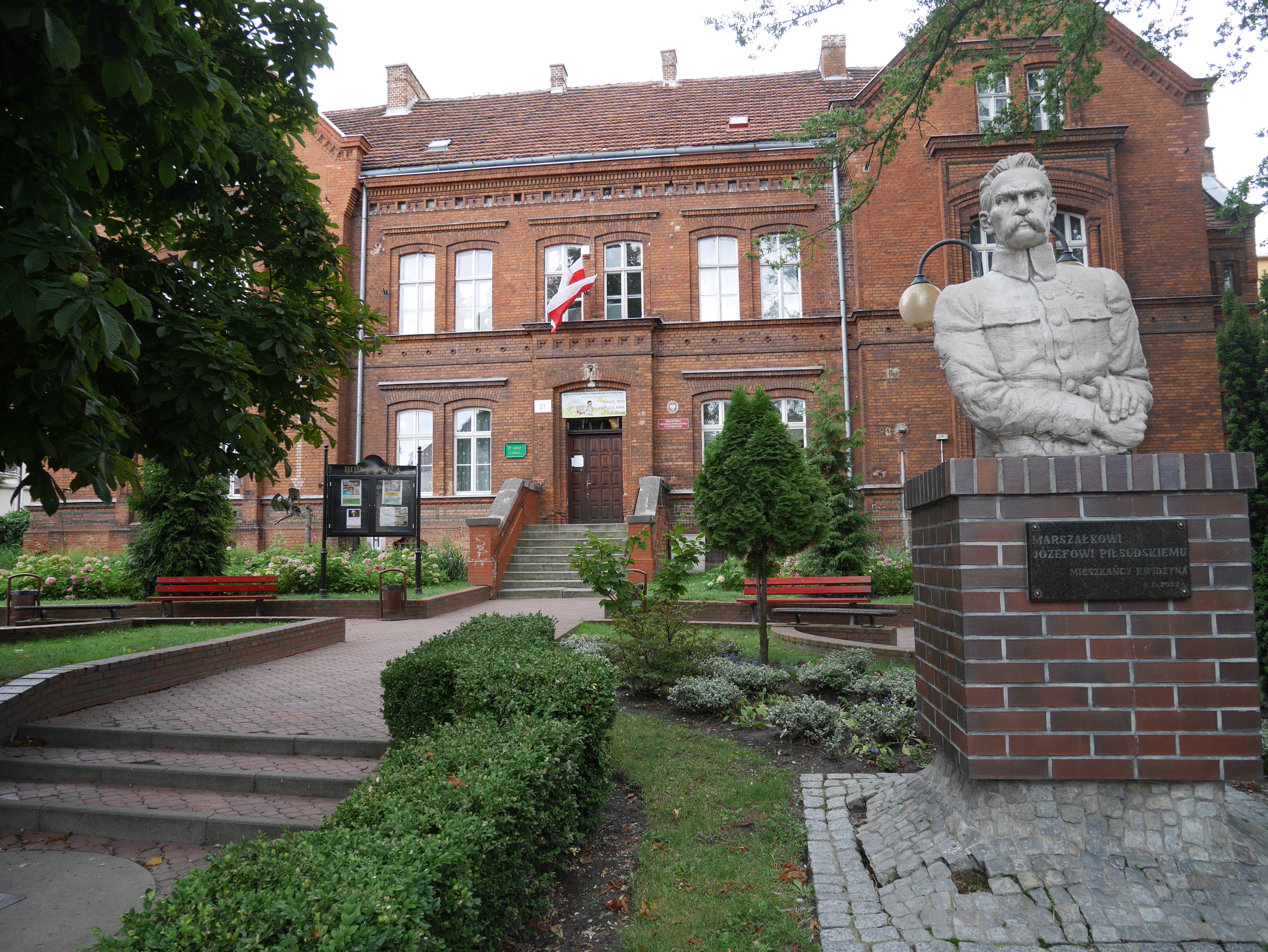
Library and a monument of Józef Piłsudski

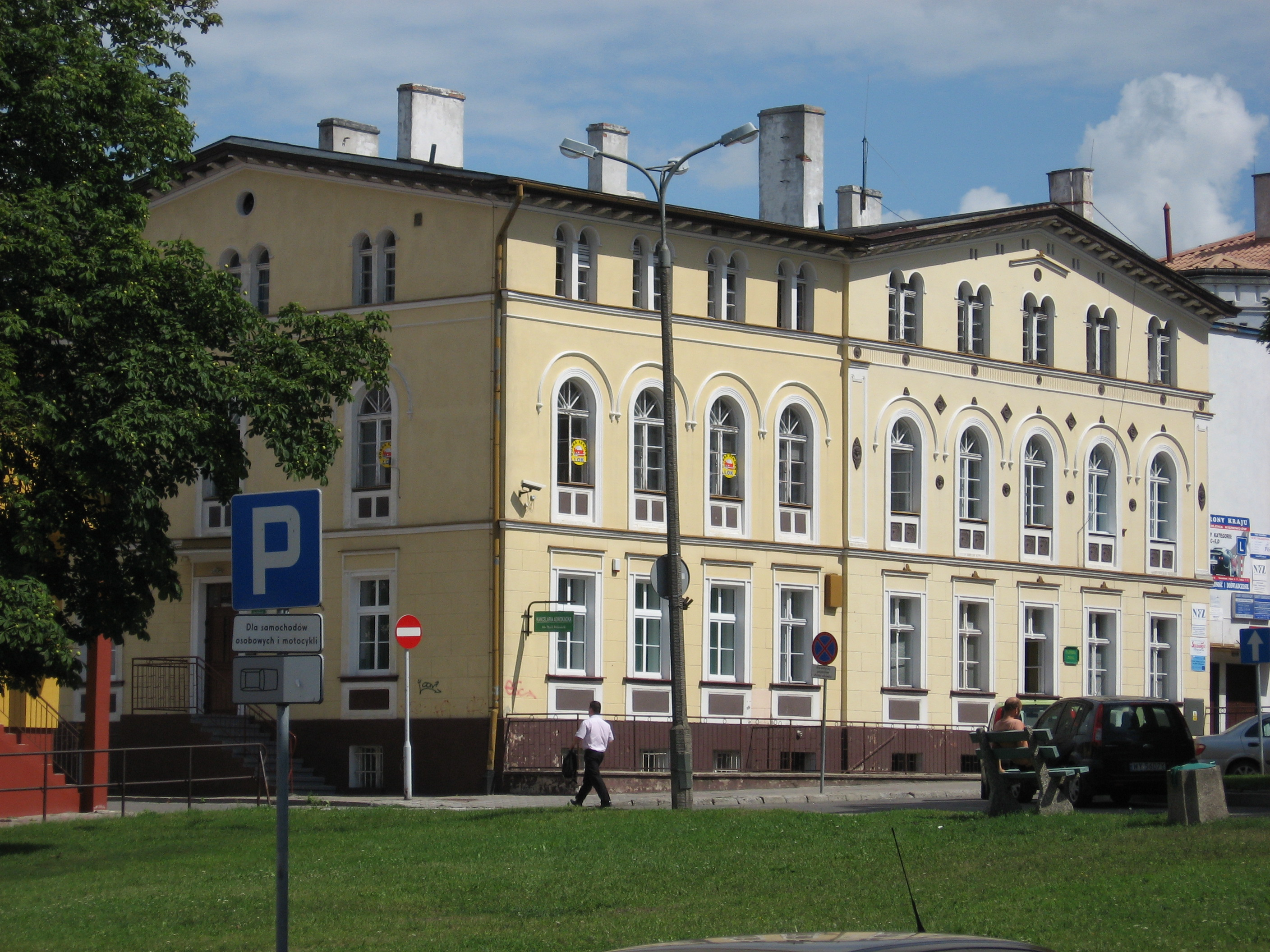
Former Saint George hospital

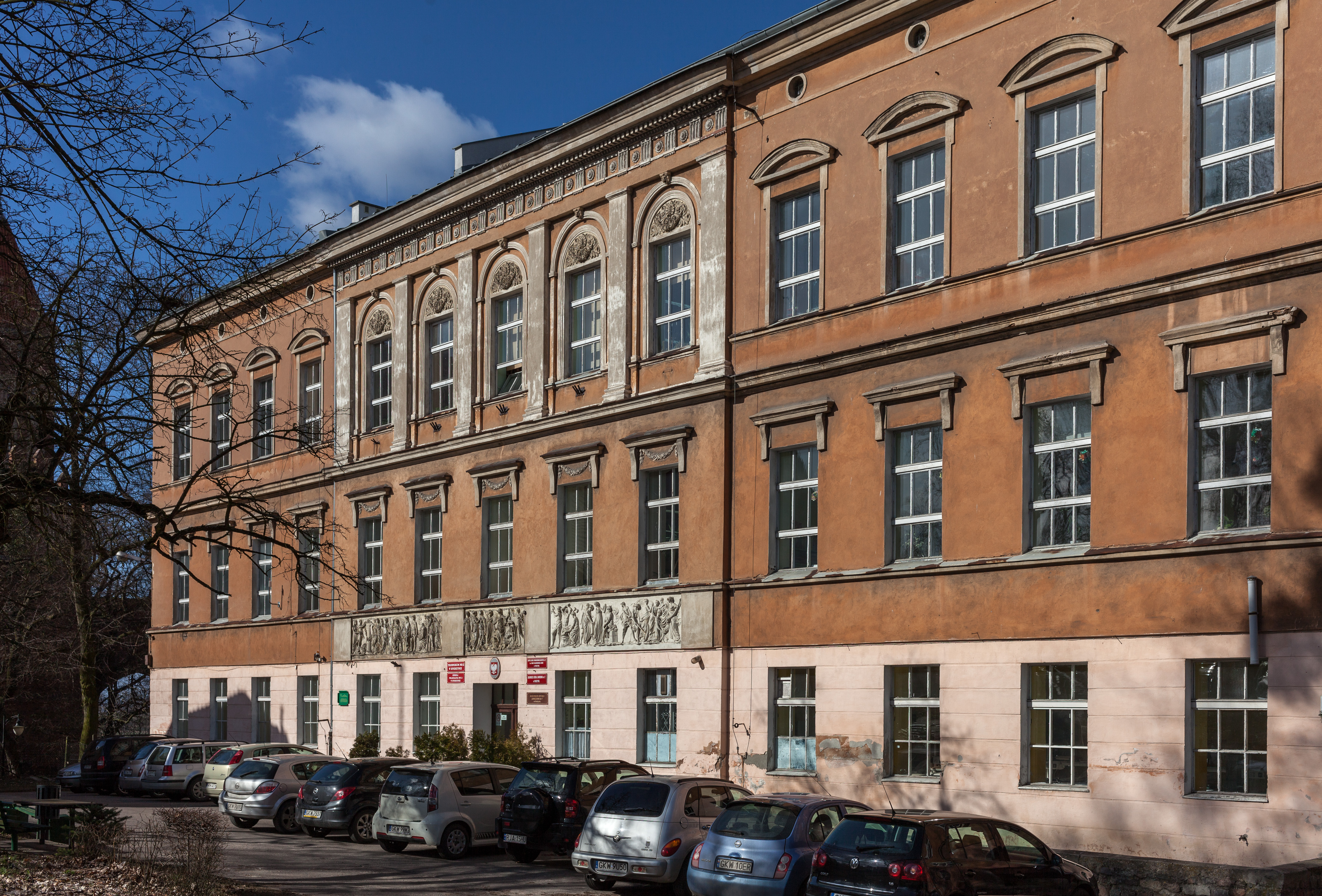
Vocational school

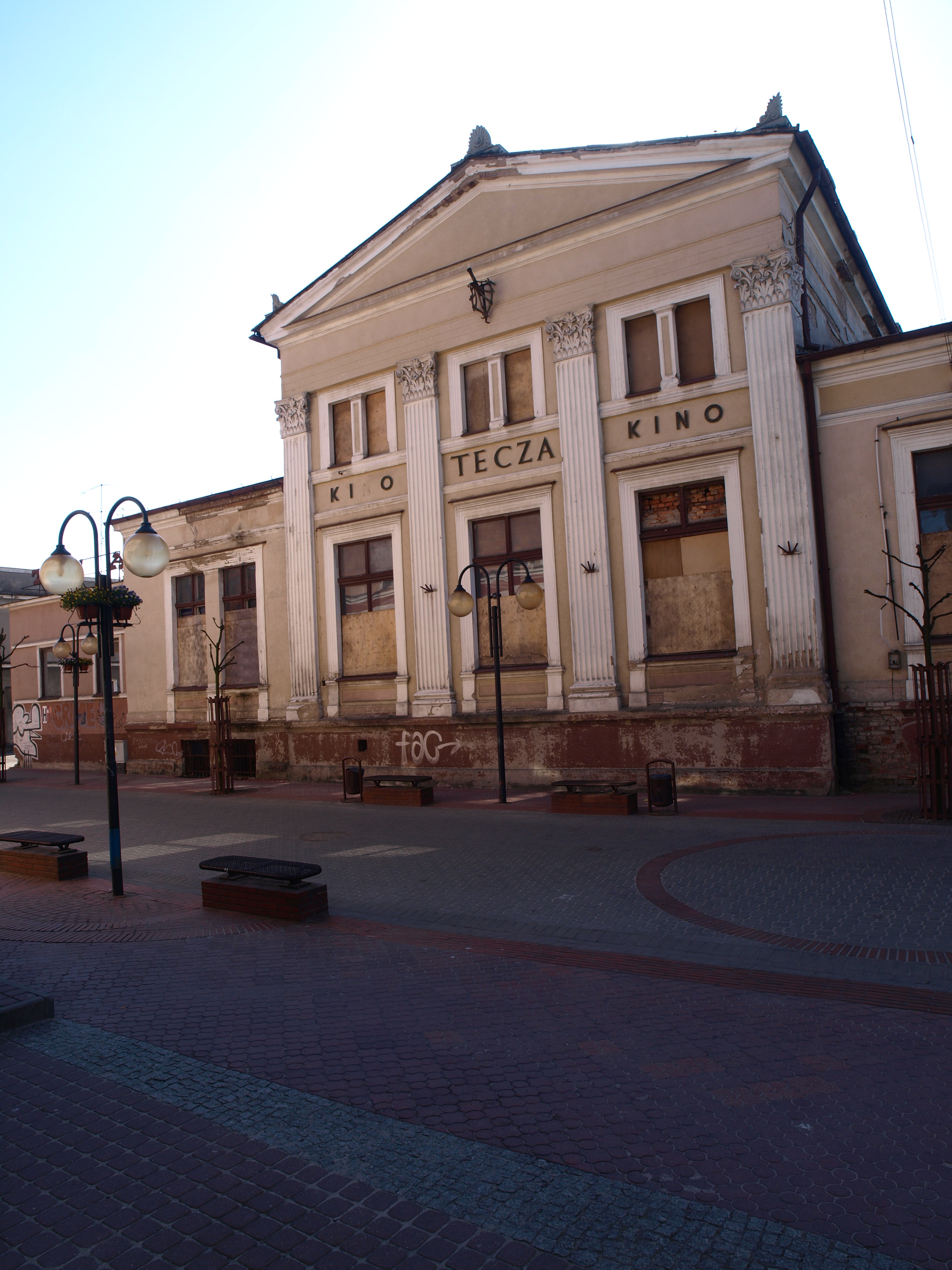
Former casino and cinema building

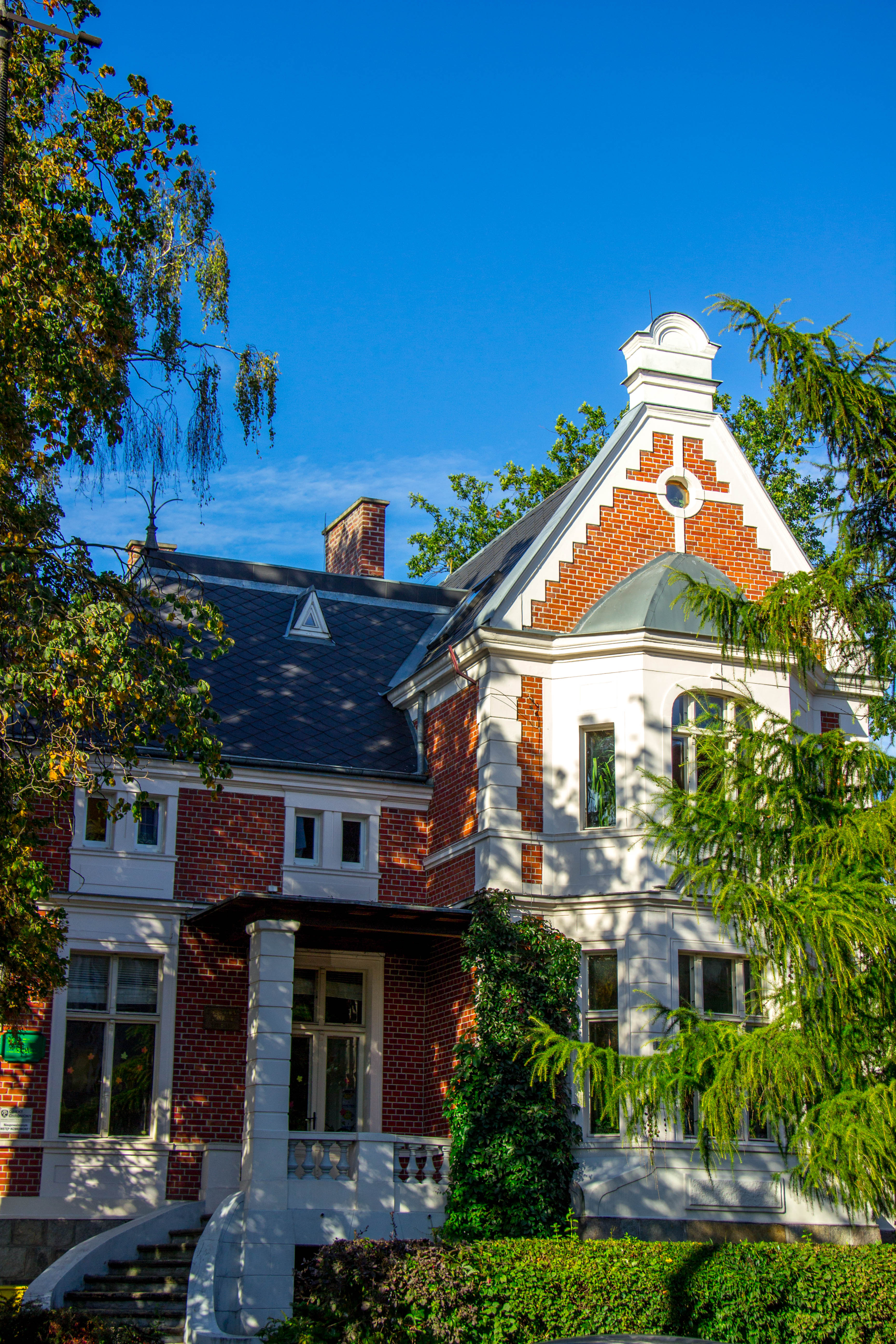
Municipal Preschool No. 1

== International relations ==
Kwidzyn is twinned with:

Bar, Ukraine	Celle, Germany	Olofström, Sweden

== Sources ==
- Neuman, Franz; Gründer, Otto (1983). Marienwerder Westpreußen: Aus den Leben einer deutschen Stadt an der unteren Weichsel. Heimatkreis Marienwerder/Westpreußen. pp. 315–316.
