= Kiani Crown =

Traditional coronation crown in the Iranian Crown Jewels

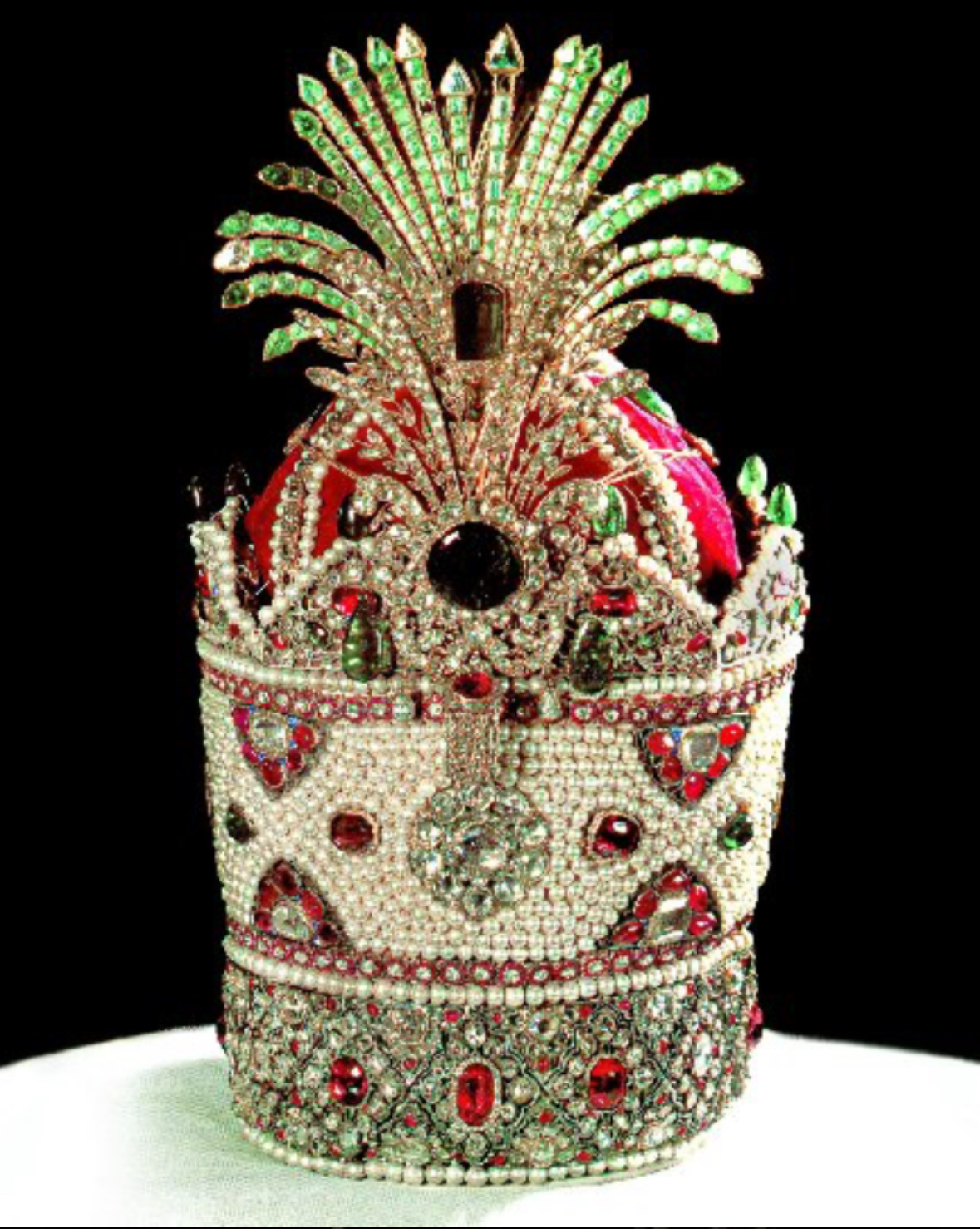
- The Kiani Crown at the Treasury of National Jewels

Heraldic depictions

Details
- Country: Iran
- Made: 1796
- Material: Gold, silver
- Cap: Red Velvet
- Notable stones: Pearl, diamond

The Kiani Crown (Persian: تاج کیانی) was the traditional coronation crown in the Iranian Crown Jewels, worn by the Qajar shahs of Iran (1789–1925). The crown was designed under the first Qajar shah Agha Mohammad Khan Qajar (r. 1789–1797). Its design is directly derived from the Persian crowns of the ancient Sasanian shahs (224–651) and mythological Kiyani shahs of Persian mythology.

The crown itself is made of red velvet, on which thousands of gems were set. The Kiani Crown is highly decorated, possessing 1800 small pearls stitched onto it, with many having only 7 millimetres in diameter. It has approximately 300 emeralds and 1,800 rubies. The crown is 32 cm (12.5 in.) high and 19.5 cm (7.5 in.) wide. It is currently kept in the National Treasury of Iran in Tehran.

Reza Shah, the founder of the Pahlavi dynasty, had his own Pahlavi Crown designed, but the Kiani Crown was present during his coronation in 1926.

Middle and New Persian kay(an) originates from Eastern Iranian Avestan kavi (or kauui) meaning "king" and also "poet-sacrificer" or "poet-priest

== Gallery ==
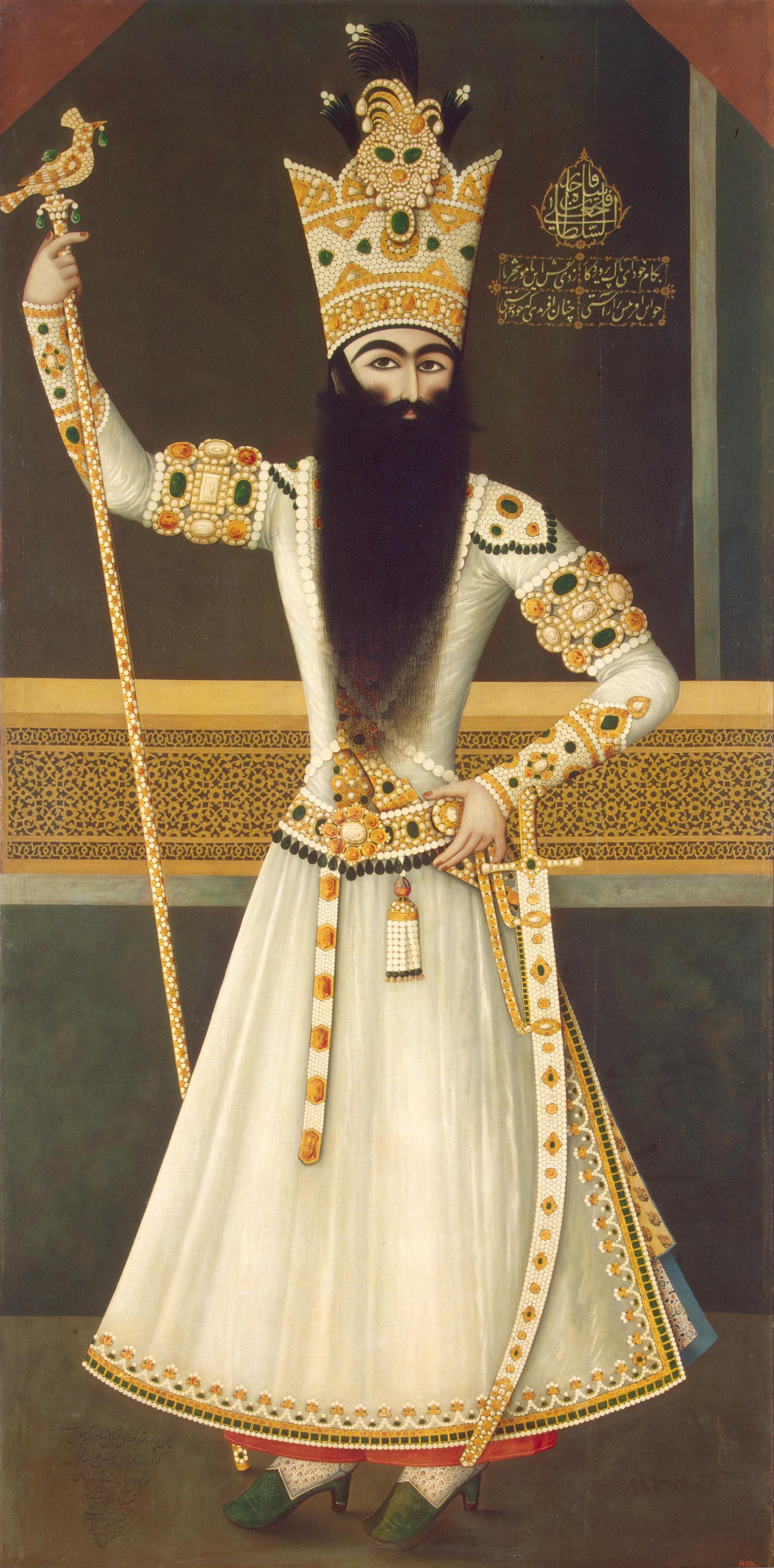
Fath-Ali Shah Qajar wearing the Kiani Crown, 1809/10

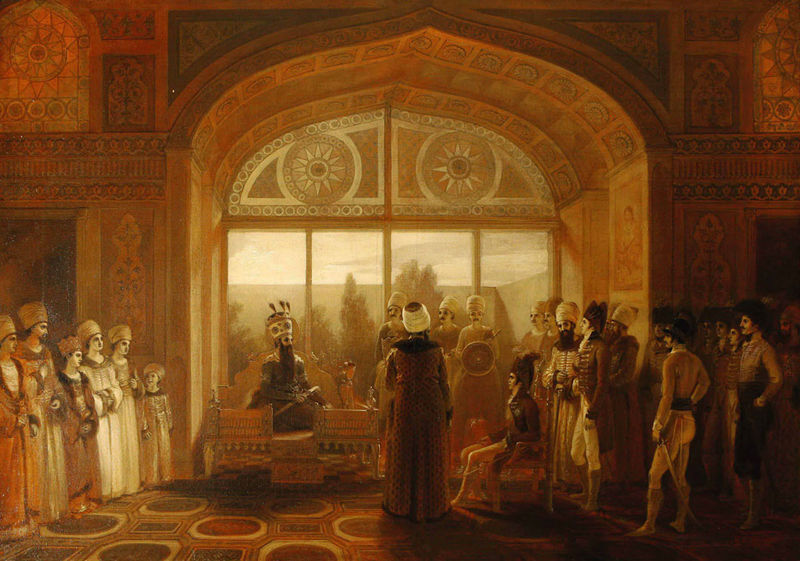
Fath-Ali Shah, seated on the Sun Throne and wearing the Kiani Crown, grants an audience to Sir Harford Jones, by Robert Smirke, 1809–10

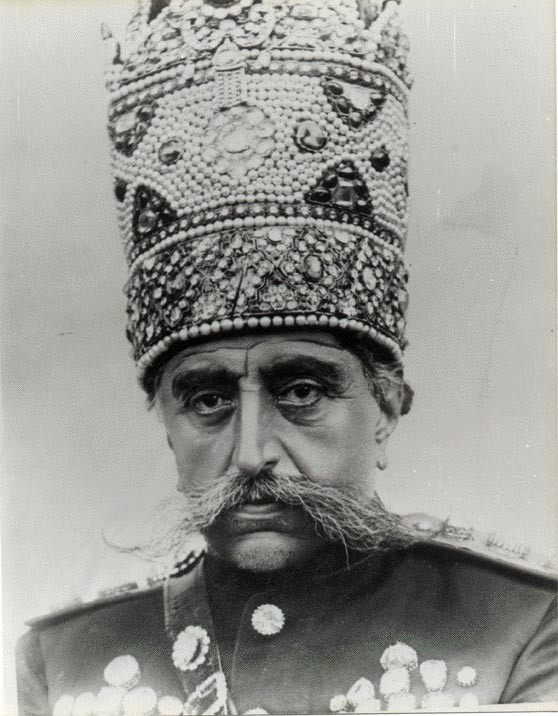
Mozaffar ad-Din Shah Qajar wearing the Kiani Crown, turn of the century

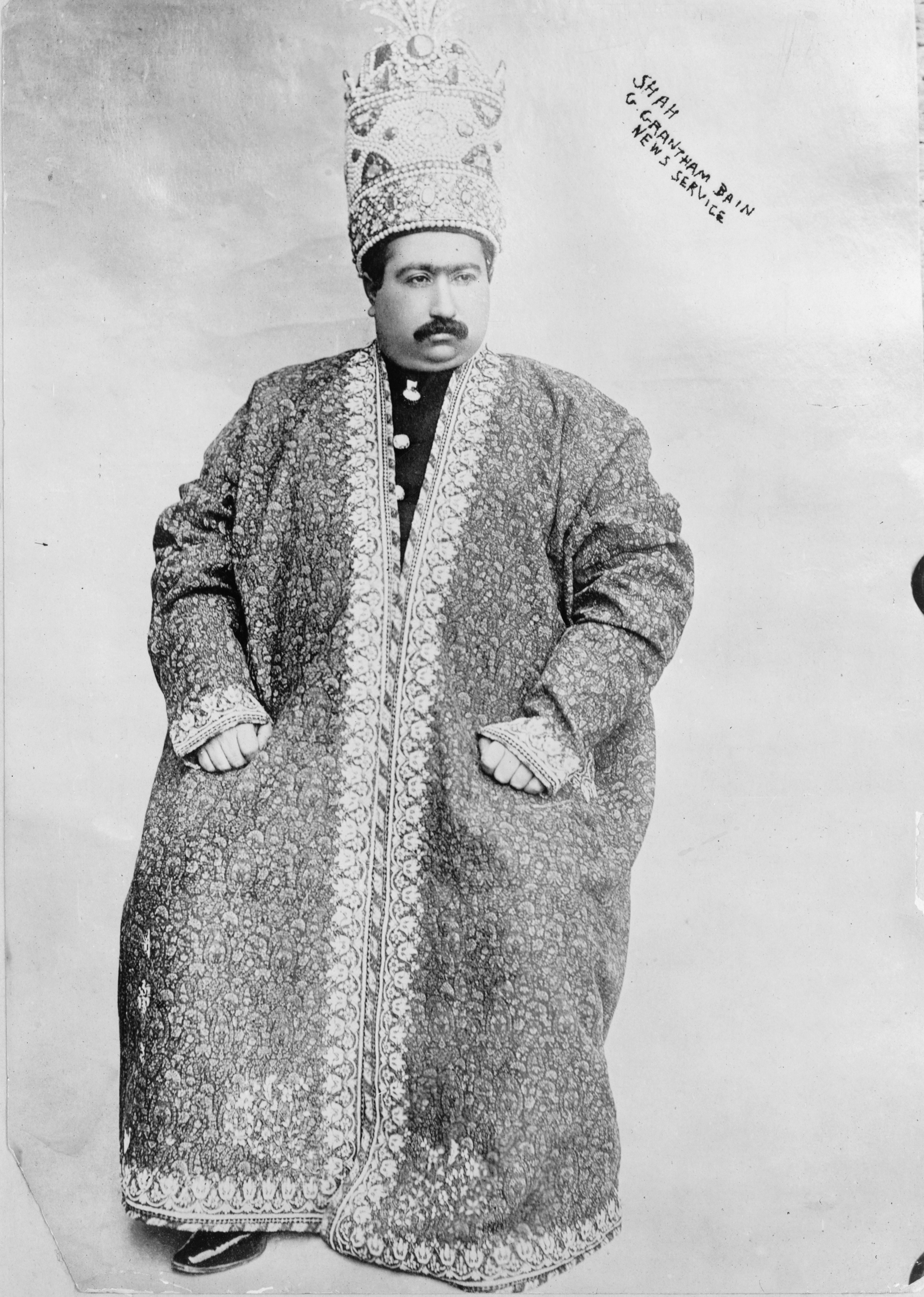
Mohammad Ali Shah Qajar wearing the Kiani Crown, 1907

== See also ==
- Iranian National Jewels
- Kayani
- Naderi Throne

== Sources ==
- Daryaee, Touraj (2016). "Persianate Contribution to the Study of Antiquity: E'temad Al-Saltaneh's Nativisation of the Qajars". Iran: Journal of the British Institute of Persian Studies. 54 (1): 39–45. doi:10.1080/05786967.2016.11882299.
