= Gustav Cohn =

German economist (1840–1919)

Gustav Cohn (12 December 1840 in Marienwerder, West Prussia – 17 September 1919) was a German economist, noted for his pioneering contributions to the theory and policy of transportation and public finance. He was educated at Berlin and Jena universities. During 1867 and 1868 he was the holder of a fellowship at the Royal Statistical Bureau of Berlin, and in 1869 became privat-docent at the University of Heidelberg, but in the same year accepted an invitation from the Polytechnikum at Riga. Cohn paid a visit to England in 1873, and the fruits of his observation and research were embodied in the masterly production "Untersuchungen über die Englische Eisenbahnpolitik," 2 vols., Leipzig, 1874-75. In 1875, he was invited to fill the chair of economics at ETH Zurich, which he held until 1884, when he became professor in the University of Göttingen.

While at Zurich he prepared for publication his "Volkswirtschaftliche Aufsätze" (Stuttgart, 1882), and contributed to the "Göttingische Gelehrte Anzeigen" (1880, i. 97-135) an exhaustive critical review of the first volume of Wagner's "Allgemeine Volkswirtschaftlehre." The names of Wagner and Cohn have often been coupled, not only because both were classed among the Katheder-Socialisten, but also because they have much in common in their attitude toward the various so-called schools of economic science. In continuation of his study of the English railroad policy, and as the third volume of his earlier work on that subject, appeared his "Die Englische Eisenbahnpolitik der Letzten Zehn Jahre," Leipzig, 1883.

After his establishment at Göttingen a period of ardent literary activity set in. The first volume of the greatest work which he has yet produced, his "System der Nationalökonomie," was published in 1885, the very next year after his arrival. It is significant of the importance and character of this work that two such great leaders of the respective opposing "schools" as Wagner and Schmoller should unite in praising it.

In 1886, he contributed to the "Jahrbuch für Nationalökonomie"(vol. xiii, No. 6), "Zur Fabrikgesetzgebung," a review of government reports on factory legislation in Switzerland and Saxony, and to the "Jahrbuch für Gesetzgebung" (x.3), "Eröterungen über die Fiskalische Behandlung der Verkehrsanstalten." In that year, too, appeared his "Nationalökonomische Studien," Stuttgart, 1886.

The year 1889 witnessed the publication of the second volume of his "System der Nationalökonomie," and his "Finanzwissenschaft."

Cohn was elected a regular member of the Gesellschaft der Wissenschaften at Göttingen in 1894; and in 1896 the Prussian Order of the Red Eagle of the fourth class was conferred upon him. After an interval of nearly ten years he completed the third volume of the "System der Nationalökonomie," which was also issued under the title "Nationalökonomie des Handelsund Verkehrswesens: Ein Lesebuch für Studierende," Stuttgart, 1898. To the "Jahrbuch für Nationalökonomie" (vi, Jan., 1901) he contributed "Ueber die Vereinigung der Staatswissenschaften mit den Juristenfacultäten."

== Works ==
- "Untersuchungen über die Englische Eisenbahnpolitik". 2 vols in 1 (Leipzig, 1874 and 1875)
- "Volkswirtschaftliche Aufsätze" (Stuttgart, 1882)
- "Die englische Eisenbahnpolitik der letzten zehn Jahre (1873-1883)" (Leipzig, 1883)
- "System der Nationalökonomie" (Stuttgart, 1885-1898, 3 vols.)
  - "Vol. 1 - Grundlegung der Nationalökonomie (Stuttgart, 1885);
  - "Vol. 2 - System der Finanzwissenschaft" (Stuttgart, 1889); Vol. 2, transl. by Thorstein Veblen,, (Chicago, 1895)
  - "Vol. 3 - Nationalökonomie des Handels und des Verkehrswesens (Stuttgart, 1898)
- "Nationalökonomische Studien" (1886)
- "Die deutsche Frauenbewegung. Eine Betrachtung über deren Entwickelung und Ziele (Berlin, 1896)
- "Zur Geschichte and Politik des Verkehrswesens" (Stuttgart, 1900)
- "Ethik und Soziologie (Leipzig, 1916)
- "Universitätsfragen und Erinnerungen (Stuttgart, 1918)
