= Fritz Goerdeler =

German politician and resistance member (1886–1945)

- Fritz Goerdeler

Municipal Chamberlain of Königsberg
- In office 1934–1944

Bürgermeister of Marienwerder
- In office 1920–1933

East Prussian Landtag Deputy
- In office 1921–1933

Personal details
- Born: 6 March 1886 Schneidemühl, East Prussia, German Empire
- Died: 1 March 1945 (aged 58) Plötzensee Prison, Berlin, Nazi Germany
- Cause of death: Execution by hanging
- Party: German National People's Party
- Relatives: Carl Friedrich Goerdeler (brother)
- Profession: Lawyer

Fritz Hermann Goerdeler (6 March 1886 – 1 March 1945) was a German lawyer and politician who joined the German resistance movement against Nazism. He was imprisoned and executed after the failed 20 July plot to assassinate Adolf Hitler.

== Early life and political career ==
Goerdeler was born as the younger brother of Carl Friedrich Goerdeler in Schneidemühl (today Piła, Poland) and grew up in Marienwerder (today, Kwidzyn) where his father had taken office as a judge at the local court in 1890. Goerdeler studied law and worked as a lawyer. He was married and had three daughters and a son. In 1920, he became the Bürgermeister (mayor) of Marienwerder and was reelected in 1932. From 1921, he represented the city as a German National People's Party deputy in the provincial parliament of East Prussia. However, he was forced to resign his positions in 1933 after he refused to join the Nazi Party.

== Resistance and death ==
Goerdeler became the municipal chamberlain (treasurer) of Königsberg from 1934 until 1944, and joined the German resistance movement against the Nazis. He had close contact with the military resistance, especially in East Prussia. Goerdeler was arrested by the Gestapo after the failed 20 July plot, imprisoned and sentenced to death by the Volksgerichtshof on 23 February 1945. He was hanged at Plötzensee prison on 1 March 1945.
