= Liwa (river) =

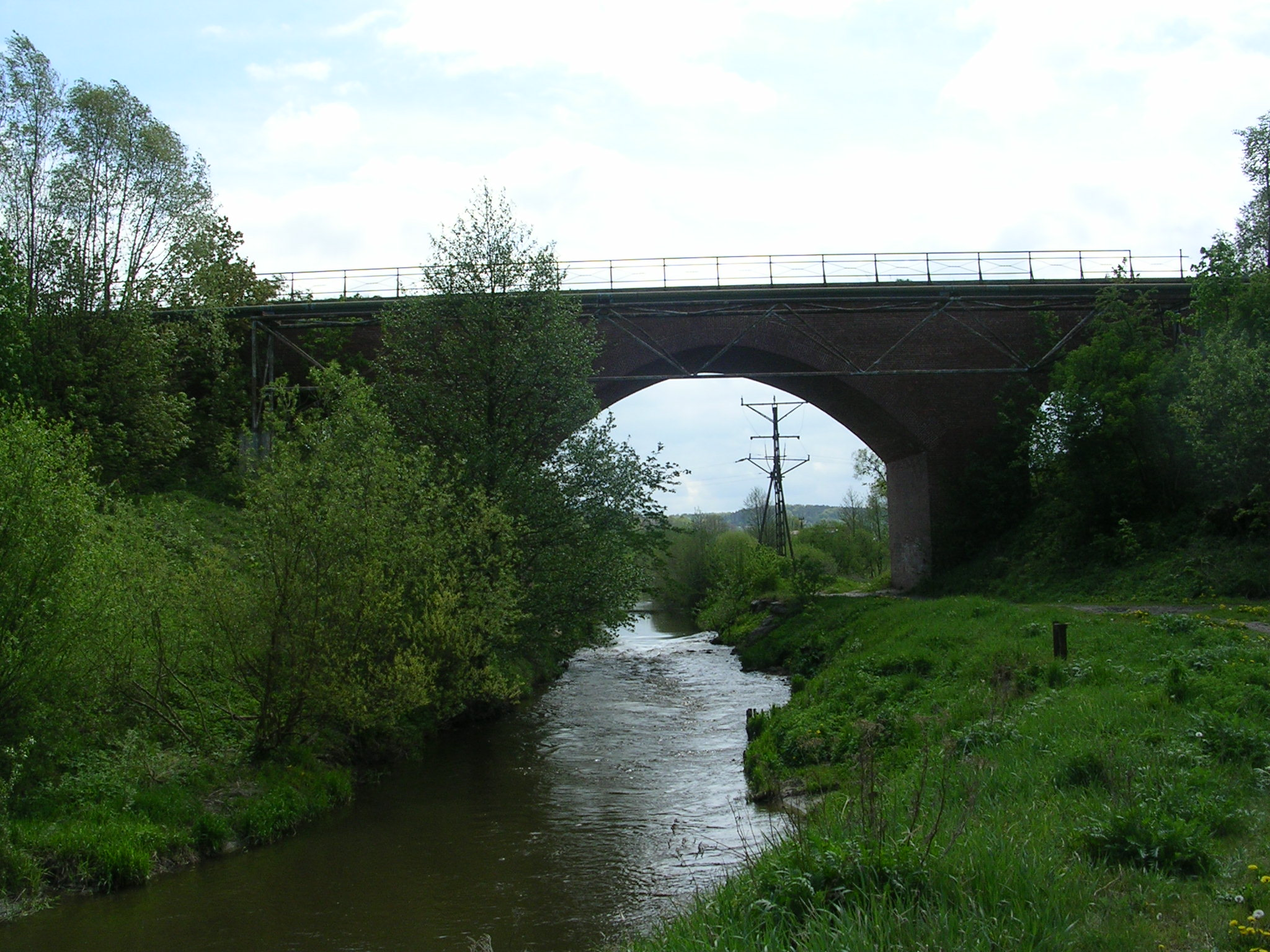
- Liwa near Kwidzyn

Location
- Country: Poland

Physical characteristics
- Mouth
  - location: Nogat
  - coordinates: 53°54′50″N 18°53′04″E

Basin features
- Progression: Nogat→ Vistula Lagoon

The Liwa or Liva is a river in northern Poland and a tributary of the Nogat. The hydropower plants located in the upper reaches of the river produce up to 200 kW. The total length of the Liwa is approximately 110 kilometres (68 mi). The biggest city on the river is Kwidzyn, located upstream.

== See also ==
- Rivers of Poland
