= Józef Krasnowolski =

Polish modernist painter

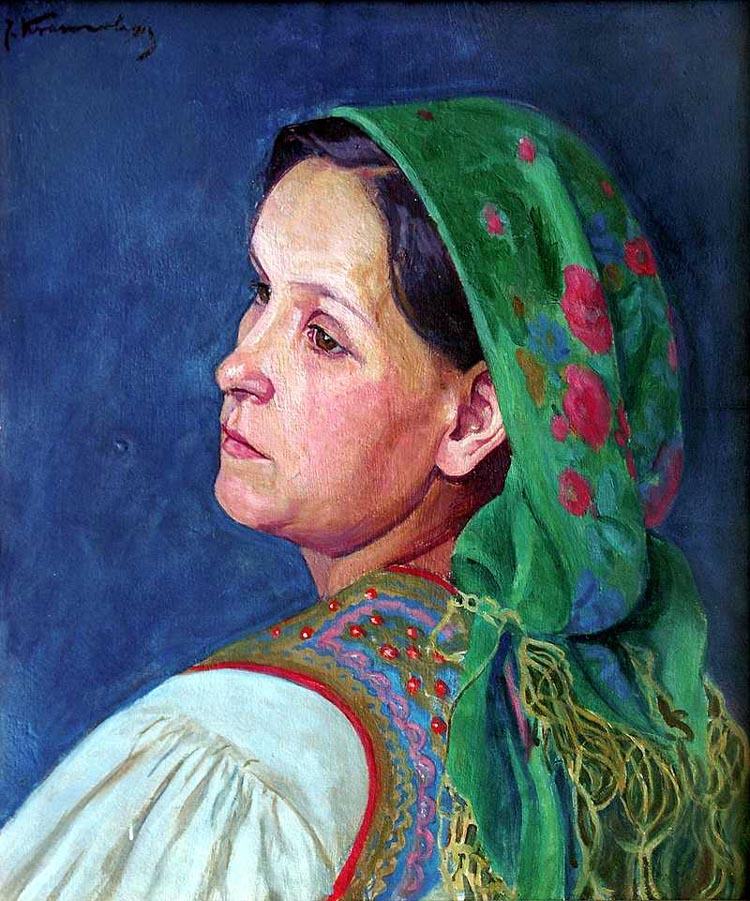
Portret żony w stroju krakowskim

Józef Krasnowolski (15 November 1879 – 29 November 1939) was a Polish painter.

== Biography ==
Krasnowolski was born in Marienwerder ( Kwidzyn ), Province of West Prussia. He was the second son of Antoni Krasnowolski (1855–1911), teacher, philologist and translator, and Augusta von Thumen (d. in 1935).

Krasnowolski first studied art in Warsaw with Wojciech Gerson (from 1896), then in Kraków at Szkoła Sztuk Pięknych with Jacek Malczewski (from 1898 to 1900), and with Leon Wyczółkowski (1900/1901). He completed his education by studying in Munich, Germany, during 1901 and 1902.

During an open-air session in the village of Bieńczyce near Kraków, he met his future wife, Salomea Wiktoria Turbas (1882–1957), daughter of wealthy peasant family (Grzegorz and Salomea née Biernacik). The family tradition makes the Turbasa family descendants of captive Tatar cavalry. The wedding took place on 5 November 1902 in the Kraków Church of St Nicolas, the wedding reception in the bride's cottage in Bieńczyce, and gathered the artistic milieu of the city led by Leon Wyczółkowski.

Until 1914 the couple lived in a peasant cottage. They had four sons: Franciszek (1903–1944), a talented artist who died of tuberculosis; Kazimierz Krasnowolski (teacher and biologist); Witold – the family's adventurer who emigrated to Brazil where for a time he presided over the Union of Poles (Związek Polaków), tried his hand in coffee planting and opening bus lines, and raised nine children (his own and adopted); and Włodzimierz (1912–1981), a soldier of the Home Army (AK) in the Second World War, when he was made to hide under Stalinist terrorism.

Krasnowolski joined well-known artistic organisations in Kraków, Warsaw, and Vienna, and his works were included in an album of Polish art published in Paris in 1912. He also published a series of post-cards in order to provide additional income. World War I greatly impacted the Polish art market; forced to teach drawing in secondary school and to work for the Polish Telegraphic Agency, he was troubled by poor health. Despite glaucoma and partial paralysis in his hands (beginning in 1926), he continued to paint and to receive awards – the last one in 1934 for Cottage in the Sun.

He became embittered in his last years, when he was forced to draw on the support of his son Kazimierz, who was a young teacher at that time. Despondent by the outbreak of World War II, he died within a few weeks of its outbreak (on 29 November 1939). He was buried at the Rakowice Cemetery.

== Work ==
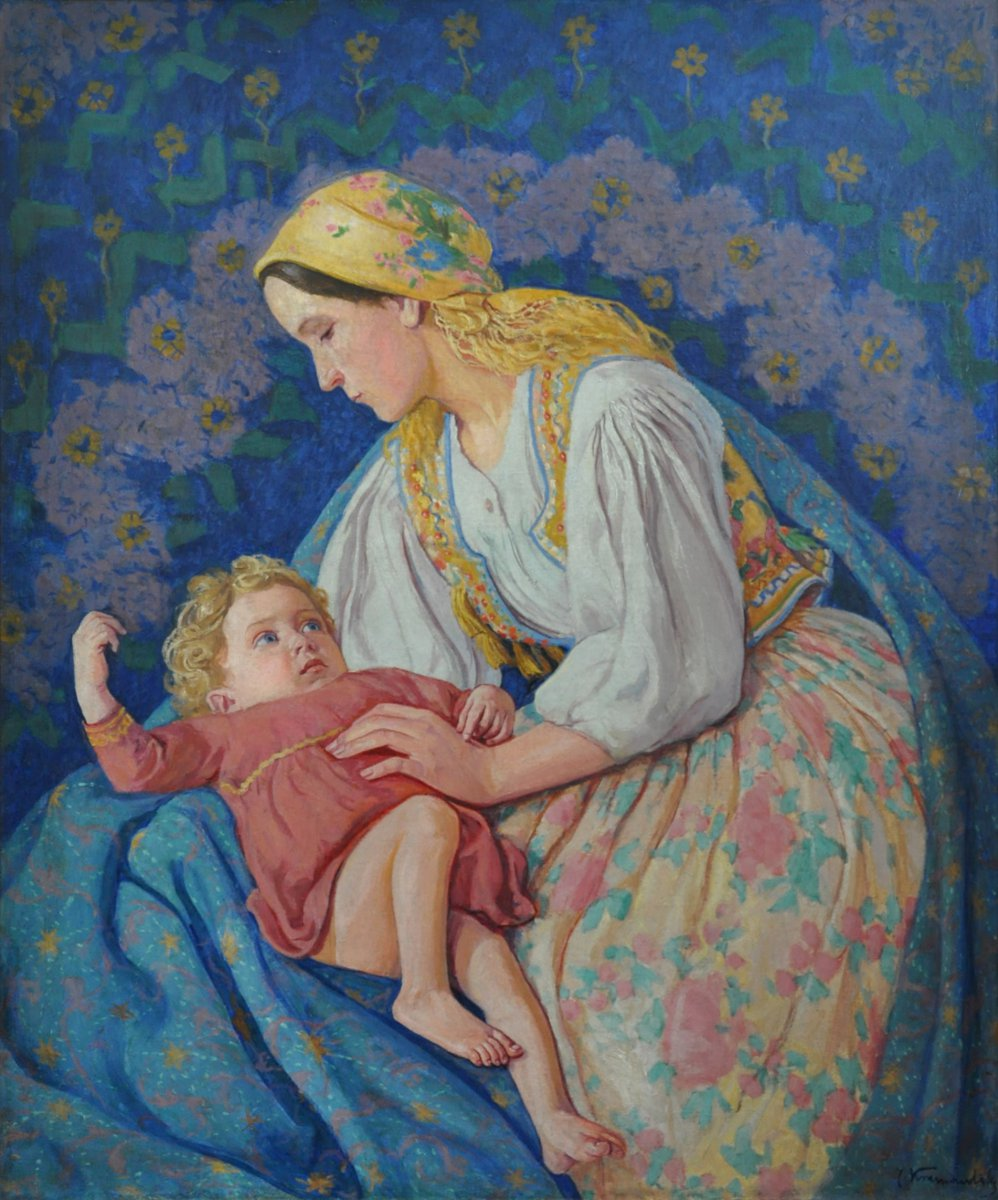
Madonna

Krasnowolski's paintings are dominated by peaceful landscapes with blue-and-rusty striped cottages, portraits of young girls in regional costumes (most often it was his wife who did the modelling), and children – especially his own sons. Beginning in 1903 he regularly participated in exhibitions by Kraków's Towarzystwo Przyjaciół Sztuk Pięknych and Warsaw's Zacheta, Poznań, Lvov (Lviv), and abroad: in Prague, Vienna, Munich, Budapest, Kiev, and Dresden.

Highly recognized by the critics and magazines (Tygodnik Ilustrowany, Świat, Sfinks, and Życie i Sztuka), he was most praised for the choice of subject and mood. Especially famous are his Peasant Madonnas in a highly Polish style. His most valued works originated during and after the artist's stay in Paris (1909). This was his time of greatest recognition; he participated in exhibitions with the leading artists of the Młoda Polska (Young Poland) movement, and in 1911 was awarded the highest prize at the 1st Exhibition of Sacred Art in Kraków for his "Heart of Jesus" (today in the altar of the Church in Krzesławice), and a few days later – for the "Four Bathing Boys" (portrait of his sons) in Vienna.
