= Basket Kwidzyn =

Polish basketball team

MTS Basket Kwidzyn is a Polish basketball team, based in Kwidzyn.

== Achievements ==
- Promotion to the I Liga in 2004
- Promotion to the Dominet Bank Ekstraliga in the 2006–07 season
- 8th place in Dominet Bank Ekstraliga after regular season, 9th place after pre-play-off in the 2007–08 season
