= Wojciech Belon =

Polish singer, frontman of Wolna Grupa Bukowina

Wojciech Belon (March 14, 1952, in Kwidzyn – May 3, 1985, in Kraków), also known as Wojtek Bellon, was a Polish poet, songwriter, and folksinger.

== Biography ==
Belon's best-known ballad, Majster Bieda (Master Poor), and most of his compositions have never been released by government-controlled media. At that time, it was dominated by establishment-approved songwriters such as Agnieszka Osiecka. This didn't affect their success, as most college students and Polish youth knew them by heart from amateur tapes recorded at student festivals, tourist festivals, and similar musical events. The events mainly took place in Kraków, 1974, Zielona Góra, 1985, Busko Zdrój, Tarnów, and Gdańsk. In Poland, you can hear them until this very day as part of the repertoire of many bands. Belon was a symbol of the youth frustration of the so-called lost generation of the late 1960s, 1970s, and early 1980s in Poland. His writings were inspiring in the way Bob Dylan's songs in America were. The circumstances of his death in 1985 have never been disclosed.

== Bibliography ==
- SLM Ballada– biography (Polish)
- Stachuriada– poetry (Polish)
- Majster Bieda (WGB) on YouTube – music (by a band formed originally by Belon himself)
- Majster Bieda (11 ADH Polana) on YouTube – music (by a Boy Scouts group)
