= Kiani (surname) =

Kiani is the surname of the following people:

- Aquila Berlas Kiani (1921–2012), Pakistani educator
- Hadiqa Kiani, Pakistani singer-songwriter, sister of Irfan
- Hossein Kiani (born 1992), Iranian football midfielder
- Iman Kiani (born 1988), Iranian football player
- Jalal Kiani (born 1989), Iranian handball player
- Jamshed Gulzar Kiani (1944–2008), Pakistan intelligence officer
- Joe Kiani (born 1965), Iranian-born American entrepreneur
- M. Z. Kiani (1910–?), an officer of the British Indian Army
- Majid Kiani, Iranian musician and researcher
- Mary Kiani (born 1969), Scottish singer
- Mehdi Kiani (footballer, born 1987), Iranian footballer
- Mehdi Kiani (footballer, born 1978), Iranian footballer
- Victor Kiani (born 2000), Swedish-American entrepreneur
