= Kayanis (musician) =

Polish musician

Kayanis is a Polish musician and composer of ambient electronic music, neo-prog and symphonic rock. His works combine the analog tone of synthesizers with electric guitars and orchestra.

Kayanis, who comes from Słupsk, Pomerania, Poland, started his music education at the age of 10 with guitar classes. His first band, Van der Krammer, unexpectedly achieved a second place award in the Science - Fiction Music Festival in Warsaw in 1988. In 1990 he began working on solo projects.

== Discography ==
- Oczekiwanie ("Awaiting") (1994)
- Machines and Dreams (1998)
- Synesthesis (2001)
- Where Abandoned Pelicans Die (2007)
