= Tabory =

Tabory may refer to:

- Tabory, Poland, a village in Pomeranian Voivodeship, Poland.
- Tabory, Russia, name of several rural localities in Russia.
- Tabory, Ukraine, a village in Baranovskiy district, Zhytomyr Oblast, Ukraine.
