= Tabory, Russia =

Tabory (Russian: Таборы) is the name of several rural localities in Russia:

- Tabory, Severodvinsk, Arkhangelsk Oblast, a village under the administrative jurisdiction of the city of oblast significance of Severodvinsk, Arkhangelsk Oblast
- Tabory, Onezhsky District, Arkhangelsk Oblast, a village in Posadny Selsoviet of Onezhsky District of Arkhangelsk Oblast
- Tabory, Vilegodsky District, Arkhangelsk Oblast, a village in Nikolsky Selsoviet of Vilegodsky District of Arkhangelsk Oblast
- Tabory, Kaluga Oblast, a village in Zhizdrinsky District of Kaluga Oblast
- Tabory, Kirov Oblast, a village in Bystritsky Rural Okrug of Orichevsky District of Kirov Oblast
- Tabory, Nizhny Novgorod Oblast, a village in Kotelnitsky Selsoviet of Chkalovsky District of Nizhny Novgorod Oblast
- Tabory, Omsk Oblast, a village in Novoyagodinsky Rural Okrug of Znamensky District of Omsk Oblast
- Tabory (selo), Dobryanka, Perm Krai, a selo under the administrative jurisdiction of the town of krai significance of Dobryanka in Perm Krai
- Tabory (settlement), Dobryanka, Perm Krai, a settlement under the administrative jurisdiction of the town of krai significance of Dobryanka in Perm Krai
- Tabory, Okhansky District, Perm Krai, a selo in Okhansky District of Perm Krai
- Tabory, Gdovsky District, Pskov Oblast, a village in Gdovsky District of Pskov Oblast
- Tabory, Kunyinsky District, Pskov Oblast, a village in Kunyinsky District of Pskov Oblast
- Tabory, Alapayevsky District, Sverdlovsk Oblast, a village in Alapayevsky District of Sverdlovsk Oblast
- Tabory, Taborinsky District, Sverdlovsk Oblast, a selo in Taborinsky District of Sverdlovsk Oblast
- Tabory, Vologda Oblast, a village in Kalininsky Selsoviet of Totemsky District of Vologda Oblast
