= Tulice Małe =

- Settlement
- Location within Poland
- Coordinates: 53°54′22″N 19°13′9″E
- Country: Poland
- Voivodeship: Pomeranian
- County: Sztum
- Gmina: Stary Targ

Tulice Małe [tuˈlit͡sɛ ˈmawɛ] is a settlement in the administrative district of Gmina Stary Targ, within Sztum County, Pomeranian Voivodeship, in northern Poland.
