= Myślice =

- Village
- Location within Poland
- Coordinates: 53°55′2″N 19°30′16″E
- Country: Poland
- Voivodeship: Pomeranian
- County: Sztum
- Gmina: Stary Dzierzgoń
- Population: 490

Myślice [mɨˈɕlit͡sɛ] is a village in the administrative district of Gmina Stary Dzierzgoń, within Sztum County, Pomeranian Voivodeship, in northern Poland.

For the history of the region, see History of Pomerania.

== Notable residents ==
- Siegfried Thomaschki (1894–1967), Generalleutnant in the German Army during World War II.

== Miswalde church ==
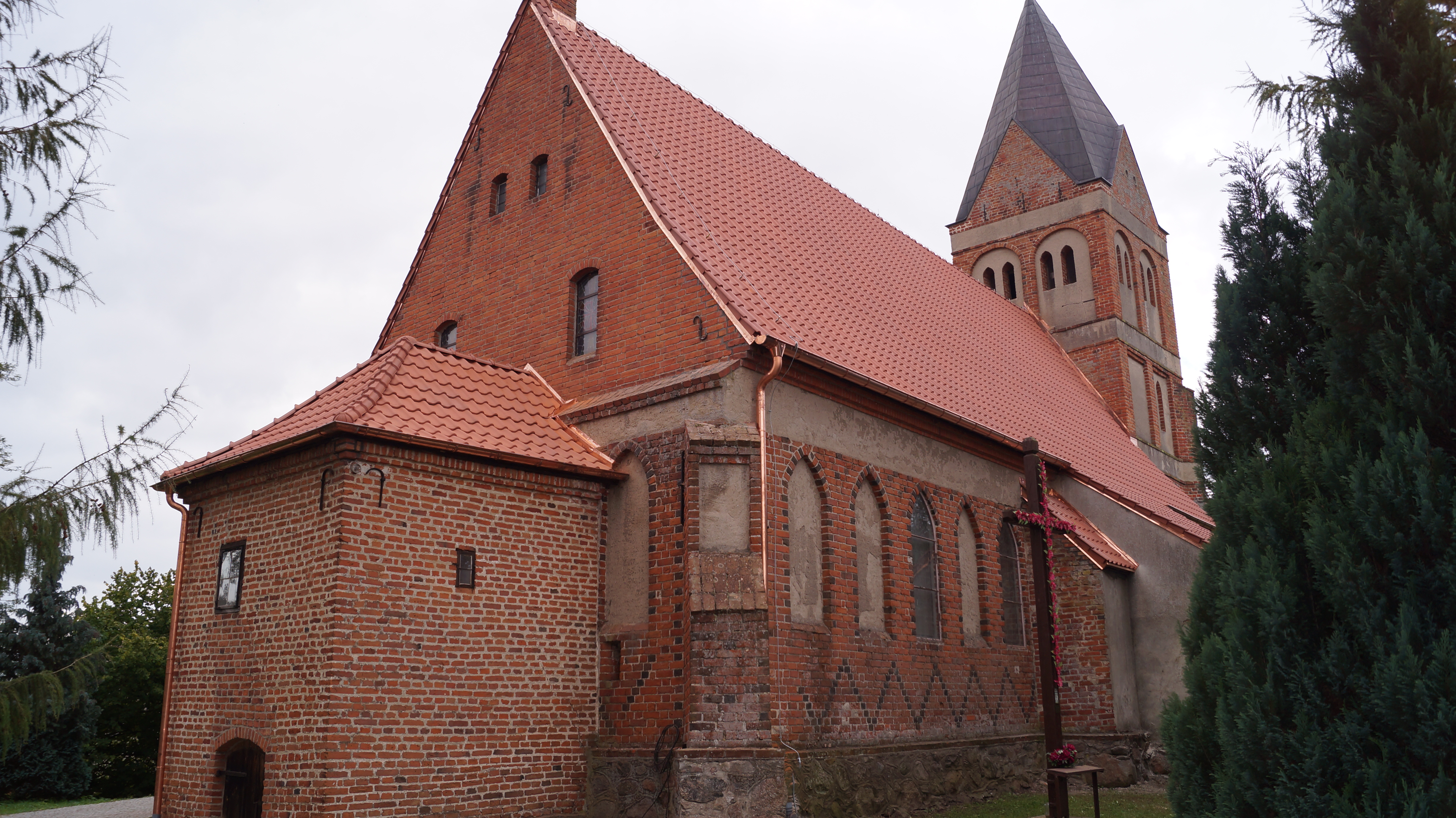
Church of the Assumption

Miswalde church dates from the second Quarter of the 14th Century and was extended in the second half of the same century. The church comprises a brick building with no chorus on a field stone base. The east gable dates from 1872 and the vestry is 19th Century. The tower is thought to date from the 15th Century and is gabled on 4 sides with an eight-sided tent roof now covered with copper plates. The church interior is largely ornamented in painted wood. Other features include: Altar from 1706, carved by David Bröse from Elblag; Pulpit from the early 18th Century; and Baptismal font made of brass, 17th Century.
