= Skolwity =

- Village
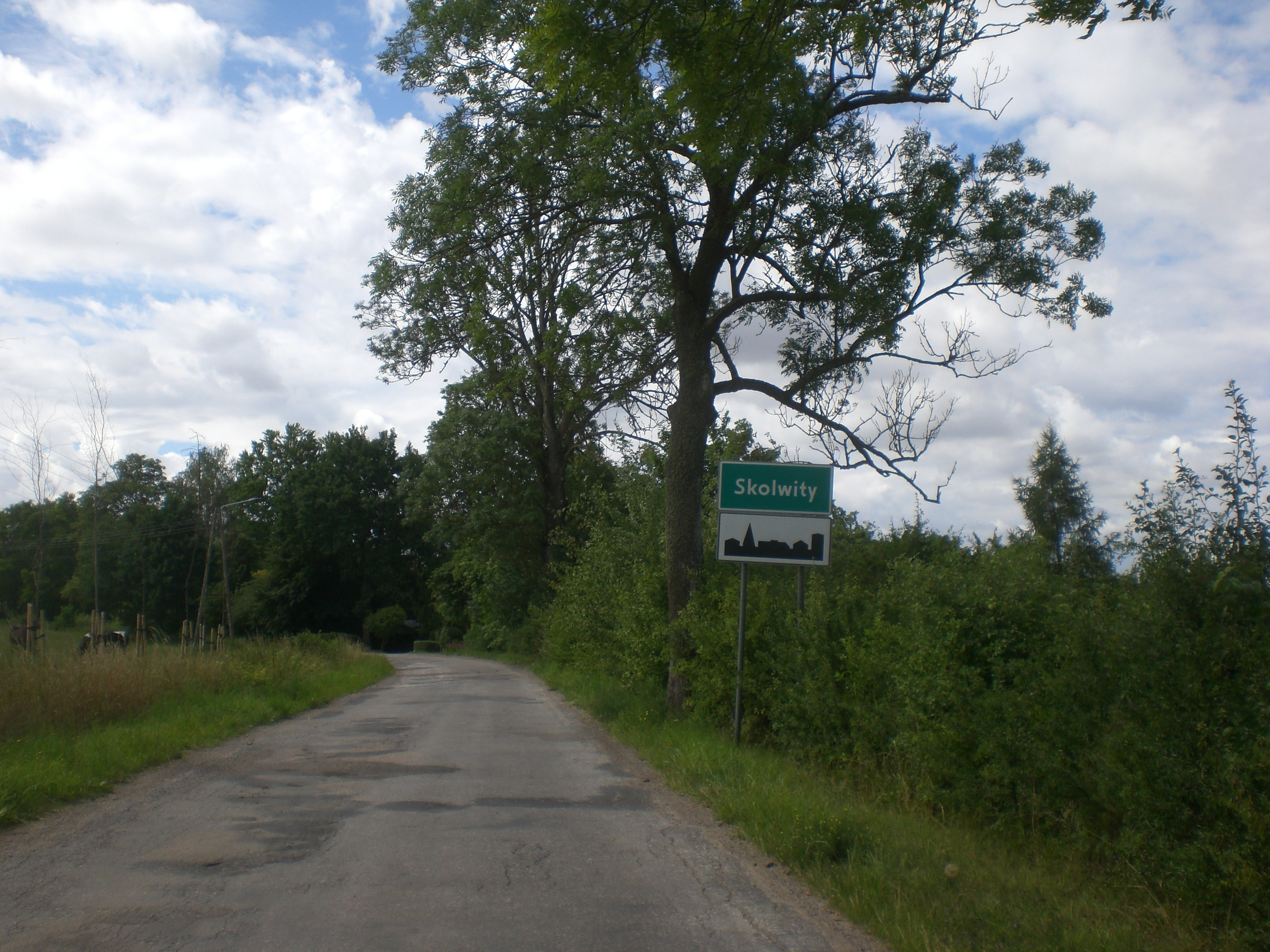

- Location within Poland
- Coordinates: 53°56′18″N 19°33′0″E
- Country: Poland
- Voivodeship: Pomeranian
- County: Sztum
- Gmina: Stary Dzierzgoń
- Population: 120

Skolwity [skɔlˈvitɨ] is a village in the administrative district of Gmina Stary Dzierzgoń, within Sztum County, Pomeranian Voivodeship, in northern Poland.
