= Szropy =

- Village
- Location within Poland
- Coordinates: 53°59′11″N 19°9′11″E
- Country: Poland
- Voivodeship: Pomeranian
- County: Sztum
- Gmina: Stary Targ
- Population: 330

Szropy ([ˈʂrɔpɨ]) (German: Schroop) is a village in the administrative district of Gmina Stary Targ, within Sztum County, Pomeranian Voivodeship, in northern Poland.

For the history of the region, see History of Pomerania.

Szropy has its own football team, Tecza, which means Rainbow in English.
