= Danielówka =

- Settlement
- Location within Poland
- Coordinates: 53°50′29″N 19°29′6″E
- Country: Poland
- Voivodeship: Pomeranian
- County: Sztum
- Gmina: Stary Dzierzgoń
- Population: 6

Danielówka [daɲɛˈlufka] is a settlement in the administrative district of Gmina Stary Dzierzgoń, within Sztum County, Pomeranian Voivodeship, in northern Poland.

For the history of the region, see History of Pomerania.
