= Lipiec =

Lipiec may refer to:

- Lipiec, Pomeranian Voivodeship, a village in northern Poland
- Polish mead made from linden honey

== People ==
- Krzysztof Lipiec (born 1959), Polish politician
- Tomasz Lipiec (born 1971), Polish race walker and politician
