= Białe Błoto, Sztum County =

Białe Błoto
- Settlement
- Location within Poland
- Coordinates: 53°48′50″N 19°23′53″E
- Country: Poland
- Voivodeship: Pomeranian
- County: Sztum
- Gmina: Stary Dzierzgoń
- Population: 14

Białe Błoto [ˈbjawɛ ˈbwɔtɔ] is a settlement in the administrative district of Gmina Stary Dzierzgoń, within Sztum County, Pomeranian Voivodeship, in northern Poland.

For the history of the region, see History of Pomerania.
