= Szropy Niziny =

- Village
- Location within Poland
- Coordinates: 54°0′29″N 19°9′41″E
- Country: Poland
- Voivodeship: Pomeranian
- County: Sztum
- Gmina: Stary Targ
- Population: 91

Szropy Niziny [ˈʂrɔpɨ niˈʑinɨ] is a village in the administrative district of Gmina Stary Targ, within Sztum County, Pomeranian Voivodeship, in northern Poland.

For the history of the region, see History of Pomerania.
