= Olszówka, Sztum County =

Olszówka
- Village
- Location within Poland
- Coordinates: 53°53′39″N 19°15′45″E
- Country: Poland
- Voivodeship: Pomeranian
- County: Sztum
- Gmina: Stary Targ
- Population: 50

Olszówka [ɔlˈʂufka] is a village in the administrative district of Gmina Stary Targ, within Sztum County, Pomeranian Voivodeship, in northern Poland.

== See also ==
- History of Pomerania
