= Łabuń, Pomeranian Voivodeship =

Łabuń
- Village
- Location within Poland
- Coordinates: 53°58′10″N 19°7′34″E
- Country: Poland
- Voivodeship: Pomeranian
- County: Sztum
- Gmina: Stary Targ

Łabuń (Polish pronunciation: [ˈwabuj̃]) is a village in the administrative district of Gmina Stary Targ, within Sztum County, Pomeranian Voivodeship, in northern Poland.

== See also ==
- History of Pomerania
