= Waplewko =

- Village
- Location within Poland
- Coordinates: 53°55′17″N 19°15′30″E
- Country: Poland
- Voivodeship: Pomeranian
- County: Sztum
- Gmina: Stary Targ

Waplewko [vaˈplɛfkɔ] (German: Klein Waplitz) is a village in the administrative district of Gmina Stary Targ, within Sztum County, Pomeranian Voivodeship, in northern Poland.
