= Ramoty, Pomeranian Voivodeship =

Ramoty
- Village
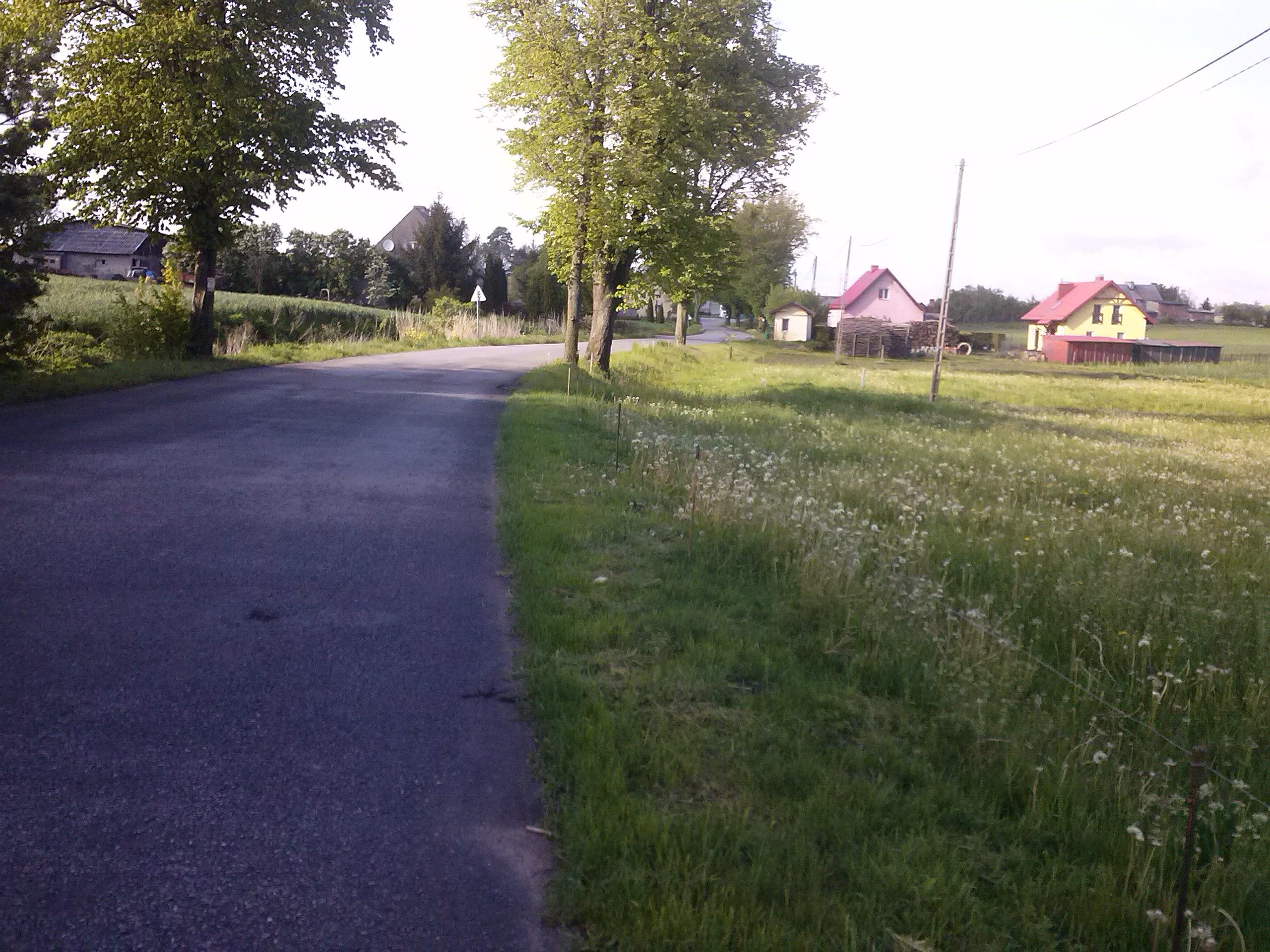

- Location within Poland
- Coordinates: 53°56′37″N 19°14′9″E
- Country: Poland
- Voivodeship: Pomeranian
- County: Sztum
- Gmina: Stary Targ

Population
  - Total: 100
- Time zone: UTC+1 (CET)
  - Summer (DST): UTC+2 (CEST)
- Vehicle registration: GSZ

Ramoty [raˈmɔtɨ] is a village in the administrative district of Gmina Stary Targ, within Sztum County, Pomeranian Voivodeship, in northern Poland. It is located in the region of Powiśle.

It was a private village of Polish nobility, including the Bagniewski family until 1772, and the Sierakowski family in the later period.

== Demographics ==
Historical population
| Year | Pop. | ±% |
|---|---|---|
| 1868 | 250 | — |
| 1885 | 213 | −14.8% |
