= Pozolia =

- Village
- Location within Poland
- Coordinates: 53°59′14″N 19°14′39″E
- Country: Poland
- Voivodeship: Pomeranian
- County: Sztum
- Gmina: Stary Targ

Pozolia [pɔˈzɔlja] is a village in the administrative district of Gmina Stary Targ, within Sztum County, Pomeranian Voivodeship, in northern Poland.

== See also ==
- History of Pomerania
