= Gintro =

- Village
- Location within Poland
- Coordinates: 53°57′56″N 19°8′55″E
- Country: Poland
- Voivodeship: Pomeranian
- County: Sztum
- Gmina: Stary Targ
- Population: 40

Gintro ([ˈɡintrɔ]) (German: Gunter) is a village in the administrative district of Gmina Stary Targ, within Sztum County, Pomeranian Voivodeship, in northern Poland.

== See also ==
- History of Pomerania
