= Stare Miasto, Pomeranian Voivodeship =

Stare Miasto
- Village
- Location within Poland
- Coordinates: 53°53′9″N 19°22′1″E
- Country: Poland
- Voivodeship: Pomeranian
- County: Sztum
- Gmina: Stary Dzierzgoń
- Population: 290

Stare Miasto (Polish: [ˈstarɛ ˈmjastɔ]) is a village in the administrative district of Gmina Stary Dzierzgoń, within Sztum County, Pomeranian Voivodeship, in northern Poland.

For the history of the region, see History of Pomerania.

== Historic St. Peter's and St. Paul's church ==
This church was built in the late 15th century. The oldest cornerstone shows 1495 or 1496. The wooden ceiling and pews are painted in the late baroque style.

The pipe organ was built 1796 and restored and expanded 1866. The elaborate organ case survived the war damages 1945. All organ pipes, however disappeared. The mechanism of the organ fell into disrepair.
