= Dziewięć Włók =

Dziewięć Włók may refer to the following places in Poland:

- Dziewięć Włók, Gdańsk County
- Dziewięć Włók, Sztum County
