= Górki, Gmina Stary Dzierzgoń =

Górki
- Village
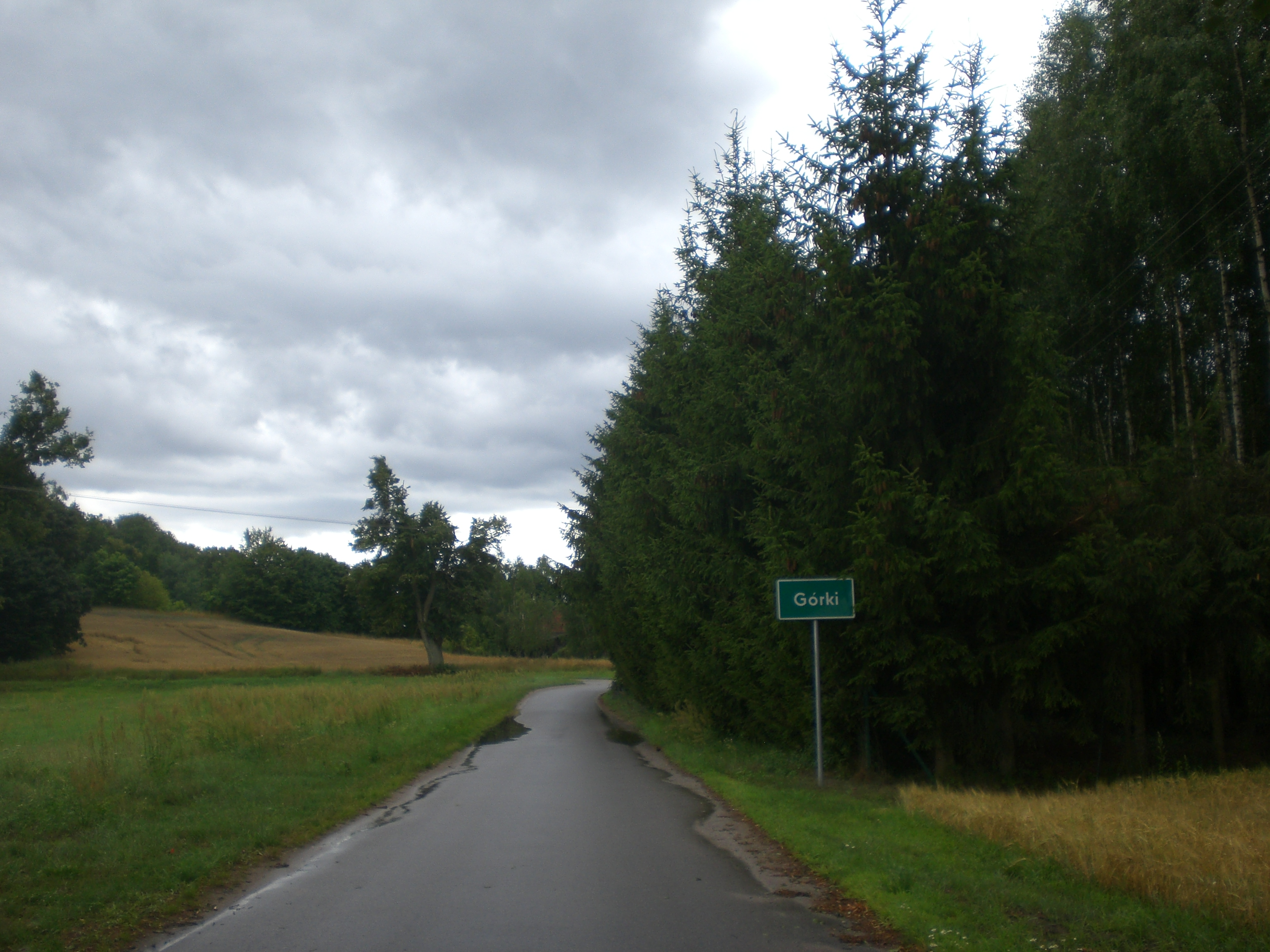

- Location within Poland
- Coordinates: 53°49′19″N 19°20′37″E
- Country: Poland
- Voivodeship: Pomeranian
- County: Sztum
- Gmina: Stary Dzierzgoń
- Population: 120

Górki [ˈɡurki] is a village in the administrative district of Gmina Stary Dzierzgoń, within Sztum County, Pomeranian Voivodeship, in northern Poland.

For the history of the region, see History of Pomerania.
