= Bartne Łąki =

- Settlement
- Location within Poland
- Coordinates: 53°49′28″N 19°23′35″E
- Country: Poland
- Voivodeship: Pomeranian
- County: Sztum
- Gmina: Stary Dzierzgoń

Bartne Łąki (Polish pronunciation: [ˈbartnɛ ˈwɔŋkʲi]) is a settlement in the administrative district of Gmina Stary Dzierzgoń, within Sztum County, Pomeranian Voivodeship, in northern Poland.

For the history of the region, see History of Pomerania.
