= Stary Dwór, Sztum County =

Stary Dwór
- Village
- Location within Poland
- Coordinates: 53°55′54″N 19°10′40″E
- Country: Poland
- Voivodeship: Pomeranian
- County: Sztum
- Gmina: Stary Targ

Stary Dwór ([ˈstarɨ ˈdvur]) (German: Volwerk Altmarck) is a village in the administrative district of Gmina Stary Targ, within Sztum County, Pomeranian Voivodeship, in northern Poland.

For the history of the region, see History of Pomerania.
