= Popity =

- Village
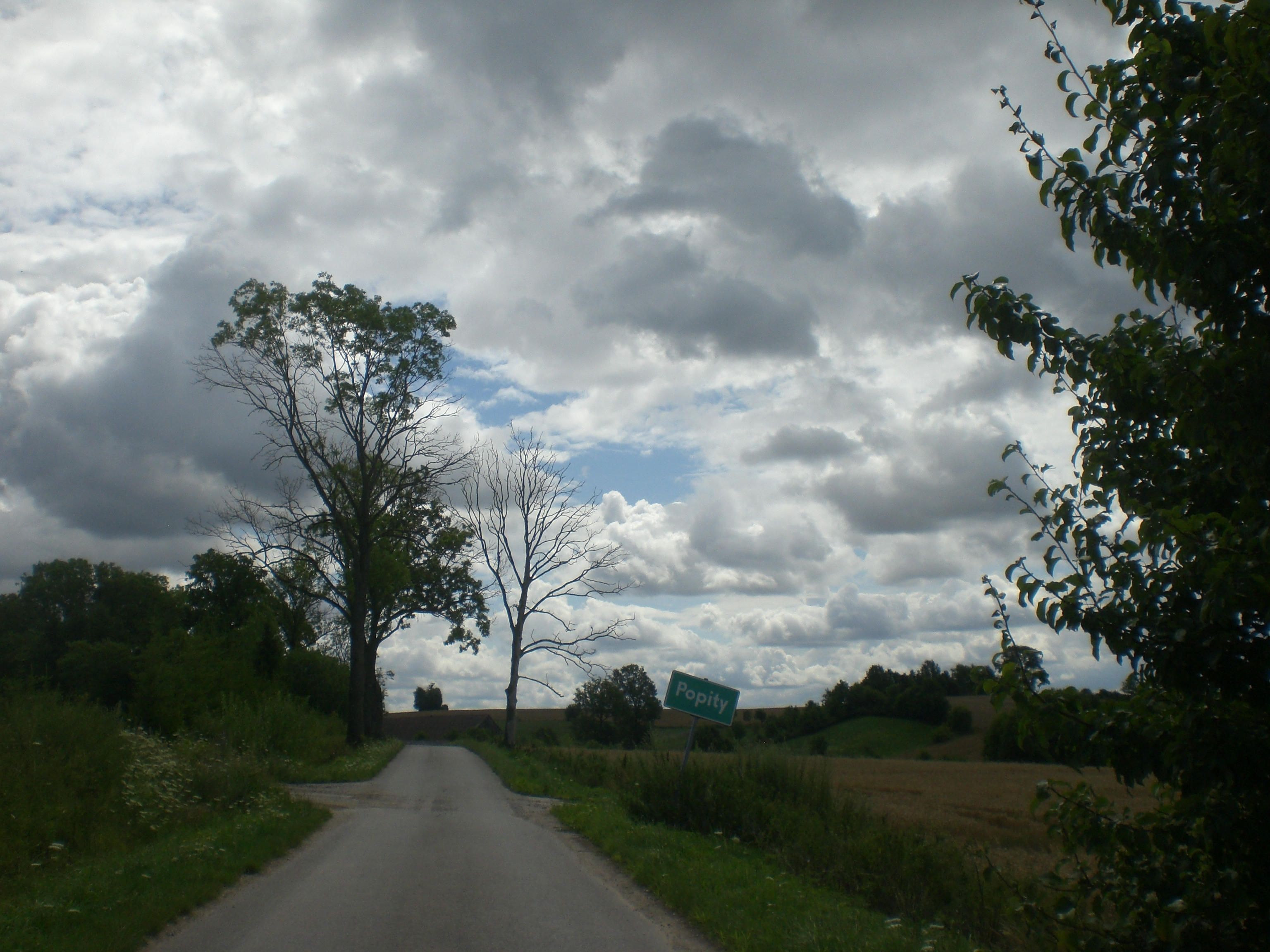

- Location within Poland
- Coordinates: 53°56′4″N 19°33′31″E
- Country: Poland
- Voivodeship: Pomeranian
- County: Sztum
- Gmina: Stary Dzierzgoń
- Population: 45

Popity [pɔˈpitɨ] is a village in the administrative district of Gmina Stary Dzierzgoń, within Sztum County, Pomeranian Voivodeship, in northern Poland.

For the history of the region, see History of Pomerania.
