= Kalwa, Pomeranian Voivodeship =

Kalwa
- Village
- Location within Poland
- Coordinates: 53°56′59″N 19°8′33″E
- Country: Poland
- Voivodeship: Pomeranian
- County: Sztum
- Gmina: Stary Targ
- Population: 232

Kalwa [ˈkalva] is a village in the administrative district of Gmina Stary Targ, within Sztum County, Pomeranian Voivodeship, in northern Poland.
