= Malewo, Pomeranian Voivodeship =

Malewo
- Village
- Location within Poland
- Coordinates: 54°0′51″N 19°6′51″E
- Country: Poland
- Voivodeship: Pomeranian
- County: Sztum
- Gmina: Stary Targ

Malewo [maˈlɛvɔ] is a village in the administrative district of Gmina Stary Targ, within Sztum County, Pomeranian Voivodeship, in northern Poland.

== See also ==
- History of Pomerania
