= Kołtyniany, Pomeranian Voivodeship =

Kołtyniany
- Village
- Location within Poland
- Coordinates: 53°55′25″N 19°27′1″E
- Country: Poland
- Voivodeship: Pomeranian
- County: Sztum
- Gmina: Stary Dzierzgoń
- Population: 50

Kołtyniany [kɔu̯tɨˈɲanɨ] is a village in the administrative district of Gmina Stary Dzierzgoń, within Sztum County, Pomeranian Voivodeship, in northern Poland.

For the history of the region, see History of Pomerania.
