= Pogorzele, Sztum County =

Pogorzele
- Village
- Location within Poland
- Coordinates: 53°55′3″N 19°24′22″E
- Country: Poland
- Voivodeship: Pomeranian
- County: Sztum
- Gmina: Stary Dzierzgoń
- Population: 25

Pogorzele [pɔɡɔˈʐɛlɛ] is a village in the administrative district of Gmina Stary Dzierzgoń, within Sztum County, Pomeranian Voivodeship, in northern Poland.

For the history of the region, see History of Pomerania.
