= Brzozówka, Pomeranian Voivodeship =

Brzozówka
- Village
- Location within Poland
- Coordinates: 53°56′52″N 19°12′51″E
- Country: Poland
- Voivodeship: Pomeranian
- County: Sztum
- Gmina: Stary Targ

Brzozówka ([bʐɔˈzufka]) (German: Birkendorf) is a village in the administrative district of Gmina Stary Targ, within Sztum County, Pomeranian Voivodeship, in northern Poland.

== See also ==
- History of Pomerania
