= Czerwony Dwór, Pomeranian Voivodeship =

Czerwony Dwór
- Village
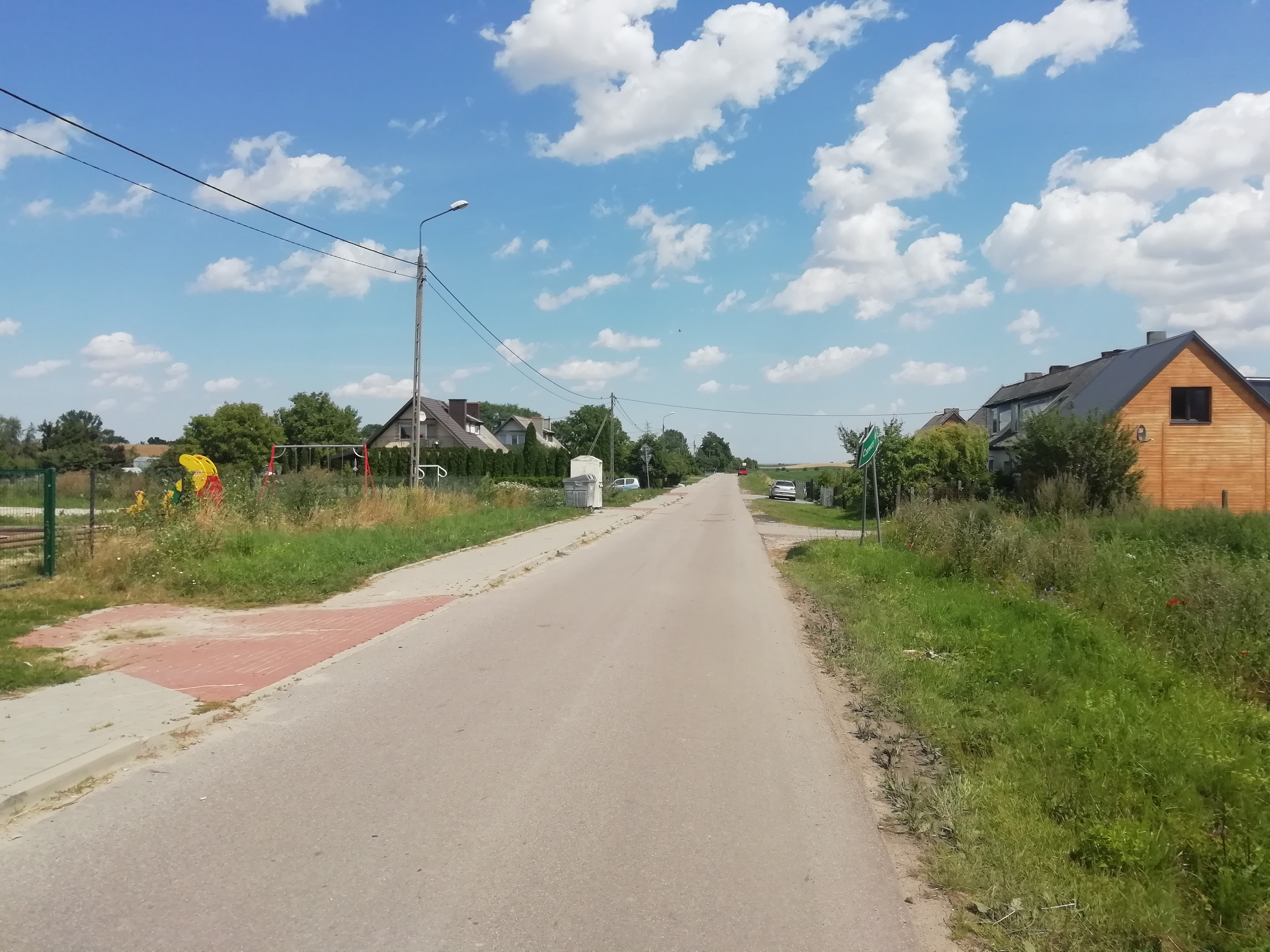

- Location within Poland
- Coordinates: 53°59′42″N 19°6′22″E
- Country: Poland
- Voivodeship: Pomeranian
- County: Sztum
- Gmina: Stary Targ
- Time zone: UTC+1 (CET)
  - Summer (DST): UTC+2 (CEST)
- Vehicle registration: GSZ

Czerwony Dwór ([t͡ʂɛrˈvɔnɨ ˈdvur]) (German: Rothhof) is a village in the administrative district of Gmina Stary Targ, within Sztum County, Pomeranian Voivodeship, in northern Poland. It is located in the region of Powiśle.

It was a private village of the Przeszmiński family, administratively located in the Malbork Voivodeship of the Kingdom of Poland.

Historical population
Year	Pop.	±%
1868	43	—
1885	52	+20.9%
