= Zamek =

Zamek (the Polish word for "castle") may refer to:

- Zamek, popular name for the palace called the Imperial Castle in Poznań
- Zamek, Pomeranian Voivodeship, a village in northern Poland
- Zamek, West Pomeranian Voivodeship, a village in north-western Poland
