= Pronie =

- Village
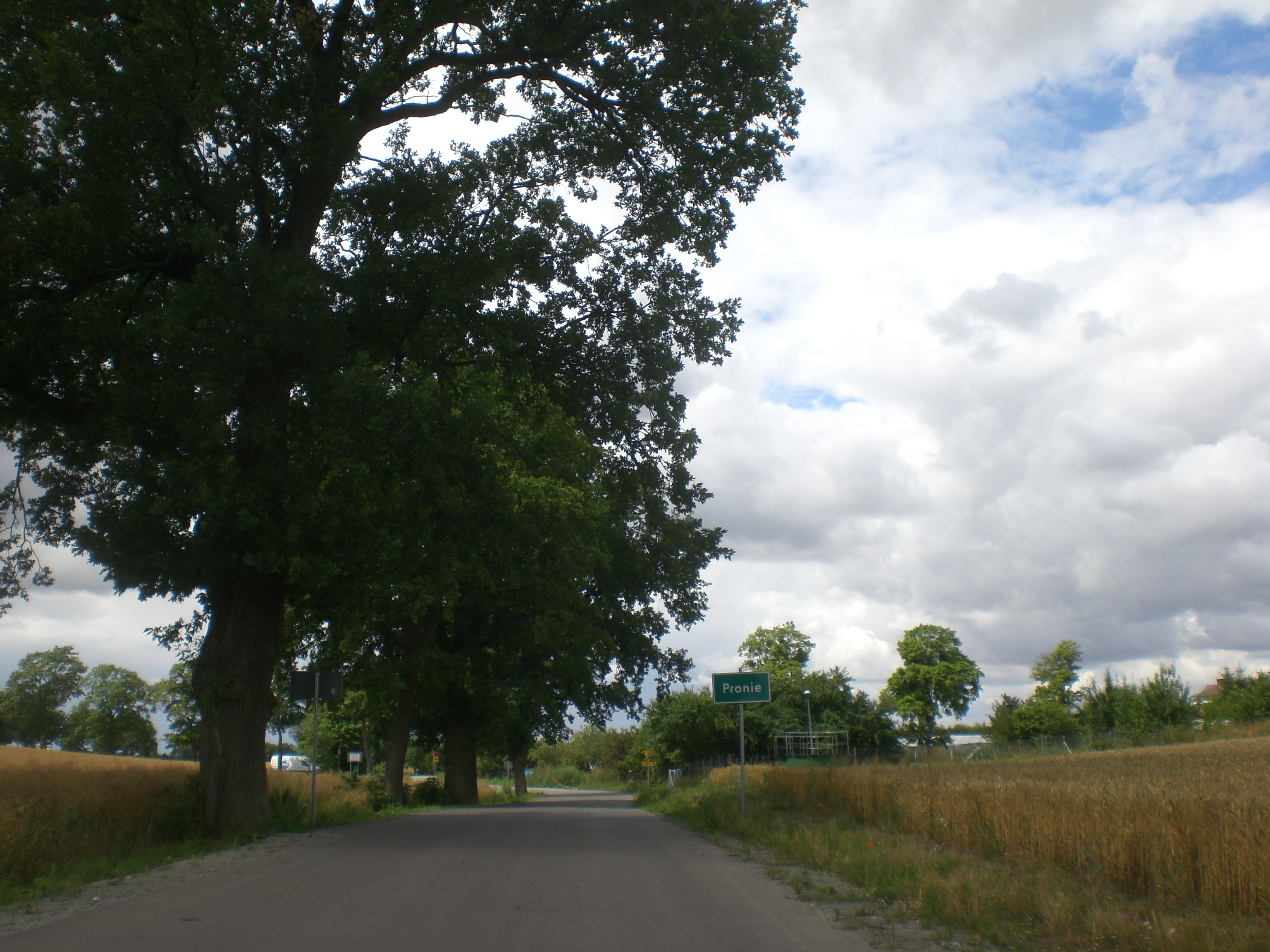
- Entrance to the village

- Location within Poland
- Coordinates: 53°53′54″N 19°29′58″E
- Country: Poland
- Voivodeship: Pomeranian
- County: Sztum
- Gmina: Stary Dzierzgoń

Population
  - Total: 160
- Time zone: UTC+1 (CET)
  - Summer (DST): UTC+2 (CEST)
- Vehicle registration: GSZ

Pronie [ˈprɔɲɛ] is a village in the administrative district of Gmina Stary Dzierzgoń, within Sztum County, Pomeranian Voivodeship, in northern Poland. It is located in the region of Powiśle.

== History ==
Pronie was a farm with about 285 ha, first noted in documents of the Grand Master of the Teutonic Order in Malbork at 1320.

The Modrzycki Polish noble family lived in the village.

At the end of World War II, the village was a well-functioning farm with 200 head of dairy cows, a substantial stock of Trakehnen horses, Merino sheep and swine production. The farm was only possible to exist and function because of its capable workforce of 18 families that had a good and rewarding life on this estate. Eighteen members of this estate lost their lives in World War II or were taken to Russia. The owners stayed in or around Pronie until August 1945, when they were asked to leave Poland.
