= Pijaki =

- Settlement
- Location within Poland
- Coordinates: 53°58′53″N 19°5′47″E
- Country: Poland
- Voivodeship: Pomeranian
- County: Sztum
- Gmina: Stary Targ

Pijaki [piˈjaki] is a settlement in the administrative district of Gmina Stary Targ, within Sztum County, Pomeranian Voivodeship, in northern Poland.

For the history of the region, see History of Pomerania.
