= Jurkowice, Pomeranian Voivodeship =

Village in Pomeranian Voivodeship, Poland

Jurkowice
- Village
- Location within Poland
- Coordinates: 53°57′35″N 19°7′58″E
- Country: Poland
- Voivodeship: Pomeranian
- County: Sztum
- Gmina: Stary Targ
- Population: 390

Jurkowice [jurkɔˈvit͡sɛ] is a village in the administrative district of Gmina Stary Targ, within Sztum County, Pomeranian Voivodeship, in northern Poland.

== See also ==
- History of Pomerania
