= Milikowo =

- Village
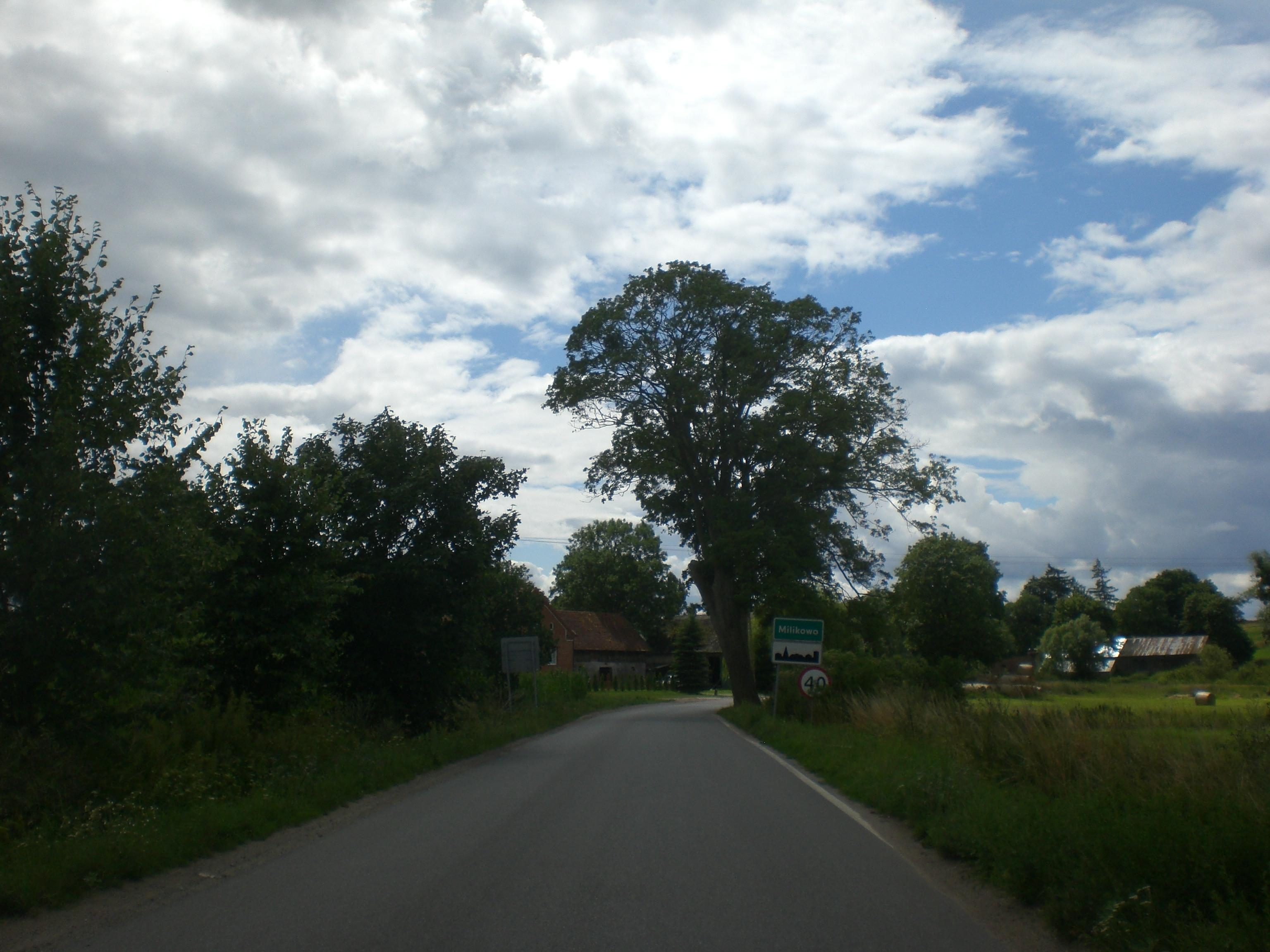

- Location within Poland
- Coordinates: 53°52′37″N 19°29′16″E
- Country: Poland
- Voivodeship: Pomeranian
- County: Sztum
- Gmina: Stary Dzierzgoń
- Population: 130
- Postal code: 82-450

Milikowo [miliˈkɔvɔ] is a village in the administrative district of Gmina Stary Dzierzgoń, within Sztum County, Pomeranian Voivodeship, in northern Poland.

== History ==
The settlement was founded during medieval Ostsiedlung by a lokator named Heinrich, who probably came from Silesia, and hence the village was named Heinrichsdorf.
