= Bądze, Pomeranian Voivodeship =

Bądze
- Village
- Location within Poland
- Coordinates: 53°47′50″N 19°27′44″E
- Country: Poland
- Voivodeship: Pomeranian
- County: Sztum
- Gmina: Stary Dzierzgoń
- Population: 60

Bądze [ˈbɔnd͡zɛ] is a village in the administrative district of Gmina Stary Dzierzgoń, within Sztum County, Pomeranian Voivodeship, in northern Poland.

For the history of the region, see History of Pomerania.
