= Mortąg =

- Village
- Location within Poland
- Coordinates: 53°49′25″N 19°26′9″E
- Country: Poland
- Voivodeship: Pomeranian
- County: Sztum
- Gmina: Stary Dzierzgoń
- Population: 220

Mortąg [ˈmɔrtɔnk] is a village in the administrative district of Gmina Stary Dzierzgoń, within Sztum County, Pomeranian Voivodeship, in northern Poland.
