= Królikowo =

Królikowo may refer to the following places:

- Królikowo, Kuyavian-Pomeranian Voivodeship (north-central Poland)
- Królikowo, Pomeranian Voivodeship (north Poland)
- Królikowo, Warmian-Masurian Voivodeship (north Poland)
