= Dąbrówka Malborska =

- Village
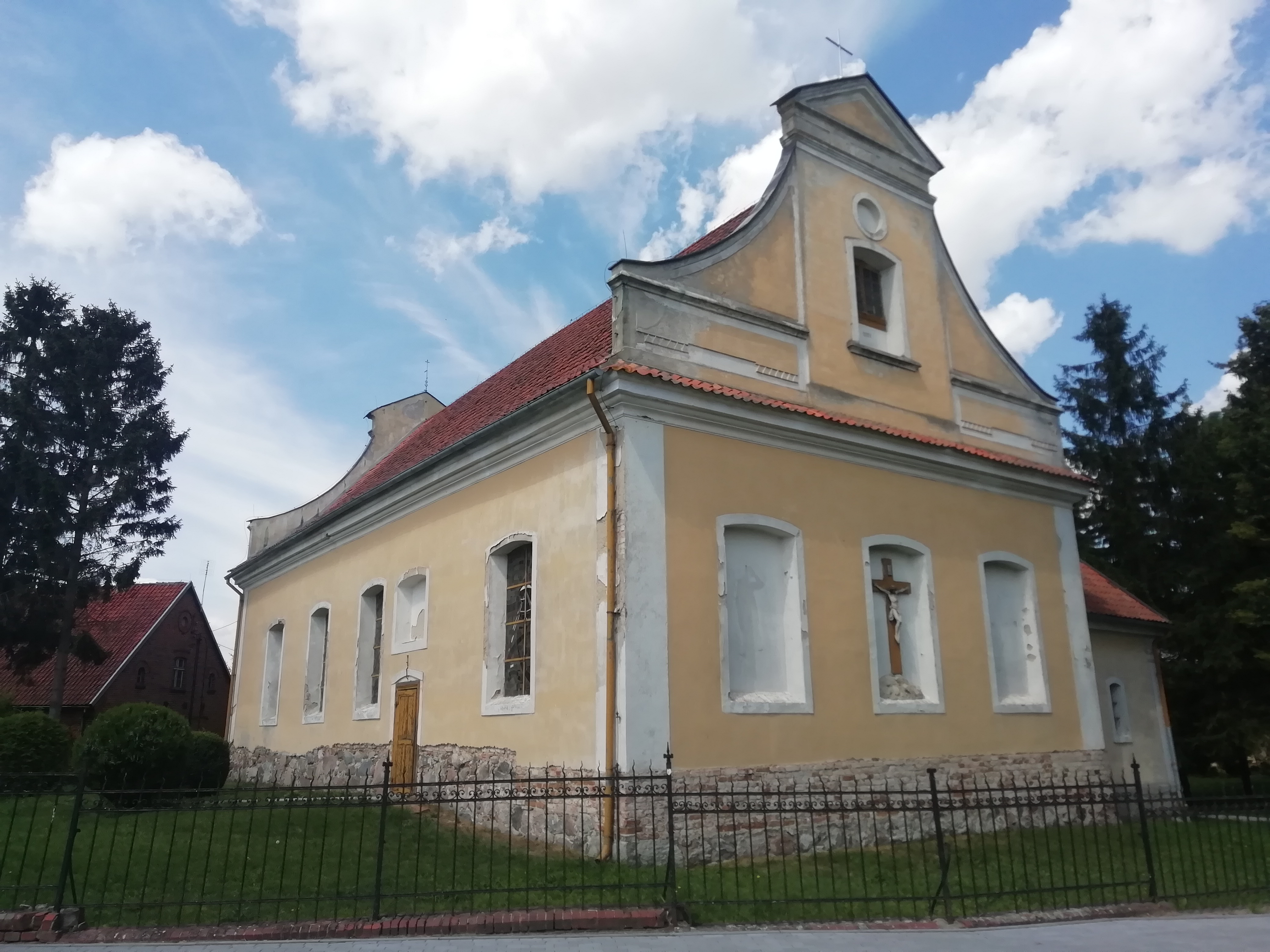
- Church of Saint Nicholas

- Location within Poland
- Coordinates: 53°59′15″N 19°5′24″E
- Country: Poland
- Voivodeship: Pomeranian
- County: Sztum
- Gmina: Stary Targ

Population
  - Total: 380

Dąbrówka Malborska ([dɔmˈbrufka malˈbɔrska]) (German: Deutsch Damerau) is a village in the administrative district of Gmina Stary Targ, within Sztum County, Pomeranian Voivodeship, in northern Poland.
