= Bucznik =

Bucznik may refer to the following places in Poland:

- Bucznik, Pomeranian Voivodeship
- Bucznik, West Pomeranian Voivodeship
