= Bukowo, Sztum County =

Bukowo
- Village
- Location within Poland
- Coordinates: 53°58′27″N 19°12′29″E
- Country: Poland
- Voivodeship: Pomeranian
- County: Sztum
- Gmina: Stary Targ
- Population: 190

Bukowo ([buˈkɔvɔ]) (German: Buchwalde) is a village in the administrative district of Gmina Stary Targ, within Sztum County, Pomeranian Voivodeship, in northern Poland.

== See also ==
- History of Pomerania
