= Kielmy, Pomeranian Voivodeship =

Kielmy
- Village
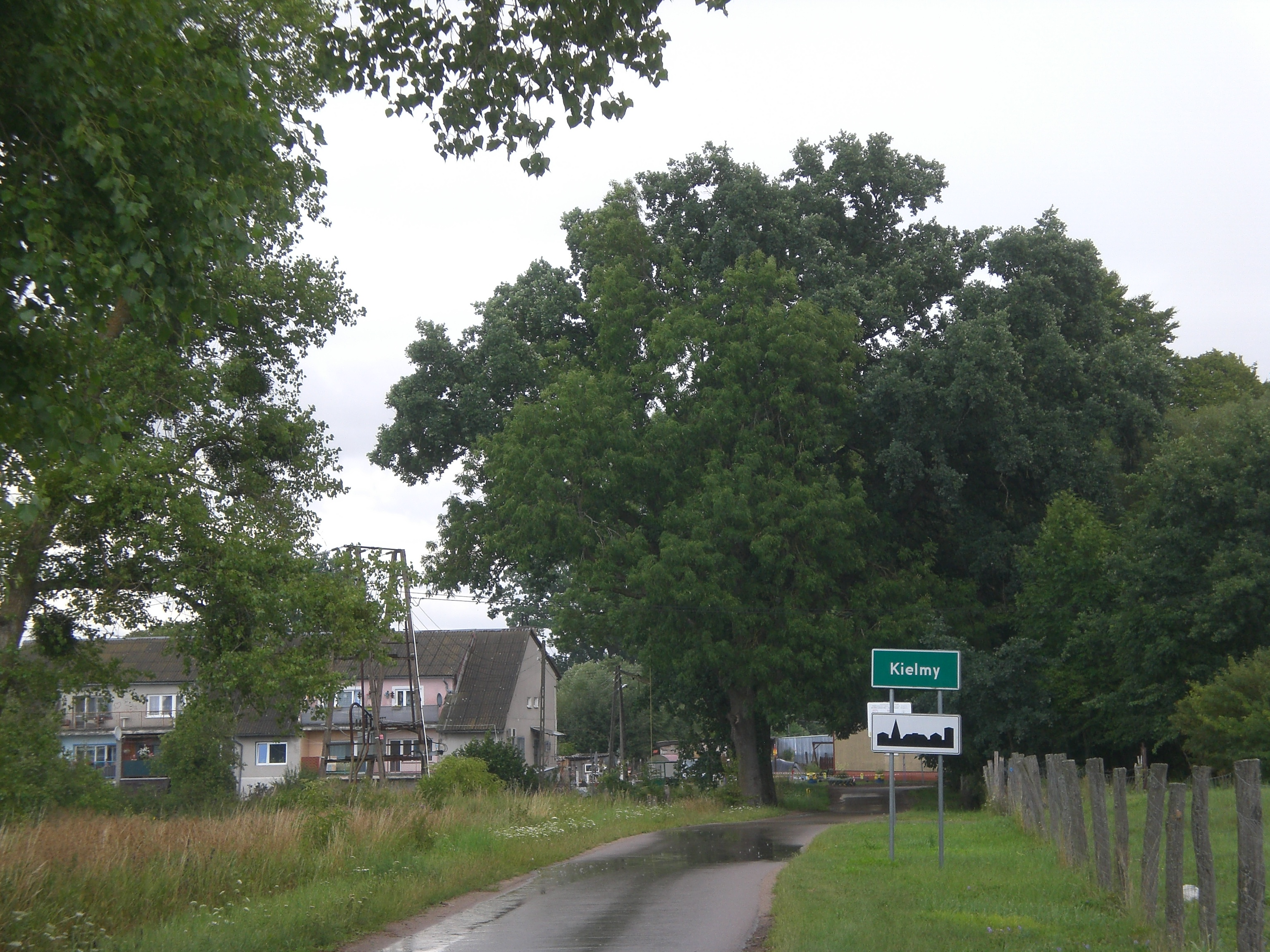

- Location within Poland
- Coordinates: 53°53′0″N 19°24′12″E
- Country: Poland
- Voivodeship: Pomeranian
- County: Sztum
- Gmina: Stary Dzierzgoń
- Population: 110

Kielmy [ˈkʲɛlmɨ] is a village in the administrative district of Gmina Stary Dzierzgoń, within Sztum County, Pomeranian Voivodeship, in northern Poland.

For the history of the region, see History of Pomerania.
