= Kątki, Pomeranian Voivodeship =

Kątki
- Village
- Location within Poland
- Coordinates: 53°54′26″N 19°9′9″E
- Country: Poland
- Voivodeship: Pomeranian
- County: Sztum
- Gmina: Stary Targ
- Population: 110

Kątki [ˈkɔntki] is a village in the administrative district of Gmina Stary Targ, within Sztum County, Pomeranian Voivodeship, in northern Poland.

== See also ==
- History of Pomerania
