= Latkowo =

Latkowo may refer to the following places:

- Latkowo, Inowrocław County in Kuyavian-Pomeranian Voivodeship (north-central Poland)
- Latkowo, Radziejów County in Kuyavian-Pomeranian Voivodeship (north-central Poland)
- Latkowo, Pomeranian Voivodeship (north Poland)
