= Przezmark, Pomeranian Voivodeship =

Przezmark
- Village
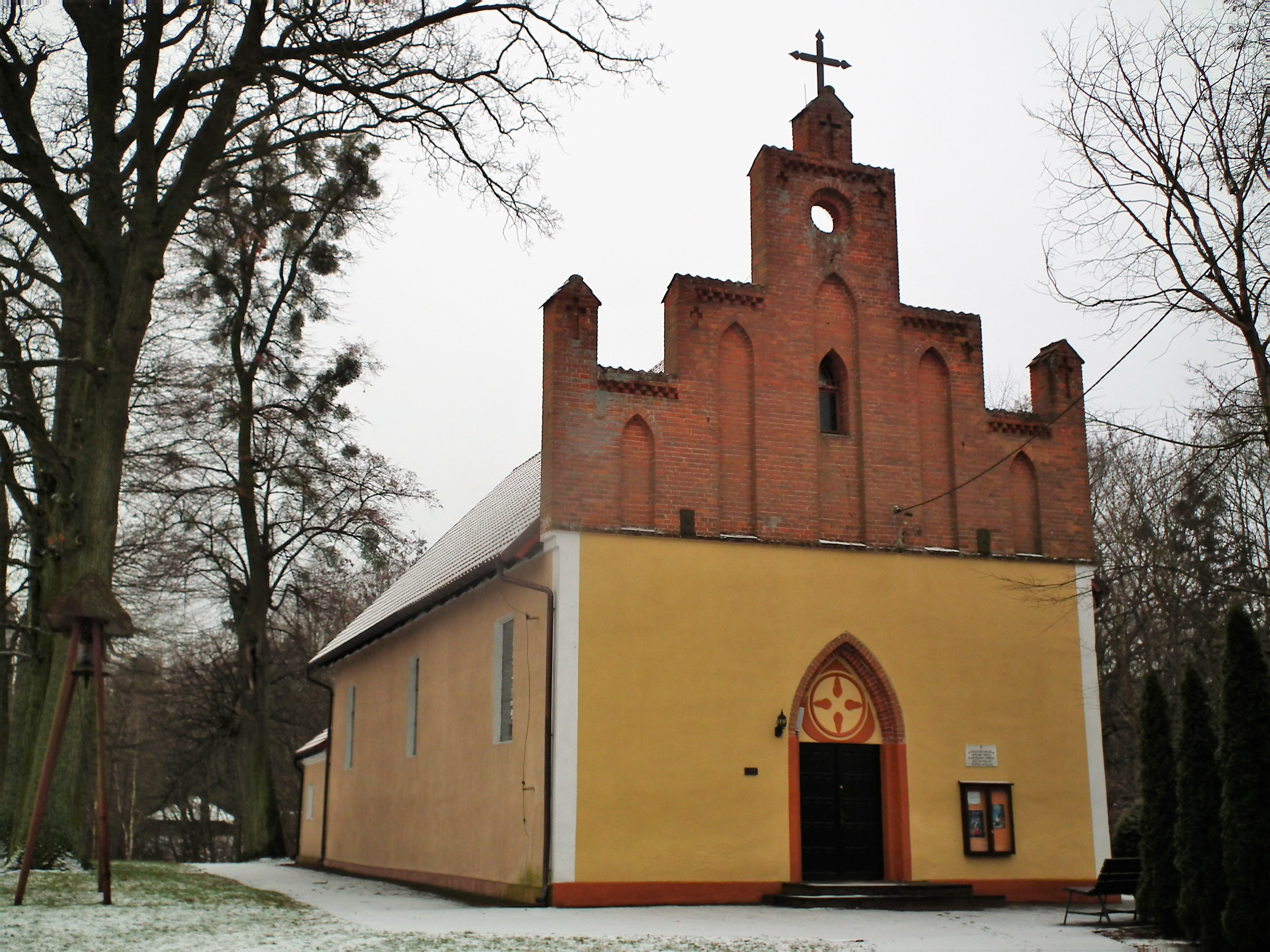
- Regina Mundi church in Przezmark

- Location within Poland
- Coordinates: 53°51′44″N 19°29′30″E
- Country: Poland
- Voivodeship: Pomeranian
- County: Sztum
- Gmina: Stary Dzierzgoń
- Population: 450
- Time zone: UTC+1 (CET)
  - Summer (DST): UTC+2 (CEST)
- Vehicle registration: GSZ

Przezmark [ˈpʂɛzmark] is a village in the administrative district of Gmina Stary Dzierzgoń, within Sztum County, Pomeranian Voivodeship, in northern Poland. It is situated on the northern shore of Lake Motława Wielka.

In October–November 1831, several Polish infantry units of the November Uprising stopped in the village on the way to their internment places.
