= Klecewo, Sztum County =

Klecewo
- Village
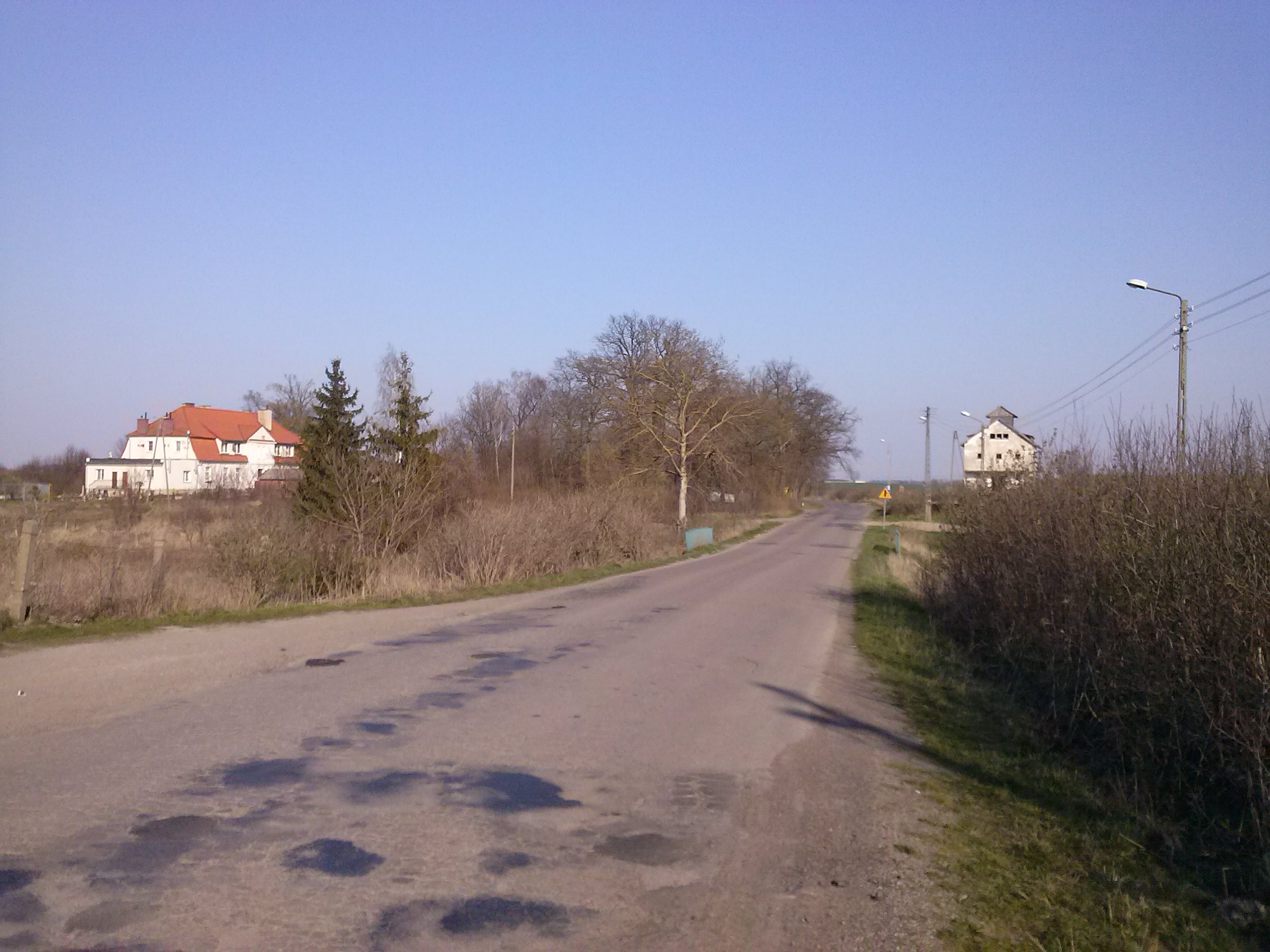

- Location within Poland
- Coordinates: 53°55′6″N 19°7′54″E
- Country: Poland
- Voivodeship: Pomeranian
- County: Sztum
- Gmina: Stary Targ
- Founded: c. 1336

Population
  - Total: 100
- Time zone: UTC+1 (CET)
  - Summer (DST): UTC+2 (CEST)

Klecewo [klɛˈt͡sɛvɔ] is a village in the administrative district of Gmina Stary Targ, within Sztum County, Pomeranian Voivodeship, in northern Poland. It is located in the region of Powiśle.

The village was founded in c. 1336.
