= Zielonki, Pomeranian Voivodeship =

Zielonki
- Village
- Location within Poland
- Coordinates: 53°58′35″N 19°9′44″E
- Country: Poland
- Voivodeship: Pomeranian
- County: Sztum
- Gmina: Stary Targ
- Population: 690

Zielonki [ʑɛˈlɔnki] is a village in the administrative district of Gmina Stary Targ, within Sztum County, Pomeranian Voivodeship, in northern Poland.

For the history of the region, see History of Pomerania.
