= Piaski Morąskie =

- Village
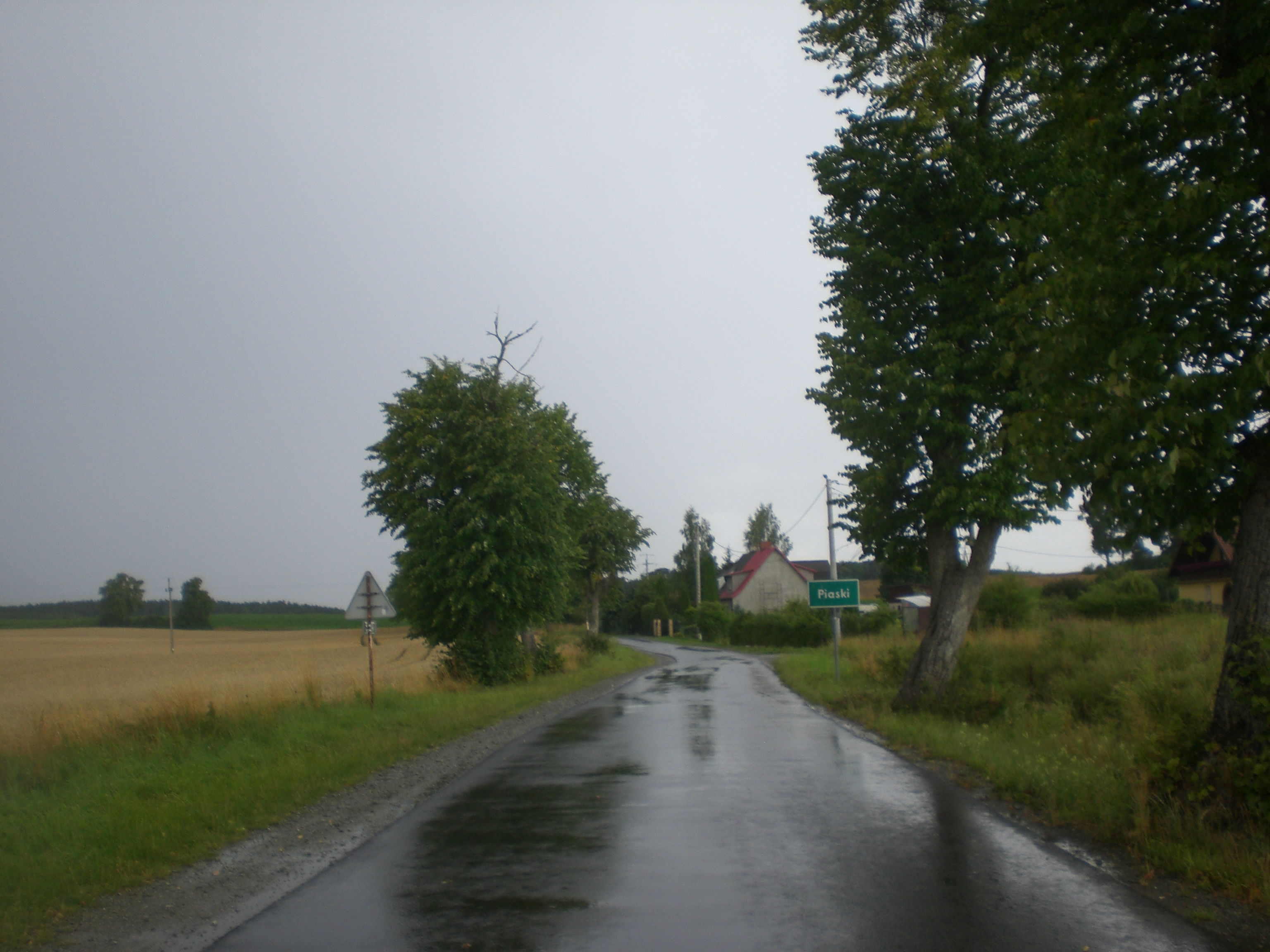

- Location within Poland
- Coordinates: 53°50′19″N 19°22′39″E
- Country: Poland
- Voivodeship: Pomeranian
- County: Sztum
- Gmina: Stary Dzierzgoń
- Population: 30

Piaski Morąskie (Polish pronunciation: [ˈpjaskʲi mɔˈrɔ̃skʲɛ]) is a village in the administrative district of Gmina Stary Dzierzgoń, within Sztum County, Pomeranian Voivodeship, in northern Poland.

For the history of the region, see History of Pomerania.
