= Kornele =

- Village
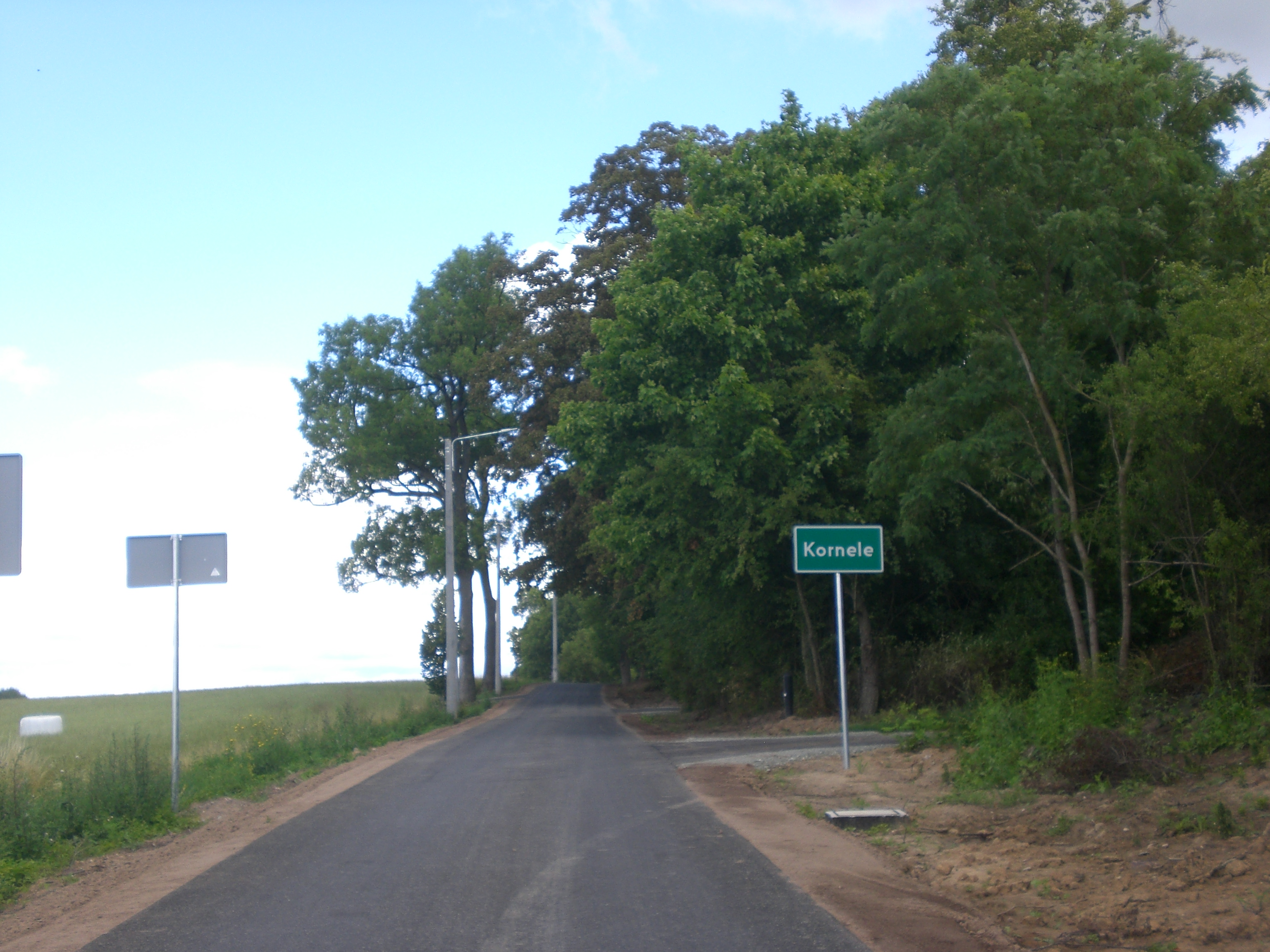
- Entrance to Kornele

- Location within Poland
- Coordinates: 53°54′54″N 19°32′46″E
- Country: Poland
- Voivodeship: Pomeranian
- County: Sztum
- Gmina: Stary Dzierzgoń

Population
  - Total: 80
- Time zone: UTC+1 (CET)
  - Summer (DST): UTC+2 (CEST)
- Vehicle registration: GSZ

Kornele [kɔrˈnɛlɛ] is a village in the administrative district of Gmina Stary Dzierzgoń, within Sztum County, Pomeranian Voivodeship, in northern Poland. It is located in the region of Powiśle.

The Radomski Polish noble family lived in the village.
