= Najatki =

- Settlement
- Location within Poland
- Coordinates: 53°54′50″N 19°28′54″E
- Country: Poland
- Voivodeship: Pomeranian
- County: Sztum
- Gmina: Stary Dzierzgoń
- Population: 11

Najatki [naˈjatki] is a settlement in the administrative district of Gmina Stary Dzierzgoń, within Sztum County, Pomeranian Voivodeship, in northern Poland.

For the history of the region, see History of Pomerania.
