= Osiewo =

- Settlement
- Location within Poland
- Coordinates: 53°59′49″N 19°7′13″E
- Country: Poland
- Voivodeship: Pomeranian
- County: Sztum
- Gmina: Stary Targ

Osiewo [ɔˈɕɛvɔ] is a settlement in the administrative district of Gmina Stary Targ, within Sztum County, Pomeranian Voivodeship, in northern Poland.

== See also ==
- History of Pomerania
