= Birkenfeld (disambiguation) =

Birkenfeld is a town in Rhineland-Palatinate, Germany.

Birkenfeld (lit. "birch field") may also refer to:

- Birkenfeld (district), a district in Rhineland-Palatinate
- Birkenfeld (Verbandsgemeinde), a Verbandsgemeinde in Rhineland-Palatinate
- Principality of Birkenfeld, later the Region of Birkenfeld, a former exclave of the Grand Duchy and Free State of Oldenburg centred on the town in modern Rhineland-Palatinate
- Birkenfeld, Bavaria, a municipality in Bavaria, Germany
- Birkenfeld (Enz), a municipality in Baden-Württemberg, Germany
- Birkenfeld, Oregon, an unincorporated community in Columbia County, Oregon
- the former German name of the village of Grzymała,_Pomeranian_Voivodeship, in northern Poland

== People with the surname ==
- Bradley Birkenfeld, a whistleblower in the UBS bank scandal
