= Nowy Folwark, Pomeranian Voivodeship =

Nowy Folwark
- Village
- Location within Poland
- Coordinates: 53°52′1″N 19°27′20″E
- Country: Poland
- Voivodeship: Pomeranian
- County: Sztum
- Gmina: Stary Dzierzgoń
- Population: 150

Nowy Folwark [ˈnɔvɨ ˈfɔlvark] is a village in the administrative district of Gmina Stary Dzierzgoń, within Sztum County, Pomeranian Voivodeship, in northern Poland.

For the history of the region, see History of Pomerania.
