= Charlottenhof =

Charlottenhof may refer to:

- Charlottenhof Palace, palace in Sanssouci Park, Potsdam, Germany
- Aegviidu, settlement in Estonia with old German name Charlottenhof
- Giślinek, settlement in Poland with old German name Charlottenhof
