= Zakręty, Pomeranian Voivodeship =

Zakręty
- Village
- Location within Poland
- Coordinates: 53°51′26″N 19°23′22″E
- Country: Poland
- Voivodeship: Pomeranian
- County: Sztum
- Gmina: Stary Dzierzgoń
- Population: 90

Zakręty [zaˈkrɛntɨ] is a village in the administrative district of Gmina Stary Dzierzgoń, within Sztum County, Pomeranian Voivodeship, in northern Poland.

For the history of the region, see History of Pomerania.
