= Lipiec, Pomeranian Voivodeship =

Lipiec
- Village
- Location within Poland
- Coordinates: 53°55′1″N 19°25′48″E
- Country: Poland
- Voivodeship: Pomeranian
- County: Sztum
- Gmina: Stary Dzierzgoń
- Population: 160

Lipiec (Polish pronunciation: [ˈlipʲɛt͡s]) is a village in the administrative district of Gmina Stary Dzierzgoń, within Sztum County, Pomeranian Voivodeship, in northern Poland.

For the history of the region, see History of Pomerania.
