= Dziewięć Włók, Sztum County =

Dziewięć Włók
- Settlement
- Location within Poland
- Coordinates: 53°56′46″N 19°9′48″E
- Country: Poland
- Voivodeship: Pomeranian
- County: Sztum
- Gmina: Stary Targ

Dziewięć Włók ([ˈd͡ʑɛvjɛnt͡ɕ ˈvwuk]) (German: Neunhuben) is a settlement in the administrative district of Gmina Stary Targ, within Sztum County, Pomeranian Voivodeship, in northern Poland.

== See also ==
- History of Pomerania
