= Truce of Altmark =

1629 peace treaty of the Polish-Swedish war

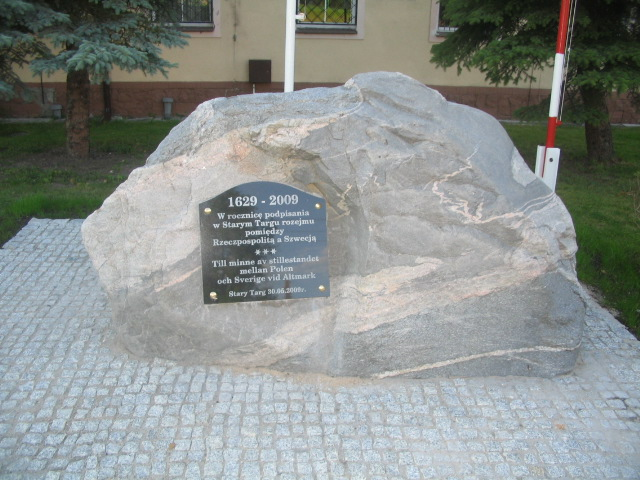
- Bilingual Polish and Swedish memorial stone in Stary Targ
- Type: Ceasefire
- Signed: 26 September [O.S. 16 September] 1629
- Location: Altmark (Stary Targ), Poland
- Parties: Polish–Lithuanian Commonwealth; Swedish Empire

The six-year Truce of Altmark (or Treaty of Stary Targ, Polish: Rozejm w Altmarku, Swedish: Stillståndet i Altmark) was signed on 26 September [O.S. 16 September] 1629 in the village of Altmark (Stary Targ), in Poland, by the Polish–Lithuanian Commonwealth and Sweden, with help from Richelieu's envoy Charnacé, ending the Polish–Swedish War (1626–1629), and freeing King Gustavus Adolphus of Sweden to enter the Thirty Years' War.

== Provisions ==
The truce allowed Sweden to retain control of Livonia. Sweden also evacuated most of the Duchy of Prussia but kept the coastal cities. Poland had other Swedish gains returned from the 1625 invasion. Most of Livonia north of the Daugava River was ceded to Sweden (Swedish Livonia), but Latgale, the southeastern area, remained under Polish rule. Sweden received the right to two third of all the shipping tolls at Polish ports, such as at Gdańsk (Danzig) and Elbląg (Elbing) and from the Duchy of Prussia, for six years. The shipping tolls financed Sweden's involvement in the Thirty Years' War.

The Truce of Altmark was signed shortly after Sweden had been defeated by Poland led by Field Crown Hetman Stanisław Koniecpolski and Holy Roman Imperial troops at Trzciana, which nearly lead to the capture of King Gustavus Adolphus of Sweden. Gustavus was wounded several times and was once saved by one of his men.

The Polish Parliament (Sejm) did not impose new taxes to pay the soldiers of the imperial army fighting under Hans Georg von Arnim-Boitzenburg and low morale made some of them mutiny or go over to Sweden. Several other countries intervened diplomatically, which eventually forced Sigismund III of Poland to enter the truce.

In 1635, the truce was extended by the Treaty of Stuhmsdorf. Sweden gave up the Prussian ports, and Poland ceded most of Livonia with Riga but kept the Latgale region.

The most important result of the truce was that it solidified Sweden's position as the ruler of the northern part of the Baltic Sea down to the Daugava, including Riga.

== See also ==
- List of treaties

== Other Sources ==
- Ulf Sundberg (2002) Svenska freder och stillestånd 1249-1814 (Hjalmarson & Högberg) ISBN 9789189080980
