= Stary Dzierzgoń =

- Village
- Location within Poland
- Coordinates: 53°50′29″N 19°24′15″E
- Country: Poland
- Voivodeship: Pomeranian
- County: Sztum
- Gmina: Stary Dzierzgoń
- Population: 410

Stary Dzierzgoń [ˈstarɨ ˈd͡ʑɛʐɡɔɲ] is a village in Sztum County, Pomeranian Voivodeship, in northern Poland. It is the seat of the gmina (administrative district) called Gmina Stary Dzierzgoń.

Before 1772 the area was part of Kingdom of Poland, in 1772-1945 it was called Alt Christburg and was on the border of East Prussia and West Prussia. For the history of the region, see History of Pomerania.

== Notable residents ==
- Franz Schleiff (born 1896), World War I German pilot
