= Gmina Stary Dzierzgoń =

Gmina Stary Dzierzgoń Stary Dzierzgoń Commune
- Gmina
- Flag Coat of arms
- Interactive map of Gmina Stary Dzierzgoń
- Coordinates (Stary Dzierzgoń): 53°50′29″N 19°24′15″E
- Country: Poland
- Voivodeship: Pomeranian
- County: Sztum
- Seat: Stary Dzierzgoń

Area
  - Total: 185.82 km^{2} (71.75 sq mi)

Population (2006)
  - Total: 4,041
  - Density: 21.75/km^{2} (56.32/sq mi)
- Website: http://www.starydzierzgon.pl

Gmina Stary Dzierzgoń is a rural gmina (administrative district) in Sztum County, Pomeranian Voivodeship, in northern Poland. Its seat is the village of Stary Dzierzgoń, which lies approximately 26 kilometres (16 mi) east of Sztum and 77 km (48 mi) south-east of the regional capital Gdańsk.

The gmina covers an area of 185.82 square kilometres (71.7 sq mi), and as of 2006 its total population is 4,041.

The gmina holds part of the protected area called Iława Lake District Landscape Park.

== Villages ==
Gmina Stary Dzierzgoń contains the villages and settlements of Adamowo, Bądze, Bartne Łąki, Białe Błoto, Bucznik, Danielówka, Folwark, Gisiel, Giślinek, Górki, Kielmy, Kołtyniany, Kornele, Królikowo, Latkowo, Lipiec, Lubochowo, Matule, Milikowo, Monasterzysko Małe, Monasterzysko Nowe, Monasterzysko Wielkie, Mortąg, Myślice, Najatki, Nowy Folwark, Piaski Morąskie, Podwiejki, Pogorzele, Popity, Porzecze, Pronie, Prońki, Protajny, Przezmark, Pudłowiec, Skolwity, Stare Miasto, Stary Dzierzgoń, Tabory, Wartule, Wesoła Kępa, Zakręty and Zamek.

== Neighbouring gminas ==
Gmina Stary Dzierzgoń is bordered by the gminas of Dzierzgoń, Małdyty, Mikołajki Pomorskie, Prabuty, Rychliki, Susz and Zalewo.
