= Bucznik, Pomeranian Voivodeship =

Bucznik
- Village
- Location within Poland
- Coordinates: 53°50′11″N 19°27′1″E
- Country: Poland
- Voivodeship: Pomeranian
- County: Sztum
- Gmina: Stary Dzierzgoń
- Population: 80

Bucznik [ˈbut͡ʂnik] is a village in the administrative district of Gmina Stary Dzierzgoń, within Sztum County, Pomeranian Voivodeship, in northern Poland.
