= Gmina Stary Targ =

Gmina Stary Targ Stary Targ Commune
- Gmina
- Flag Coat of arms
- Interactive map of Gmina Stary Targ
- Coordinates (Stary Targ): 53°55′23″N 19°9′59″E
- Country: Poland
- Voivodeship: Pomeranian
- County: Sztum
- Seat: Stary Targ

Area
  - Total: 141.04 km^{2} (54.46 sq mi)

Population (2006)
  - Total: 6,598
  - Density: 46.78/km^{2} (121.2/sq mi)
- Website: http://www.bip.starytarg.pl

Gmina Stary Targ is a rural gmina (administrative district) in Sztum County, Pomeranian Voivodeship, in northern Poland. Its seat is the village of Stary Targ, which lies approximately 9 kilometres (6 mi) east of Sztum and 61 km (38 mi) south-east of the regional capital Gdańsk.

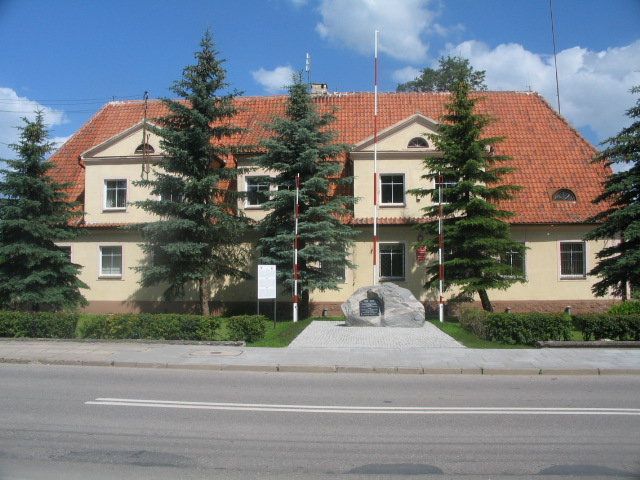
Stary Targ Commune Office Building

The gmina covers an area of 141.04 square kilometres (54.5 sq mi), and as of 2006 its total population is 6,598.

== Villages ==
Gmina Stary Targ contains the villages and settlements of Brzozówka, Bukowo, Czerwony Dwór, Dąbrówka Malborska, Dziewięć Włók, Gintro, Grzymała, Igły, Jordanki, Jurkowice, Kalwa, Kątki, Klecewo, Kościelec, Krzyżanki, Łabuń, Lasy, Łoza, Malewo, Mleczewo, Nowy Targ, Olszówka, Osiewo, Pijaki, Pozolia, Ramoty, Śledziówka Mała, Śledziówka Wielka, Stary Dwór, Stary Targ, Szropy, Szropy Niziny, Szropy-Osiedle, Telkwice, Trankwice, Tropy Sztumskie, Tulice, Tulice Małe, Waplewko, Waplewo Wielkie, Waplewo-Osiedle and Zielonki.

== Neighbouring gminas ==
Gmina Stary Targ is bordered by the gminas of Dzierzgoń, Malbork, Mikołajki Pomorskie, Stare Pole and Sztum.
