= Tabory, Poland =

Tabory
- Village
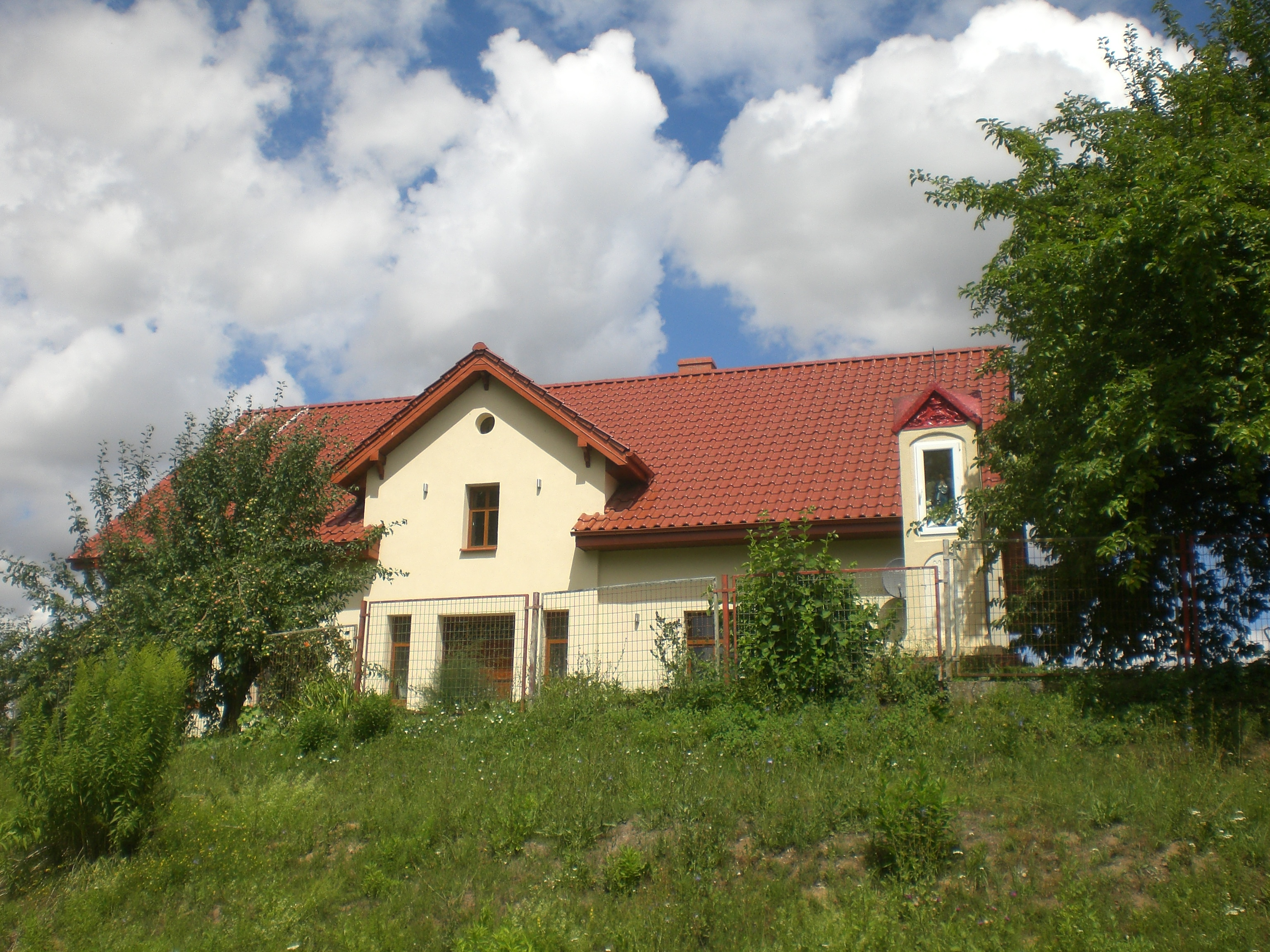

- Location within Poland
- Coordinates: 53°53′26″N 19°31′37″E
- Country: Poland
- Voivodeship: Pomeranian
- County: Sztum
- Gmina: Stary Dzierzgoń
- Population: 120

Tabory [taˈbɔrɨ] is a village in the administrative district of Gmina Stary Dzierzgoń, within Sztum County, Pomeranian Voivodeship, in northern Poland.

For the history of the region, see History of Pomerania.
