= Giślinek =

- Settlement
- Location within Poland
- Coordinates: 53°56′25″N 19°31′7″E
- Country: Poland
- Voivodeship: Pomeranian
- County: Sztum
- Gmina: Stary Dzierzgoń
- Population: 9

Giślinek [ɡiˈɕlinɛk] is a settlement in the administrative district of Gmina Stary Dzierzgoń, within Sztum County, Pomeranian Voivodeship, in northern Poland.

For the history of the region, see History of Pomerania.
