= Zamek, Pomeranian Voivodeship =

Zamek
- Settlement
- Location within Poland
- Coordinates: 53°51′19″N 19°24′22″E
- Country: Poland
- Voivodeship: Pomeranian
- County: Sztum
- Gmina: Stary Dzierzgoń

Zamek [ˈzamɛk] is a settlement in the administrative district of Gmina Stary Dzierzgoń, within Sztum County, Pomeranian Voivodeship, in northern Poland.

For the history of the region, see History of Pomerania.
