= Latkowo, Pomeranian Voivodeship =

Latkowo
- Village
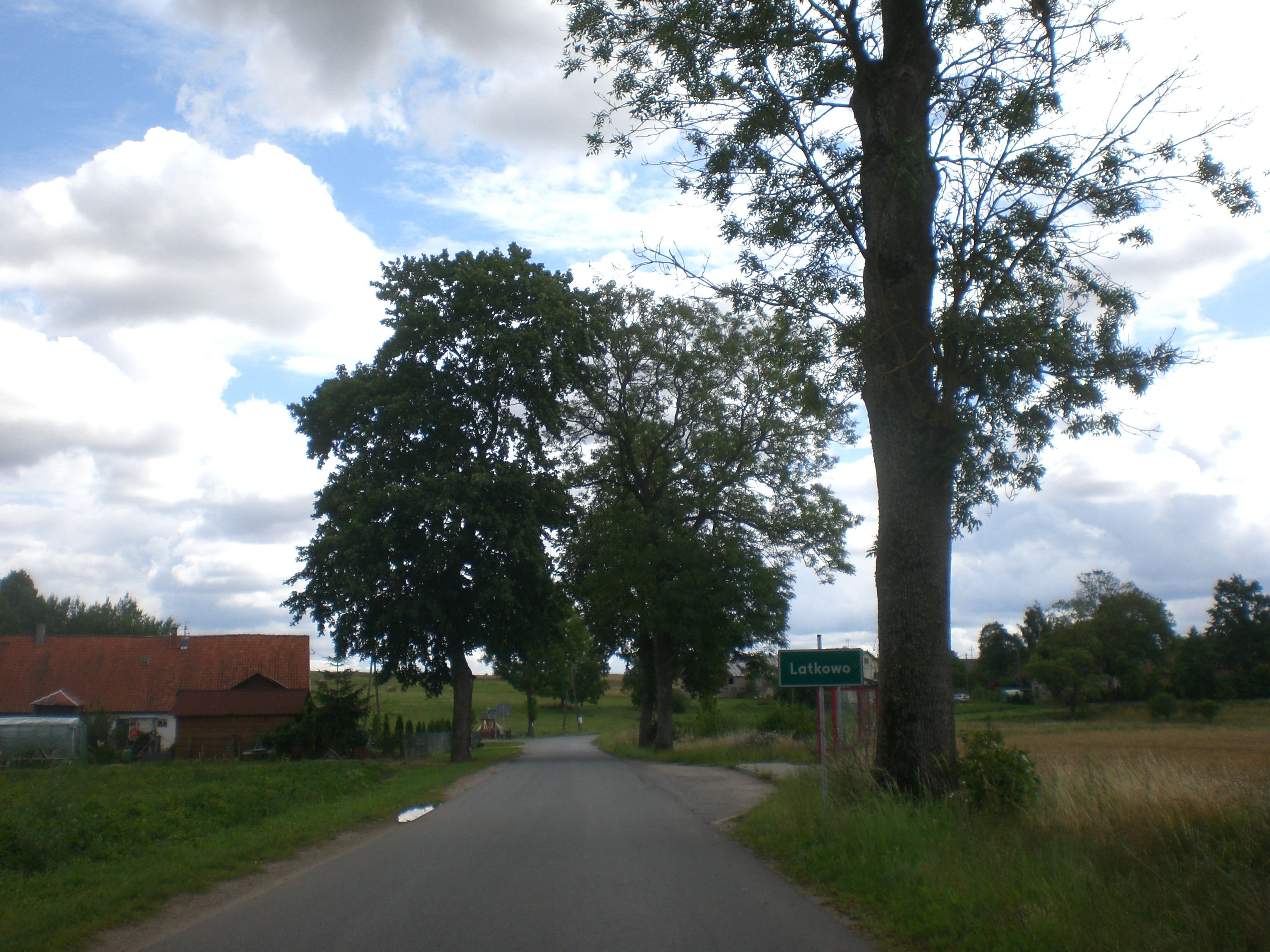

- Location within Poland
- Coordinates: 53°54′19″N 19°32′9″E
- Country: Poland
- Voivodeship: Pomeranian
- County: Sztum
- Gmina: Stary Dzierzgoń
- Population: 110

Latkowo [latˈkɔvɔ] is a village in the administrative district of Gmina Stary Dzierzgoń, within Sztum County, Pomeranian Voivodeship, in northern Poland.

For the history of the region, see History of Pomerania.
