= Stary Targ =

- Village
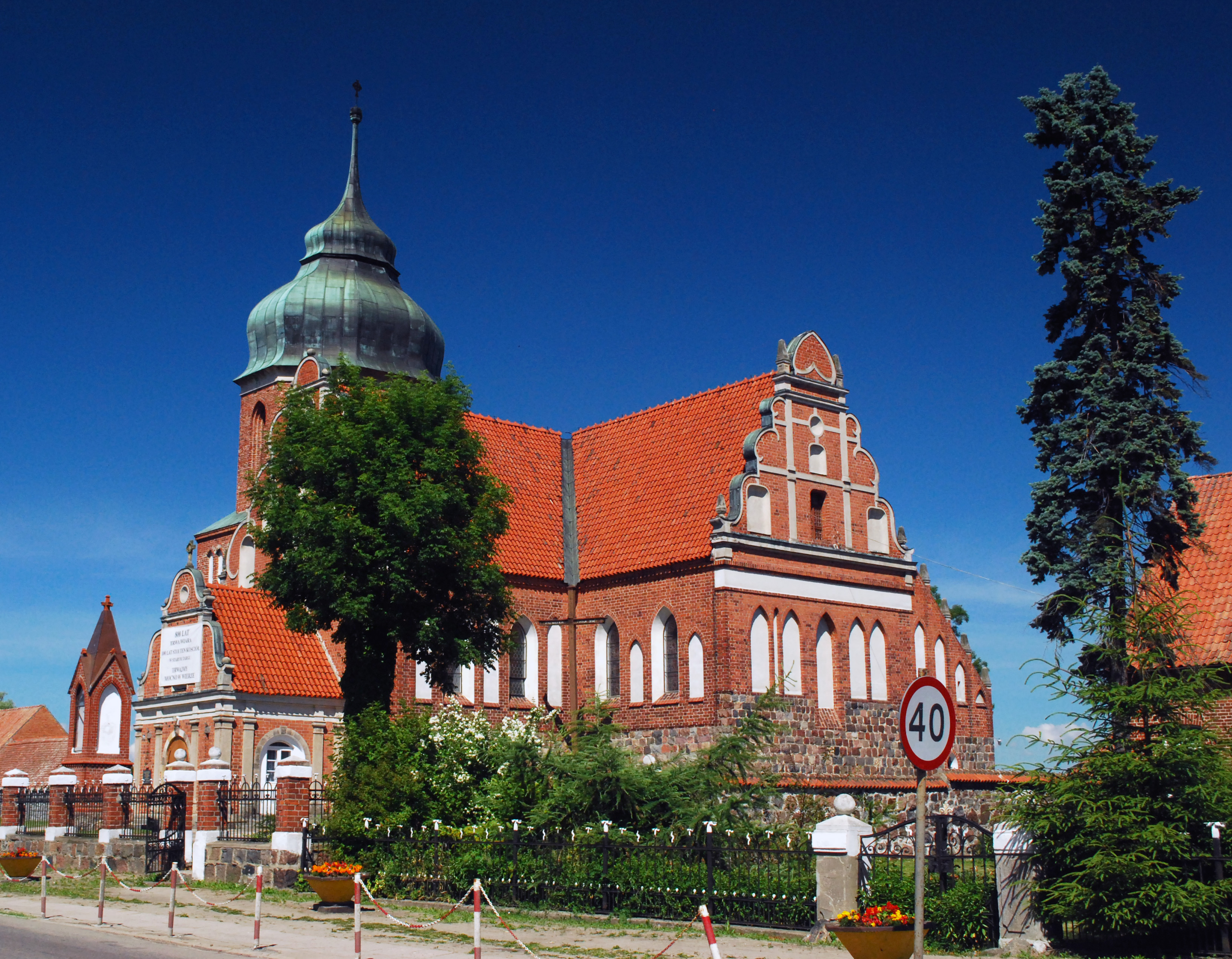
- Church of Saints Simon and Jude

- Location within Poland
- Coordinates: 53°55′23″N 19°9′59″E
- Country: Poland
- Voivodeship: Pomeranian
- County: Sztum
- Gmina: Stary Targ

Population
  - Total: 1,000
- Time zone: UTC+1 (CET)
  - Summer (DST): UTC+2 (CEST)
- Vehicle registration: GSZ

Stary Targ ([ˈstarɨ ˈtark]) (German: Altmark in Westpreußen) (literally "Old Market") is a village in Sztum County, Pomeranian Voivodeship, in northern Poland. It is the seat of the gmina (administrative district) called Gmina Stary Targ.

== History ==
The village was founded by commander Hermann von Schönberg sometime between 1271 and 1276 and granted town privileges based on the city law of Chełmno. The town church, dedicated to saints Simon and Jude, was probably constructed sometime after 1320. Polish King Władysław II Jagiełło stayed in the village following his victory at the Battle of Grunwald in 1410. Jan Długosz mentioned the village in his 15th-century chronicles under the Old Polish name Starytarg. In 1629, a truce between the Polish–Lithuanian Commonwealth and Sweden was signed in the village. At the outbreak of the Swedish invasion of Poland, known as the Deluge, the village had a population of 25 farmers, two tavern-keepers, one miller and a wójt. In 1664, following the war, the population had diminished to three farmers, one miller, one inn-keeper and the wójt.

The village was annexed by Prussia in the First Partition of Poland in 1772. In 1820 the village had 422 inhabitants, in 1885 the number was 1,052 (including 934 Catholic Poles), in 1905 it was 1,047 and in 1939 it was 1,283. The population was employed mostly in farming. In 1887, a Polish bank was founded. Following the restoration of independent Poland after World War I, a plebiscite was held to decide whether the area would remain in Germany or be reintegrated with Poland. The local Polish population was well organized, several Polish rallies were held in the village before the voting, and local Poles even repelled a German armed attack on a meeting of the Polish Women's Society. The majority voted for Poland.

== Sports ==
The local football club is Powiśle Stary Targ. It formerly competed in the lower leagues, and today it's a youth team.
