= Tabory, Ukraine =

Tabory Табори
- Village
- Interactive map of Tabory
- Coordinates: 50°16′42″N 27°35′51″E

Area
  - Total: 1.477 km^{2} (0.570 sq mi)

Population
  - Total: 438
- Postal code: 12760

Tabory (Ukrainian: Табори Tabory) is a village in Ukraine located in the Zviahel Raion of the Zhytomyr Oblast. The territorial administrative code (KOATUU) is 1820682602. It has a population of 438 people as of 2001. Its postal index is 12701 and its calling code is 4144.

The address of the village council is 12737, Ukraine, village Yosipovka and their telephone number is 79-5-42.
