= Tabory (settlement), Dobryanka, Perm Krai =

Tabory Таборы
- Settlement
- Location within Perm Krai Location within Russia
- Coordinates: 58°41′N 56°58′E
- Country: Russia
- Region: Perm Krai
- District: Dobryansky District
- Time zone: UTC+5:00

Tabory (Russian: Таборы) is a rural locality (a settlement) in Dobryansky District, Perm Krai, Russia. The population was 129 as of 2010. There are 11 streets.

== Geography ==
Tabory is located 57 km northeast of Dobryanka (the district's administrative centre) by road. Tabory (selo) is the nearest rural locality.
