= Sztum County =

Sztum County Powiat sztumski
- County
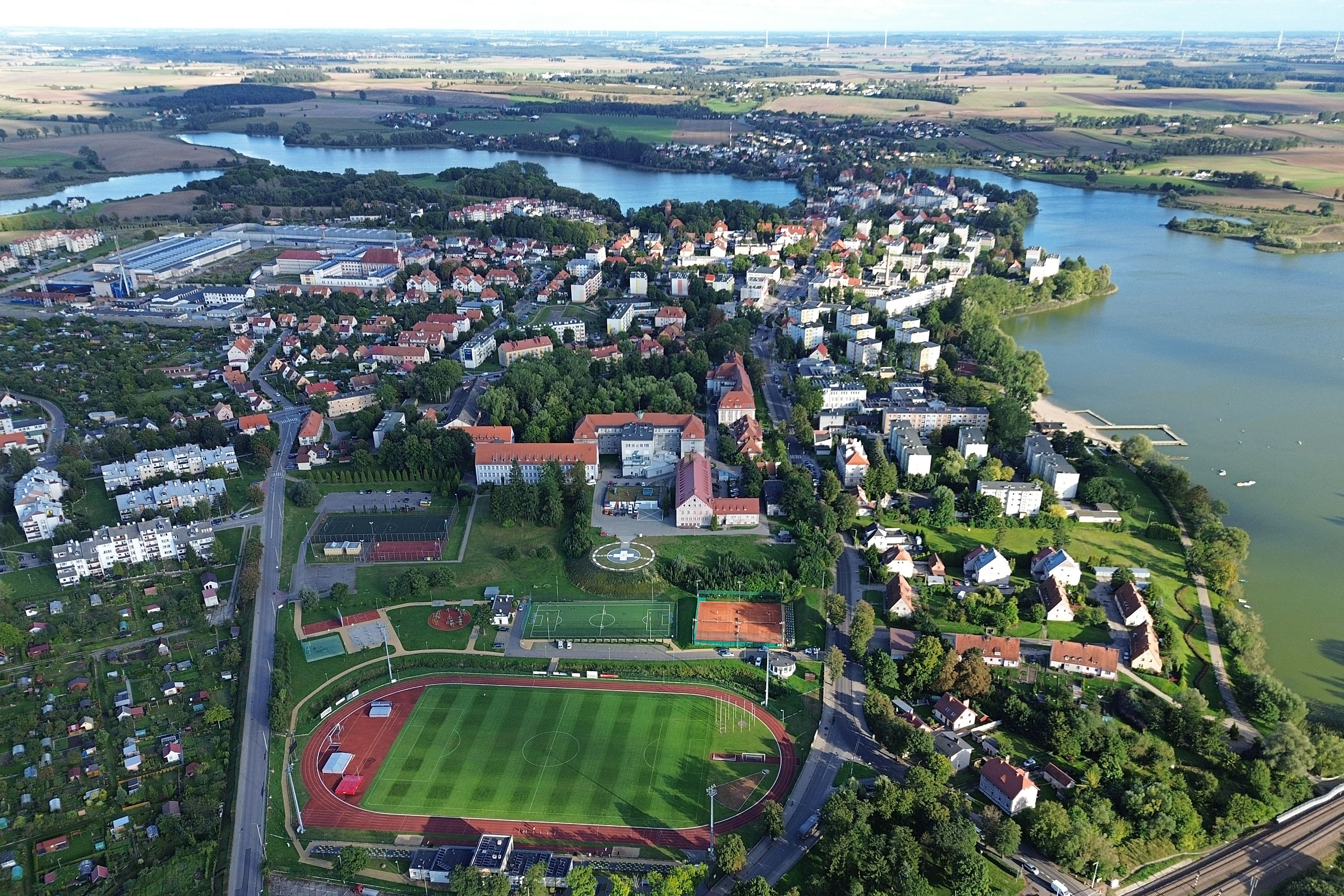
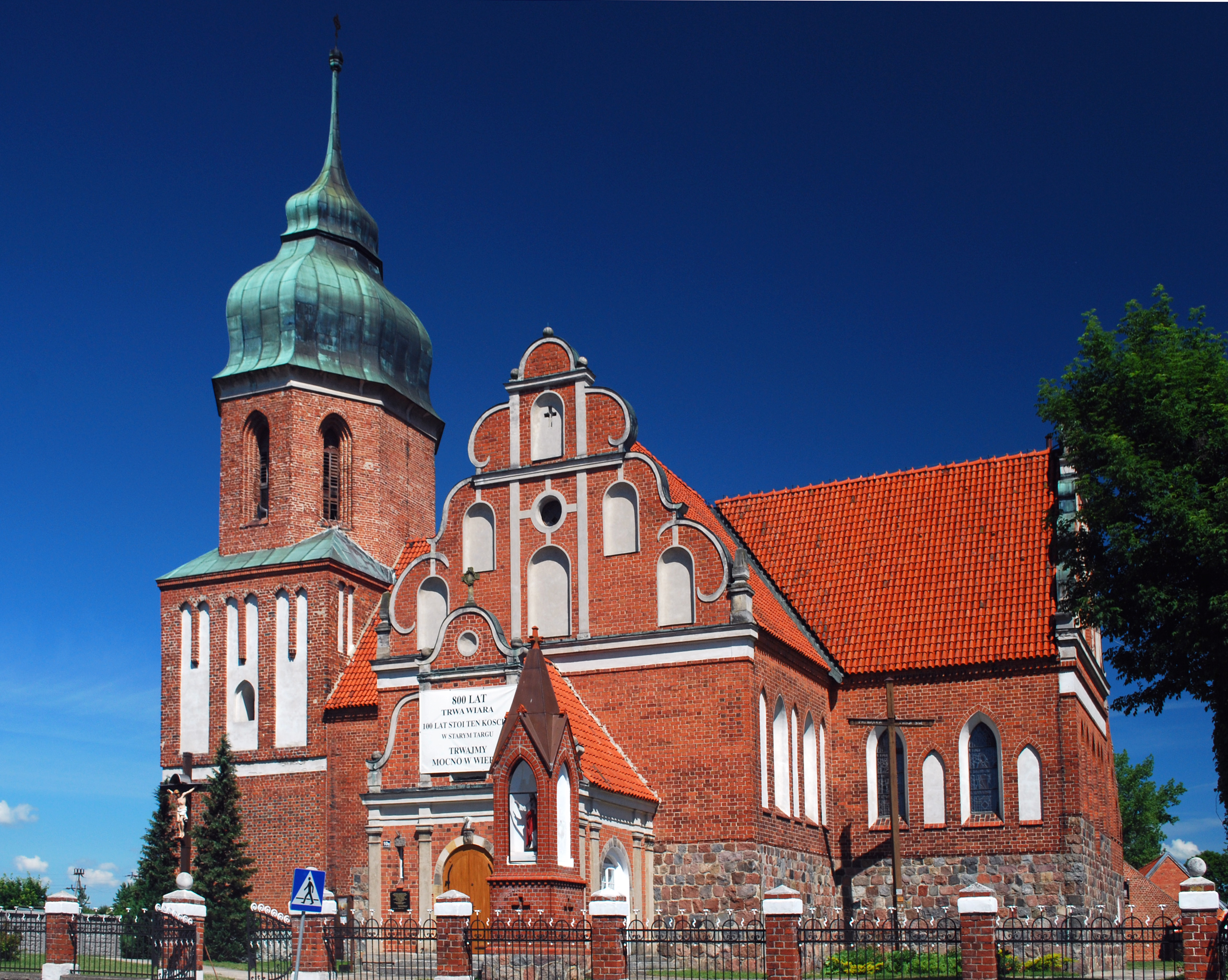
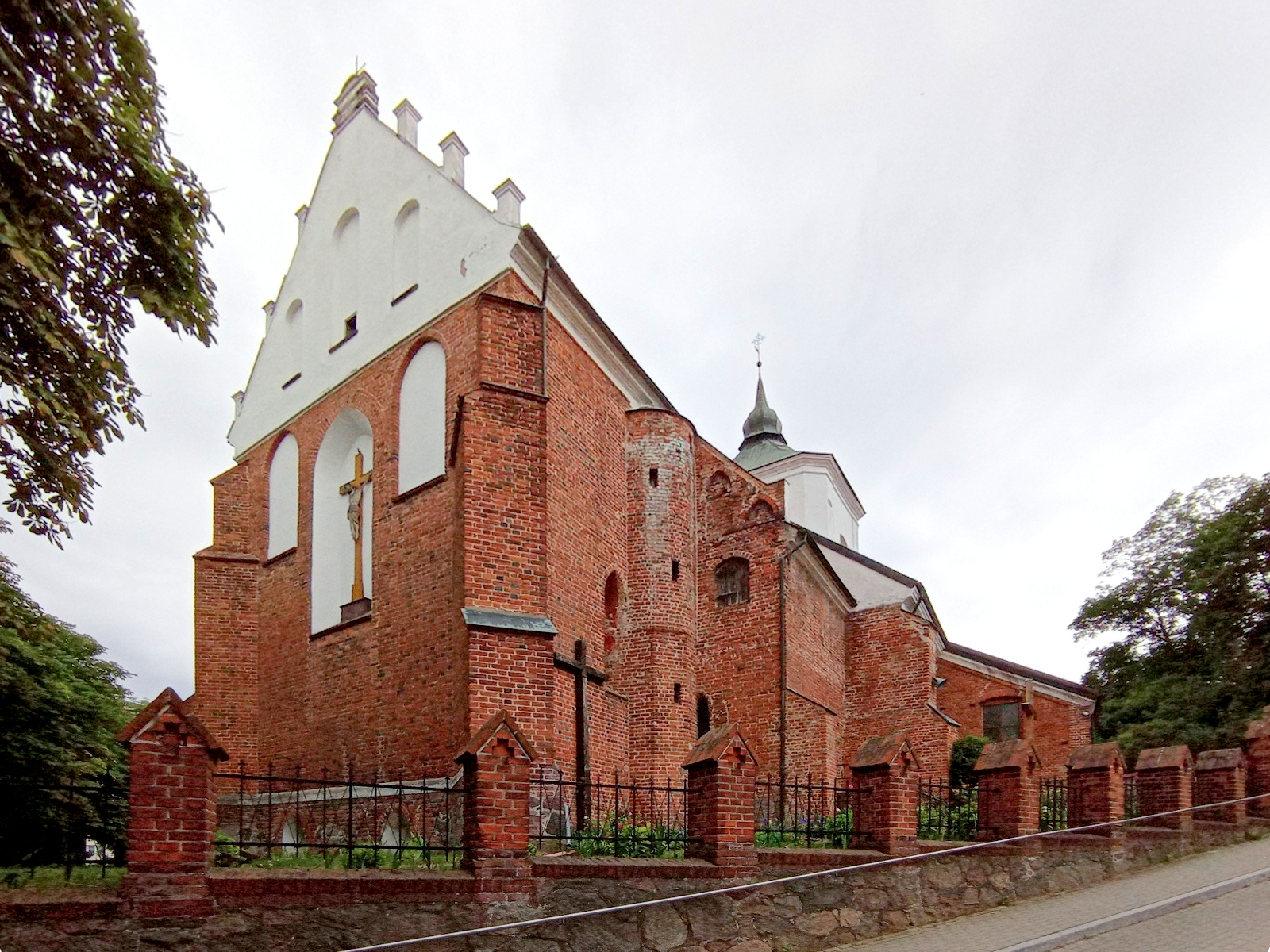
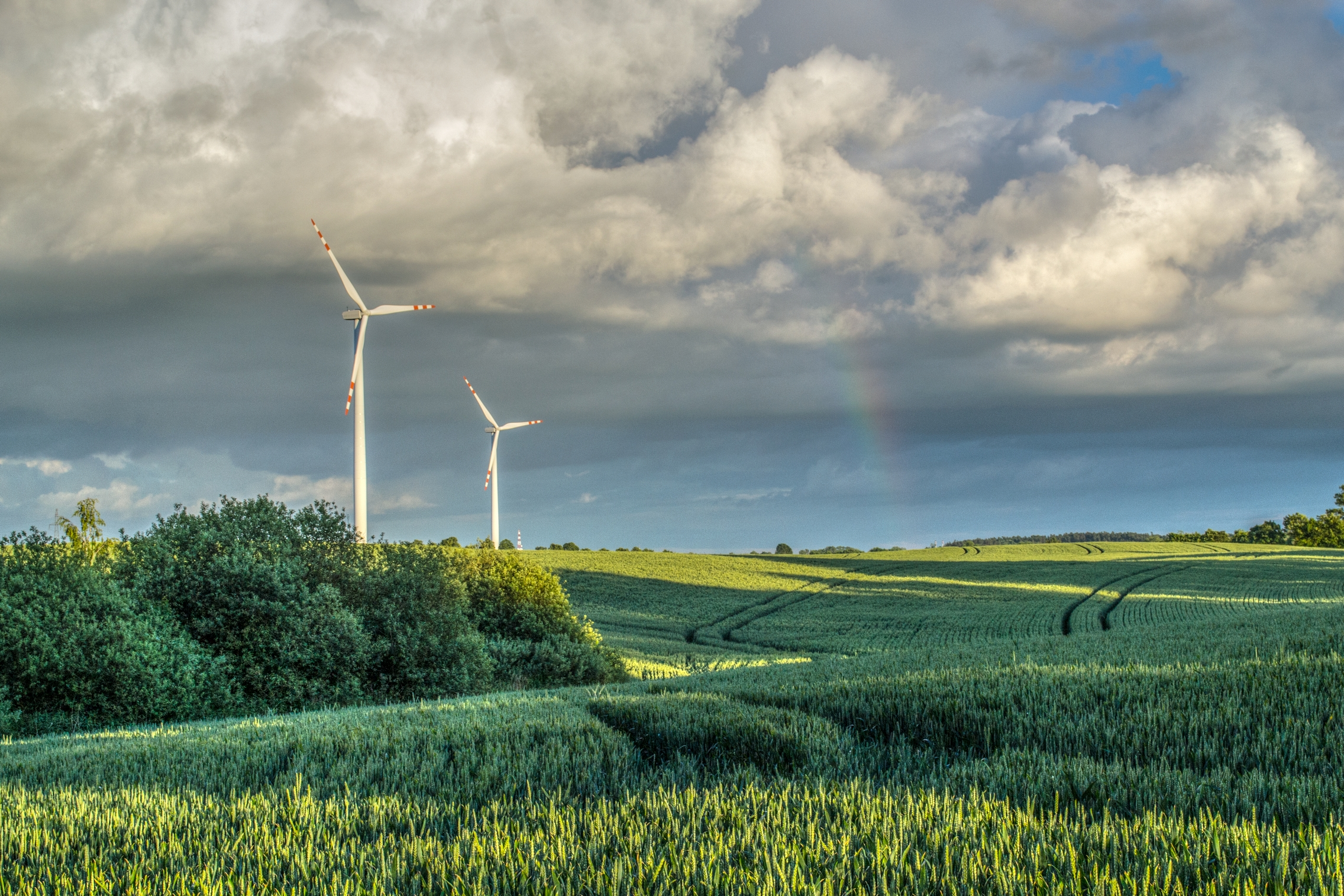
- Aerial view of Sztum Simon and Jude church in Stary Targ Holy Trinity church in Dzierzgoń Farmland in Gościszewo Sierakowski Palace in Waplewo Wielkie

- Flag Coat of arms

- Division into gminas
- Coordinates (Sztum): 53°55′18″N 19°2′1″E
- Country: Poland
- Voivodeship: Pomeranian
- Seat: Sztum
- Gminas: Total 5: Gmina Dzierzgoń; Gmina Mikołajki Pomorskie; Gmina Stary Dzierzgoń; Gmina Stary Targ; Gmina Sztum

Area
  - Total: 730.85 km^{2} (282.18 sq mi)

Population (2019)
  - Total: 41,476
  - Density: 56.750/km^{2} (146.98/sq mi)
  - Urban: 15,304
  - Rural: 26,172
- Time zone: UTC+1 (CET)
  - Summer (DST): UTC+2 (CEST)
- Car plates: GSZ
- Website: www.powiatsztumski.pl

Sztum County (Polish: powiat sztumski) is a unit of territorial administration and local government (powiat) in Pomeranian Voivodeship, northern Poland. Its administrative seat and largest town is Sztum, which lies 56 kilometres (35 mi) south-east of the regional capital Gdańsk. The only other town in the county is Dzierzgoń, lying 21 km (13 mi) east of Sztum.

The county was created, as a result of local pressure, in 2002. The area had been part of Malbork County.

The county covers an area of 730.85 square kilometres (282.2 sq mi). As of 2019 its total population is 41,476, out of which the population of Sztum is 9,940, that of Dzierzgoń is 5,364, and the rural population is 26,172.

Sztum County on a map of the counties of Pomeranian Voivodeship

Sztum County is bordered by Malbork County to the north, Elbląg County to the north-east, Ostróda County to the east, Iława County to the south-east, Kwidzyn County to the south and Tczew County to the west.

== Administrative divisions ==
The county is subdivided into five gminas (two urban-rural and three rural). These are listed in the following table, in descending order of population.

Gmina	'Type	Area (km^{2})	Population (2019)	Seat
Gmina Sztum	urban-rural	180.8	18,387	Sztum
Gmina Dzierzgoń	urban-rural	131.4	9,251	Dzierzgoń
Gmina Stary Targ	rural	141.0	6,253	Stary Targ
Gmina Stary Dzierzgoń	rural	185.8	3,950	Stary Dzierzgoń
Gmina Mikołajki Pomorskie	rural	91.8	3,635	Mikołajki Pomorskie
