= Horki (disambiguation) =

Horki is a town in the Mogilev Region of Belarus.

Horki may also refer to:

- Horki District, in Mogilev Region
- Horki, Brest Region, a village in Belarus
- Horki, Gomel Region, a village in Belarus
- Horki (brand), an automobile brand

== See also ==
- Gorky (disambiguation)
- Górki (disambiguation), locations in Poland
- Gorki (disambiguation), locations in Russia
