= Malye Gorki =

Malye Gorki (Russian: Малые Горки) is the name of several rural localities in Russia:

- Malye Gorki, Leningrad Oblast, a village in Ropshinskoye Settlement Municipal Formation of Lomonosovsky District of Leningrad Oblast
- Malye Gorki, Republic of Mordovia, a village in Silinsky Selsoviet of Ardatovsky District of the Republic of Mordovia
- Malye Gorki, Naro-Fominsky District, Moscow Oblast, a village under the administrative jurisdiction of the Town of Aprelevka in Naro-Fominsky District of Moscow Oblast
- Malye Gorki, Ruzsky District, Moscow Oblast, a village in Volkovskoye Rural Settlement of Ruzsky District of Moscow Oblast
- Malye Gorki, Nizhny Novgorod Oblast, a village in Yagubovsky Selsoviet of Buturlinsky District of Nizhny Novgorod Oblast
- Malye Gorki, Tver Oblast, a village in Verkhnevolzhskoye Rural Settlement of Kalininsky District of Tver Oblast
- Malye Gorki, Vladimir Oblast, a village in Petushinsky District of Vladimir Oblast
- Malye Gorki, Voronezh Oblast, a settlement in Orlovskoye Rural Settlement of Novousmansky District of Voronezh Oblast

== See also ==
- Gorki (disambiguation)
