= Górki =

Górki (meaning "hills") may refer to the following places in Poland:

== Greater Poland Voivodeship ==
- Górki, Kalisz County in Greater Poland Voivodeship (central Poland)
- Górki, Koło County in Greater Poland Voivodeship (central Poland)

== Łódź Voivodeship ==
- Górki, Pajęczno County in Łódź Voivodeship (central Poland)
- Górki, Sieradz County in Łódź Voivodeship (central Poland)

== Lublin Voivodeship ==
- Górki, Gmina Karczmiska in Lublin Voivodeship (east Poland)
- Górki, Parczew County in Lublin Voivodeship (east Poland)

== Lubusz Voivodeship ==
- Górki, Gorzów County in Lubusz Voivodeship (west Poland)
- Górki, Strzelce-Drezdenko County in Lubusz Voivodeship (west Poland)

== Masovian Voivodeship ==
- Górki, Białobrzegi County in Masovian Voivodeship (east-central Poland)
- Górki, Garwolin County in Masovian Voivodeship (east-central Poland)
- Górki, Łosice County in Masovian Voivodeship (east Poland)
- Górki, Mińsk County in Masovian Voivodeship (east-central Poland)
- Górki, Gmina Leoncin, Nowy Dwór County in Masovian Voivodeship (east-central Poland)
- Górki, Otwock County in Masovian Voivodeship (east-central Poland)
- Górki, Płock County in Masovian Voivodeship (central Poland)
- Górki, Przasnysz County in Masovian Voivodeship (north-central Poland)
- Górki, Siedlce County in Masovian Voivodeship (east Poland)
- Górki, Sochaczew County in Masovian Voivodeship (east-central Poland)
- Górki, Żyrardów County in Masovian Voivodeship (east-central Poland)
- Górki, a former village in modern Warsaw, Poland, within the contemporary neighbourhood of Załuski

== Pomeranian Voivodeship ==
- Górki, Bytów County in Pomeranian Voivodeship (north Poland)
- Górki, Gmina Stary Dzierzgoń in Pomeranian Voivodeship (north Poland)
- Górki, Gmina Sztum in Pomeranian Voivodeship (north Poland)
- Górki, Kościerzyna County in Pomeranian Voivodeship (north Poland)
- Górki, Kwidzyn County in Pomeranian Voivodeship (north Poland)

== Silesian Voivodeship ==
- Górki, a district of the town of Lędziny, in Silesian Voivodeship
- Górki, Kłobuck County in Silesian Voivodeship (south Poland)

== Subcarpathian Voivodeship ==
- Górki, Brzozów County in Subcarpathian Voivodeship (south-east Poland)
- Górki, Mielec County in Subcarpathian Voivodeship (south-east Poland)

== Świętokrzyskie Voivodeship ==
- Górki, Busko County in Świętokrzyskie Voivodeship (south-central Poland)
- Górki, Kielce County in Świętokrzyskie Voivodeship (south-central Poland)
- Górki, Pińczów County in Świętokrzyskie Voivodeship (south-central Poland)
- Górki, Sandomierz County in Świętokrzyskie Voivodeship (south-central Poland)
- Górki, Skarżysko County in Świętokrzyskie Voivodeship (south-central Poland)

== Warmian-Masurian Voivodeship ==
- Górki, Kętrzyn County in Warmian-Masurian Voivodeship (north Poland)
- Górki, Pisz County in Warmian-Masurian Voivodeship (north Poland)

== West Pomeranian Voivodeship ==
- Górki, Choszczno County in West Pomeranian Voivodeship (north-west Poland)
- Górki, Kamień County in West Pomeranian Voivodeship (north-west Poland)
- Górki, Szczecinek County in West Pomeranian Voivodeship (north-west Poland)

== Other voivodeships ==
- Górki, Kuyavian-Pomeranian Voivodeship (central Poland)
- Górki, Opole Voivodeship (south Poland)

== See also ==
- Gorki (disambiguation)
- Gorky (disambiguation)
- Górki Małe (disambiguation) (set index article)
- Górki Wielkie
