= Ben Silbert =

American painter and watercolorist

- Born: 1893; Horki, Russian Empire
- Died: 1940 (aged 46–47)
- Education: Studied with Ángel Zárraga
- Known for: Painting, watercolor

Ben Silbert (1893 – 1940) was an American painter and watercolorist of Russian origin, active in Paris between the two World Wars and known for his depictions of European and Southeast Asian scenes.

== Early life and education ==
Ben Silbert was born in 1893 in Horki, Russian Empire (present-day Belarus). He emigrated to the United States with his parents as a child, became an American citizen, and spent his formative years in Chicago. After World War I, he relocated to Paris, where he studied under the Mexican painter Ángel Zárraga.

== Career ==
In 1922, Silbert exhibited at Alfred Flechtheim’s gallery, earning early critical notice among avant‑garde circles. He became known in the Paris art scene as “Ben Silbert de Chicago,” and in September 1927 was interviewed by the Detroit Jewish Chronicle during a U.S. trip. In 1928 the prominent critic Louis Vauxcelles published a monograph on Silbert’s work—prefaced by Ludwig Lewisohn—edited by the Charles Auguste Girard gallery in Paris. During the 1930s, Silbert traveled extensively in Southeast Asia and Oceania. He executed numerous views and portraits in Bali, Laos, Cambodia and the Samoa Islands. In January 1940, shortly before his death, he donated several Finnish landscape watercolors to be auctioned for a Finnish relief fund.

== Personal life and death ==
Silbert died in 1940 at the age of 47. Little is recorded of his personal life beyond his artistic travels.

== Selected works in public collections ==
- Castilian Woman, 1927, watercolor on paperboard — Brooklyn Museum, New York
- (Various works) — Weatherspoon Art Museum, University of North Carolina at Greensboro
- Portrait of Dr. Claribel Cone, 1926 - Weatherspoon Art Museum, the University of North Carolina at Greensboro
- Works by Silbert — Art Institute of Chicago
- Portrait of Etta Cone — Baltimore Museum of Art
