= Naprasnawka =

Village in Mogilev Region, Belarus

Naprasnawka Напраснаўка (Belarusian) Напрасновка (Russian)
- Village
- Location within Belarus
- Coordinates: 54°18′58″N 30°35′52″E
- Country: Belarus
- Region: Mogilev Region
- District: Horki District
- Time zone: UTC+3 (MSK)

Naprasnawka (Belarusian: Напраснаўка, romanized: Naprasnaŭka; Russian: Напрасновка, romanized: Naprasnovka) is a village in Horki District, Mogilev Region, Belarus. It is administratively part of Maslaki selsoviet. It is located 45 kilometres (28 mi) north-northeast of Mogilev.

== History ==
In 1930, there were 248 Jews living in Naprasnawka.

=== World War II ===
During World War II, it was under German military occupation from July 1941 until the summer of 1944.

A form of ghetto or concentration camp was likely created in the village. On 22 March 1942, an Aktion took place, in which the Germans and local police killed 250 Jews, according to interrogations conducted by the Soviet Extraordinary State Commission.

== Sources ==
- Megargee, Geoffrey P.; Dean, Martin (2012). The United States Holocaust Memorial Museum Encyclopedia of Camps and Ghettos 1933–1945. Volume II. Indiana University Press, United States Holocaust Memorial Museum. p. 1708. ISBN 978-0-253-35599-7.
