= GAZ-51 =

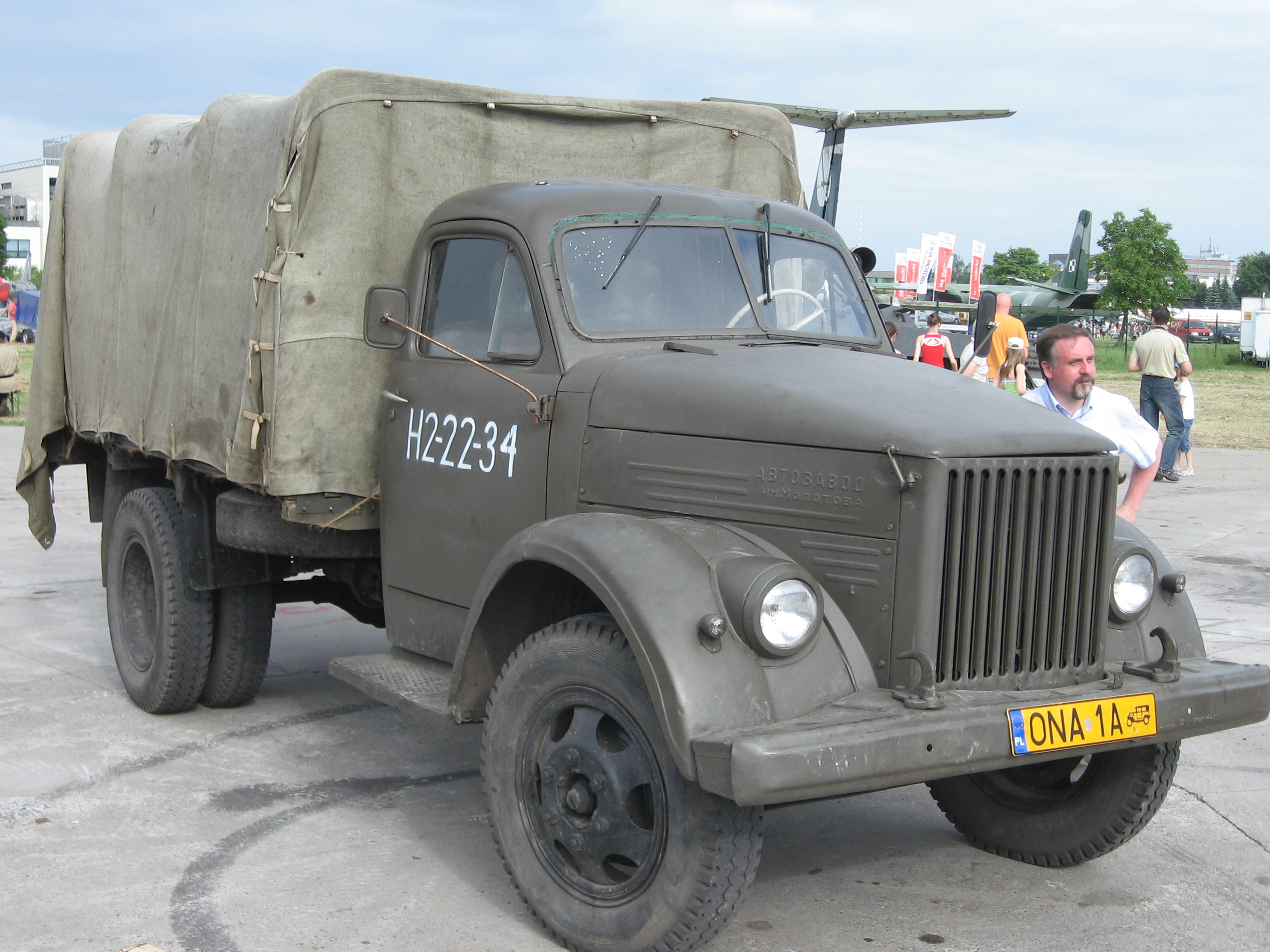

Overview
- Manufacturer: GAZ
- Also called: FSC Lublin-51 (Poland); Sungri-58 (North Korea); Yuejin NJ-130 (China)
- Production: 1946–1975; 1958–1979 (Sungri 58); 1961–1979 (Sungri 61)

Body and chassis
- Layout: FR layout

Powertrain
- Engine: 3.5L GAZ-51 I6
- Transmission: 4-speed manual

Dimensions
- Wheelbase: 3,300 mm (129.9 in)
- Length: 5,715 mm (225.0 in)
- Width: 2,280 mm (89.8 in)
- Height: 2,130 mm (83.9 in)
- Curb weight: 2,710–3,490 kg (5,975–7,694 lb)

Chronology
- Predecessor: GAZ-MM
- Successor: GAZ-53; GAZ-66

The GAZ-51 (Russian: ГАЗ-51) is a light truck manufactured by the Soviet vehicle manufacturer Gorkovsky Avtomobilny Zavod. The vehicle was designed before the Second World War and mass-produced together with the all-wheel-drive version GAZ-63 after the end of the war. Under the designation GAZ-93, a tipper was produced on the basis of the GAZ-51.

The GAZ-51 was a 4x2 2.5 ton truck while the GAZ-63 had all-wheel drive.

== History ==
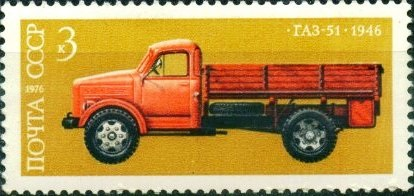
USSR postage stamp No. 4579. 1976

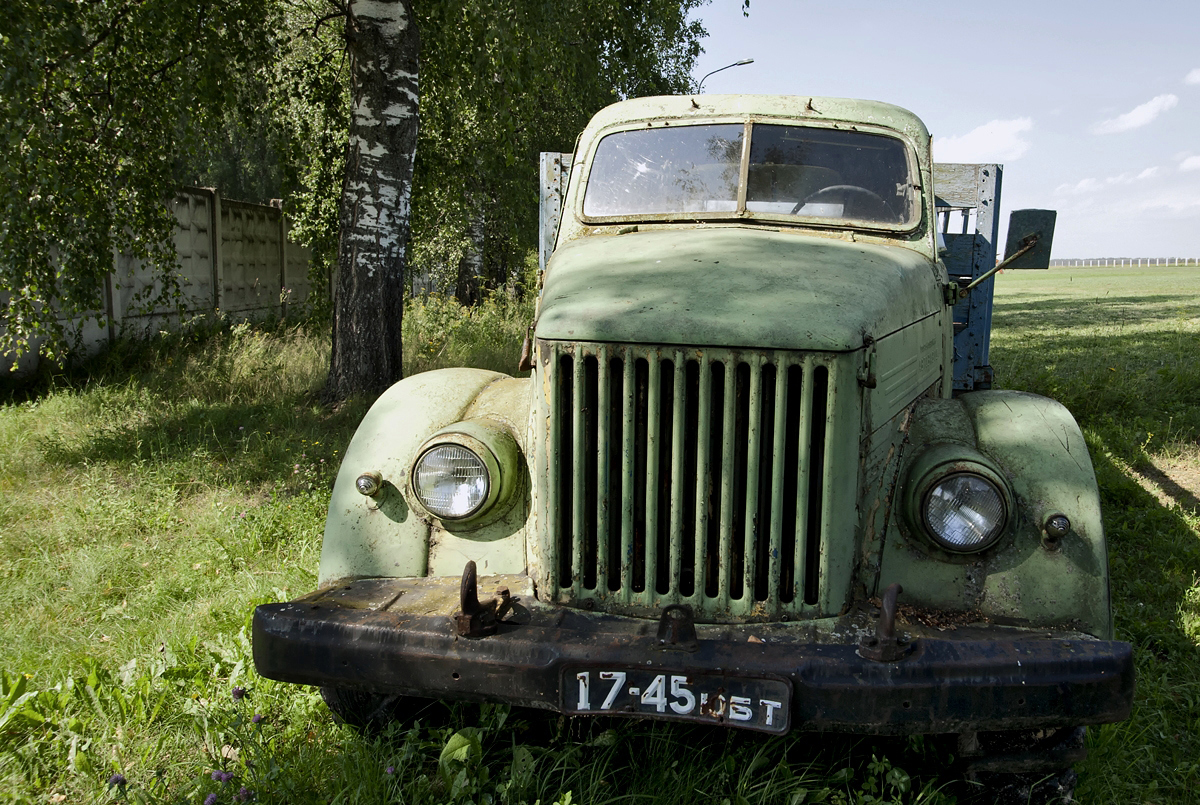
Front view of a GAZ-51A (2012)

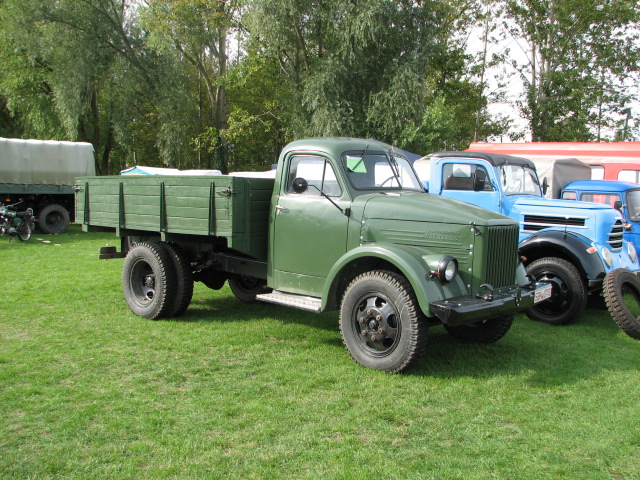
GAZ-51

The ideas for the development of the GAZ-51 date back to the mid-1930s. The GAZ-AA proved to be increasingly outdated, even by Soviet standards. The American model, the Ford AA, had already been taken out of production in 1931. Accordingly, the GAZ-11-51 was designed from February 1937, a light truck with a more powerful engine and a completely revised cab. The latter was a contemporary styled late 1930s truck cab and similar to the GAZ-M1 car.

The installed six-cylinder gasoline engine was a copy of the Chrysler flathead engine as used in the Dodge D5 passenger car. As early as 1936, the Soviet Union had bought a large quantity of these engines in order to replicate them. Production began at GAZ in 1937 under the name GAZ-11. Before the war, it was initially only installed in passenger cars, for example in the GAZ-11-73 and the GAZ-61. During the war, it was installed in light tanks such as the T-60, T-70, T-80 and the self-propelled gun SU-76 as GAZ-202 (which was derived from the GAZ-11 engine). It was not until after the war that it was also used in production trucks – as originally planned.

By 1939, two prototypes of the GAZ-11-51 had been completed. Due to the war, work on the project was interrupted and not resumed until 1943. Further prototypes were built, incorporating many components from the Studebaker US6, such as the cab, which proved very reliable and durable when in service with the Soviet army. In June 1945, pre-series production began. On July 19, 1945, a presentation took place in the Moscow Kremlin, after which large-scale production was approved. This began on January 6, 1946. Models from this early stage can be recognized by the fact that the side windows do not yet have the rounded upper edge that would later be typical.

From 1955, the modernized version GAZ-51A was produced. In the summer of 1957, Molotov's name was deleted from the factory name, which was reflected in the fact that "Gorkovsky Avtozavod" (Горьковский автозавод) was now engraved on the fenders instead of "Avtozavod imeni Molotova" (Автозавод имени Молотова). In 1958, annual production reached its peak of 173,000 units. In 1961, production of the successor GAZ-53 started and a few years later there was the GAZ-52. Nevertheless, the GAZ-51 continued to be built until April 2, 1975 and some special versions such as the GAZ-93 tipper until 1976. In total, 3,481,033 GAZ-51 trucks rolled off the assembly line in almost 30 years.

== Variants ==
Based on the GAZ-51, countless modifications and special vehicles were created over the course of almost 30 years of production. The following list is therefore not complete and is only intended to provide an overview.

- GAZ-11-51 – prototype from 1939 with a completely different cab
- GAZ-51 – basic truck version, mass-produced from 1946 to 1955
- GAZ-51A – basic version, built from 1955 to 1975
- GAZ-51F – prototype with optimized engine from 1961, no series production
- GAZ-51K – Ambulance on the chassis of the GAZ-51
- GAZ-51L – model with reinforced frame and a payload of three tons, built from 1953 to 1975
- GAZ-51M – chassis for PMG-12 fire trucks. Built from 1949 to 1953.
- GAZ-51P – tractor unit, manufactured from 1956 to 1975 on the basis of the GAZ-51A
- GAZ-51R – freight taxi, which was also suitable for passenger transport. Production took place from 1956 to 1975.
- GAZ-51Sch – model with conversion to operation on natural gas, mass-produced from 1950 onwards.
- GAZ-51 half-track – prototype, two were built in 1953 and 1954
- GAZ-93 – mass-produced tipper based on the GAZ-51, several versions were produced from 1948 to 1976. Over 300,000 units were built.
- GZA-651 – minibus on the chassis of the GAZ-51. Over time, there have been various variations from different manufacturers. The PAZ-652 and RAF-251 also use the chassis of the truck.
- K-2.5-1E – Mobile crane, built from 1950 to 1963.
- KI-51 – refrigerated transporter built from 1955 to 1958 based on the GAZ-51
- AZU-20 (51) 60А – Fire engine, built from 1959 to 1975. About 10 to 15 other fire engines such as turntable ladders or tank fire trucks were manufactured on the basis of the GAZ-51.
- AKS 51-22 "Aremkuz" – minibus produced in Moscow from 1950 to 1962, very similar to the GZA-651.
- Progress-8 – This minibus was produced especially for the Soviet Army in a repair plant based on GAZ-51 chassis.
- AZPT-1,8 – 1800 litre milk tanker
- MPR-812D – Tool Trolley
- S-4M – snow loader. Only the chassis and part of the technology were used, and the body was completely redesigned. Vehicles of this type were in use at least from 1975, there were various other versions. The purpose of the machine is to automatically pick up snow and load it onto trucks via a conveyor belt.

In addition to the listed versions, the GAZ-51 was built under license in some states. In Poland, the FSC Lublin-51 was built in the Fabryka Samochodów Ciężarowych. It was produced on a trial basis from 1948 and in series production from 1952, and by July 1959 17,497 to 17,840 units had been built, depending on the source. The successor there was the FSC Żuk delivery light van. In China, both the GAZ-51A and the GAZ-63 were built under license from 1958 onwards, manufactured by the later Nanjing Automobile Group. The model was given the name Yuejing NJ-130/230.

In North Korea, too, a licensed version was created with the Sungri-58 (Victory-58), which was produced in the Sungri Motor Plant from 1958 onwards. With some modifications, this happened until the 1990s, and the GAZ-63 was also rebuilt there. In 1979, the truck received a new cab and continued mostly unchanged mechanically until the 1990s. Modernized versions of this truck were still being built until the 2010s, but it is unknown if they are still produced today.

The GAZ-51 engine also turned out to be quite resilient and durable. Being in production since 1946, in addition to the GAZ-51, was used for many years (boosted to 90 hp by installing two carburetors and equipped with a fluid coupling) on GAZ-12 passenger cars, and also in the BTR-40, BTR-60, and BRDM-1 armoured personnel carriers, and it was used in the GAZ-52 truck until 1989.

== GAZ-63 ==
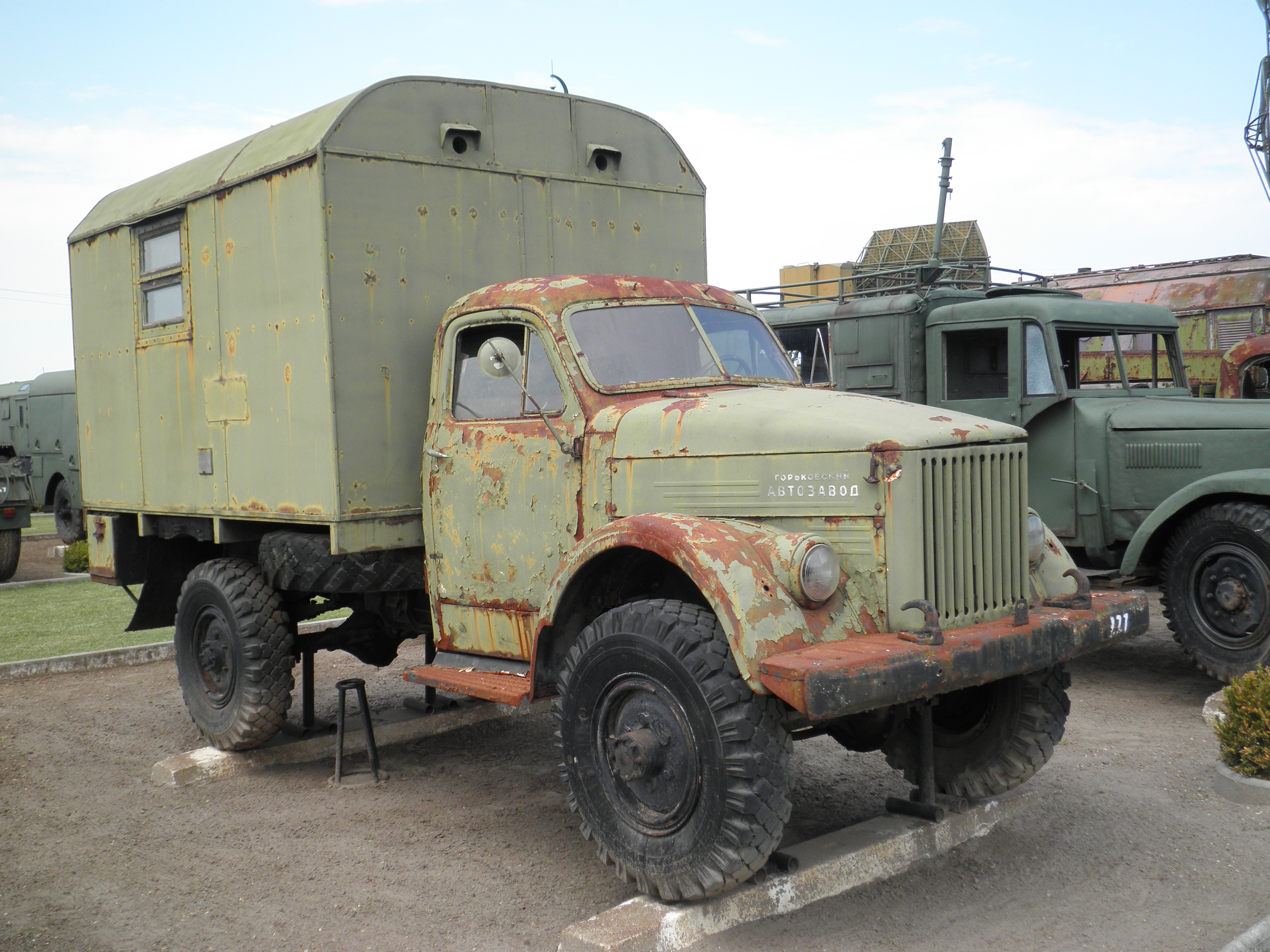
GAZ-63 from the former stocks of the Hungarian army (2011)

The GAZ-63 (Russian: ГАЗ-63) is a light truck with four-wheel drive by the Soviet vehicle manufacturer Gorkovsky Avtomobilny Zavod. It is a development from before the Second World War and is based on the GAZ-51, which does not have all-wheel drive.

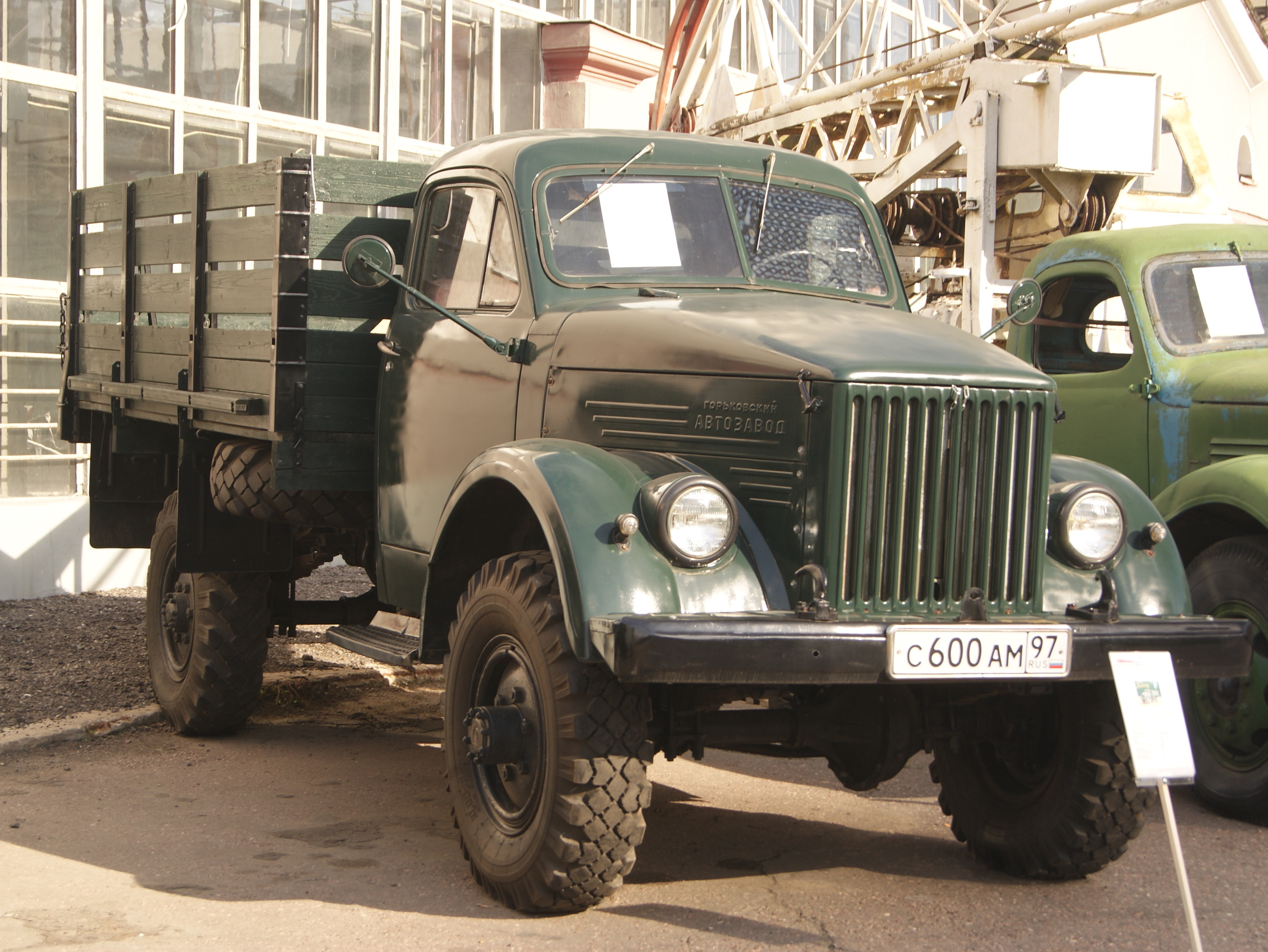
GAZ-63 truck

Apart from these, it is largely identical to the GAZ-51, and only differs in that it has single rear tires (instead of double rear tires) and all-wheel drive. It was designed in the 1940s, and shared the same cab, engine, and many mechanical parts. It was built until 1968, when it was replaced by the new and more modern GAZ-66, with which it shared no components or parts. The GAZ-63 was used in the Soviet Army as a transport vehicle, but also for special superstructures such as the BM-14 projectile launcher.

The GAZ-63 served as the basis for the BTR-40 armoured personnel carrier.

A version based on the GAZ-63 is known as the Sungri 61 in North Korea.

== Technical data ==
Comparison between GAZ-51 and GAZ-63
Model	GAZ-51A	GAZ-63A
Cabin seating	1+1	
Configuration	4×2	4×4
Weight (empty)	2,710 kg (5,970 lb)	3,490 kg (7,690 lb)
Max load	2,500 kg (5,500 lb) (road); 2,000 kg (4,400 lb) (dirt road); N/A (cross-country)	2,000 kg (4,400 lb) (road); N/A (dirt road); 1,500 kg (3,300 lb) (cross-country)
Towed load	3,500 kg (7,700 lb) (road); 1,200 kg (2,600 lb) (dirt road); N/A (cross-road)	2,000 kg (4,400 lb) (road); N/A (dirt road); 2,000 kg (4,400 lb) (cross-road)
Load area	3.07×2.07 m (10.1×6.8 ft)	2.94×1.99 m (9 ft 8 in×6 ft 6 in)
Length	5.715 m (18.75 ft)	5.8 m (19 ft)
Width	2.28 m (7 ft 6 in)	2.2 m (7 ft 3 in)
Height	2.28 m (7 ft 6 in) (cab); 2.13 m (7 ft 0 in) (tarpaulin cover)	2.245 m (7 ft 4.4 in)
Max speed	70 km/h (43 mph)	65 km/h (40 mph)
Range	450 km (280 mi)	650 km (400 mi)
Fuel capacity	90 L (20 imp gal; 24 US gal)	195 L (43 imp gal; 52 US gal)
Engine	GAZ-51A 6-cylinder in-line gasoline developing 70 hp (52 kW) at 2,800 rpm	
Suspension	Leaf spring with hydraulic 2-way telescopic shock absorbers	Leaf spring with articulated shock absorbers
Batteries	12 V 2× ST-70 (6 V each)	

== Operators ==
- Albania
- China − GAZ-51 and GAZ-63. Produced the latter locally as the NJ-230
- Cuba
- Hungary
- North Korea − Produced locally as the Victory-58
- Poland − Produced locally as the FSC Lublin-51
- Romania
- Soviet Union − Replaced by the GAZ-66, both GAZ-51 and GAZ-63 remained in use in 1991
- Syria
- Ukraine
- Russia

== Bibliography ==
- Foss, Christopher F; Gander, Terry J, eds. (1991). Jane's Military Vehicles and Logistics: 1991−92 (12th ed.). Coulsdon, Surrey: Jane's Information Group. ISBN 978-0-7106-0950-2.
