= Zakład Samochodów Dostawczych =

- Founded: 1952
- Defunct: 2003
- Headquarters: Nysa, Poland
- Number of employees: over 2 thousand (1990s)

Zakład Samochodów Dostawczych (transl. Commercial Vehicles Plant), more commonly known as ZSD, was a Polish company located in Nysa that produced commercial vehicles. Until 1986, it was an independent company but was later incorporated into the FSO plant in Warsaw.

== History ==
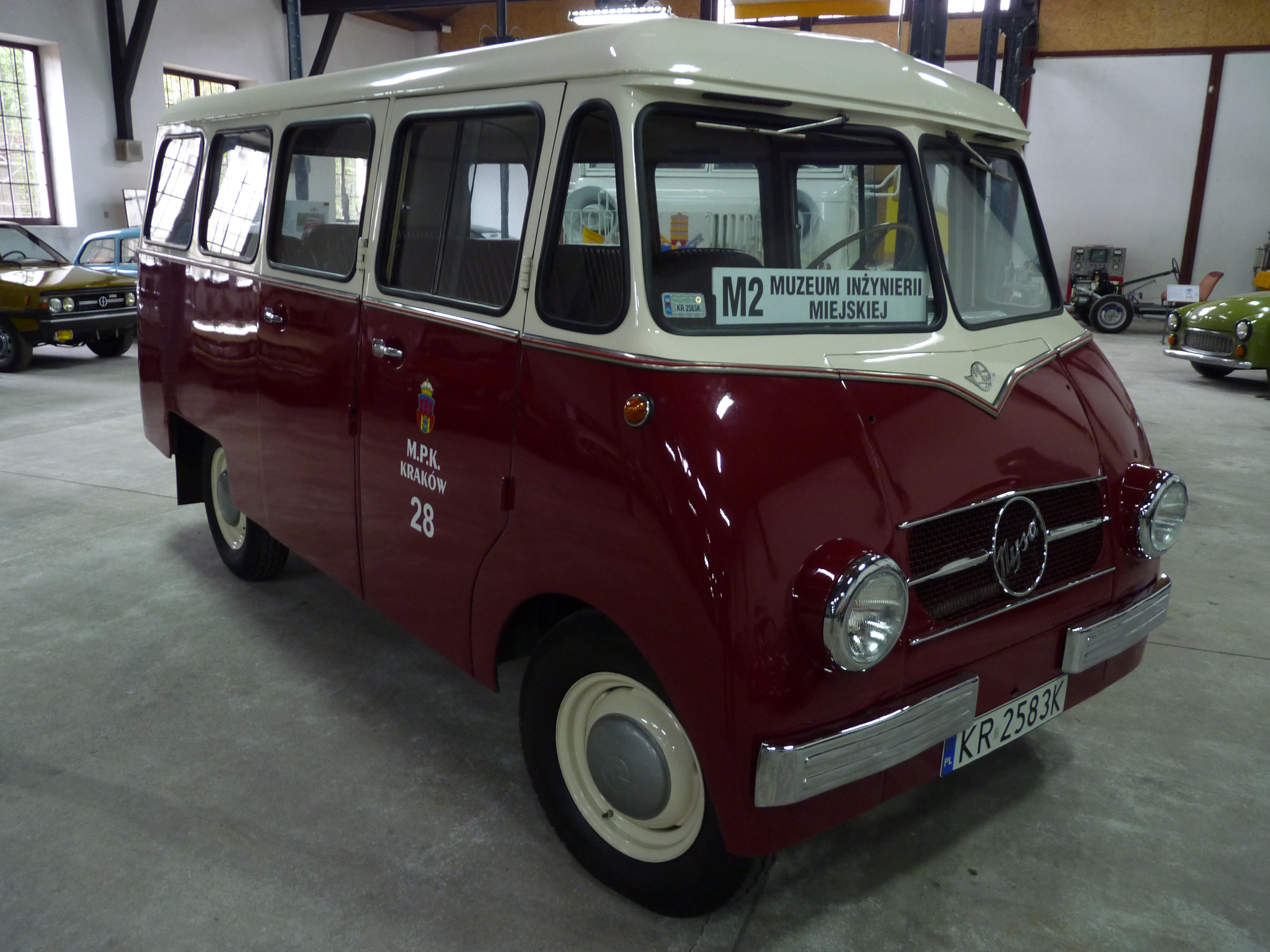
ZSD Nysa N59M

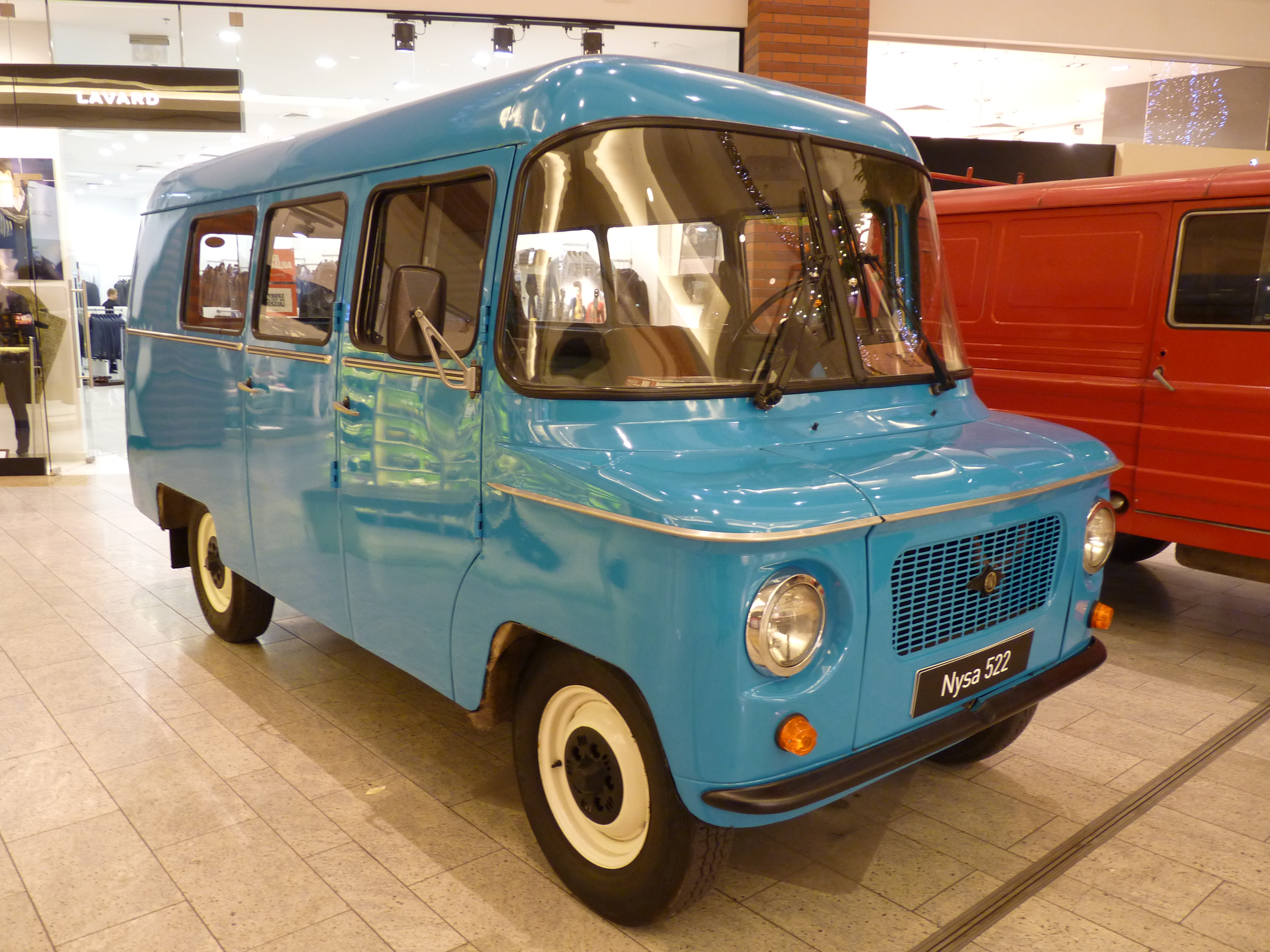
ZSD Nysa 522

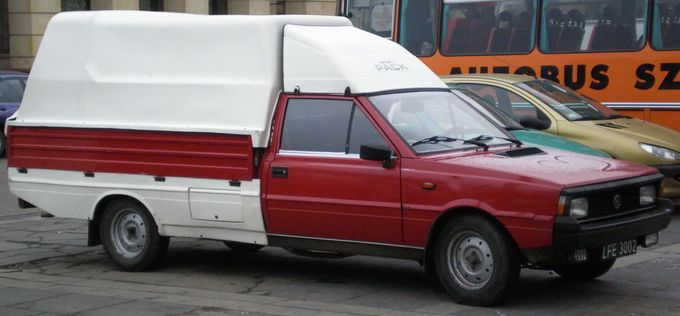
FSO Polonez Truck LB

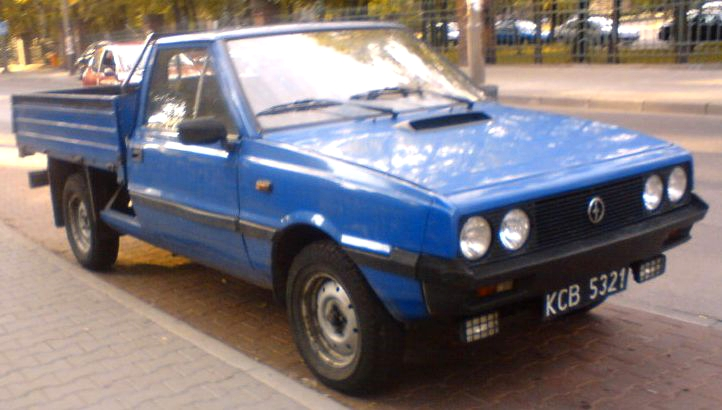
FO Polonez Truck ST

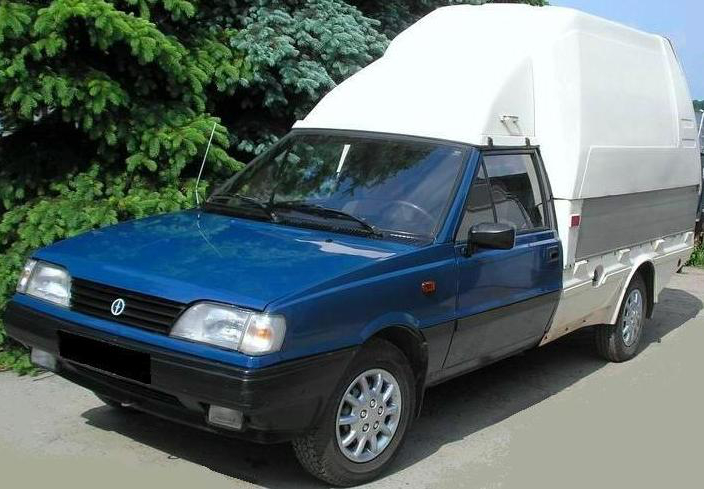
FSO Polonez Truck LB

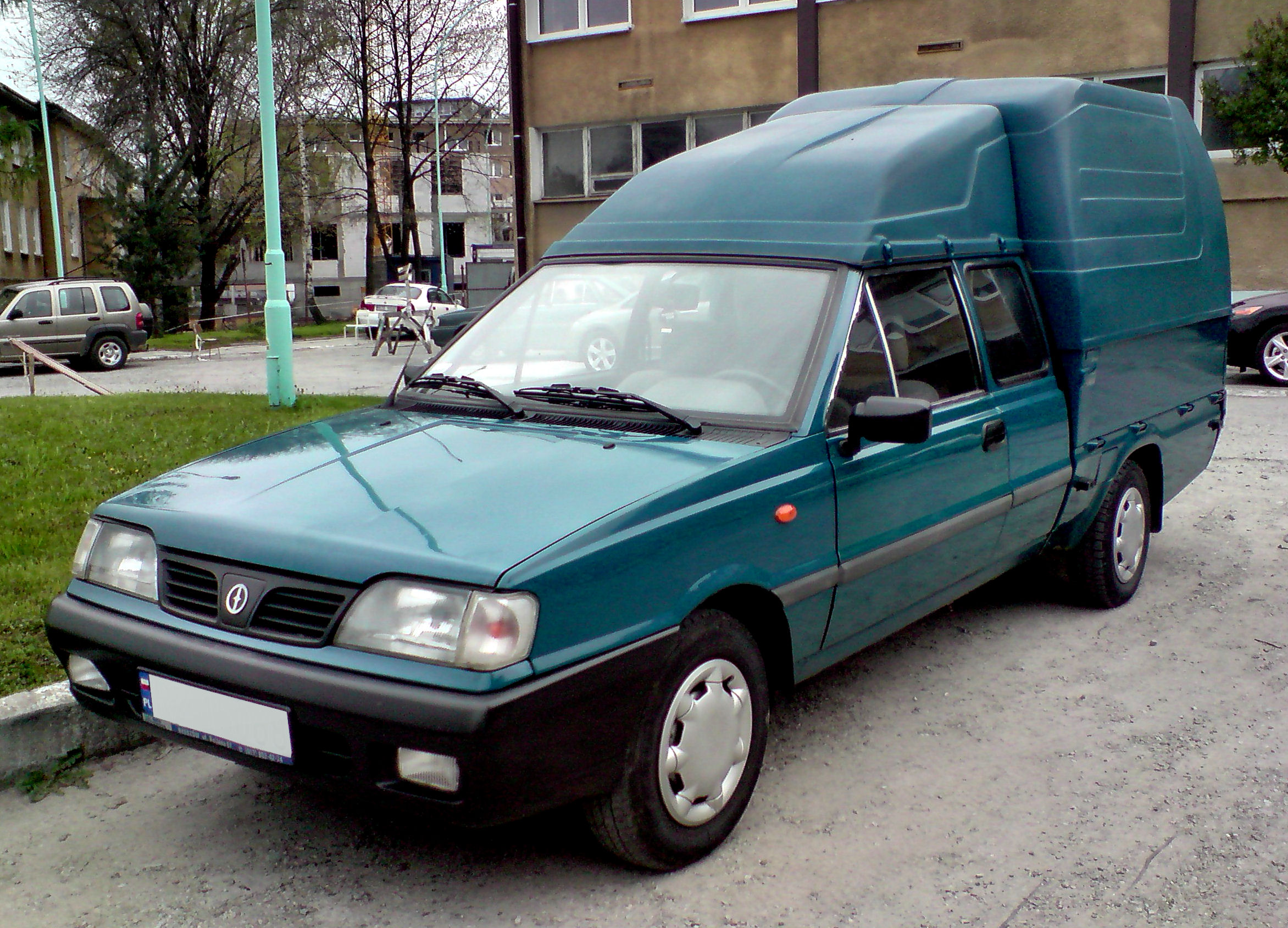
Daewoo-FSO Polonez Truck Plus DC

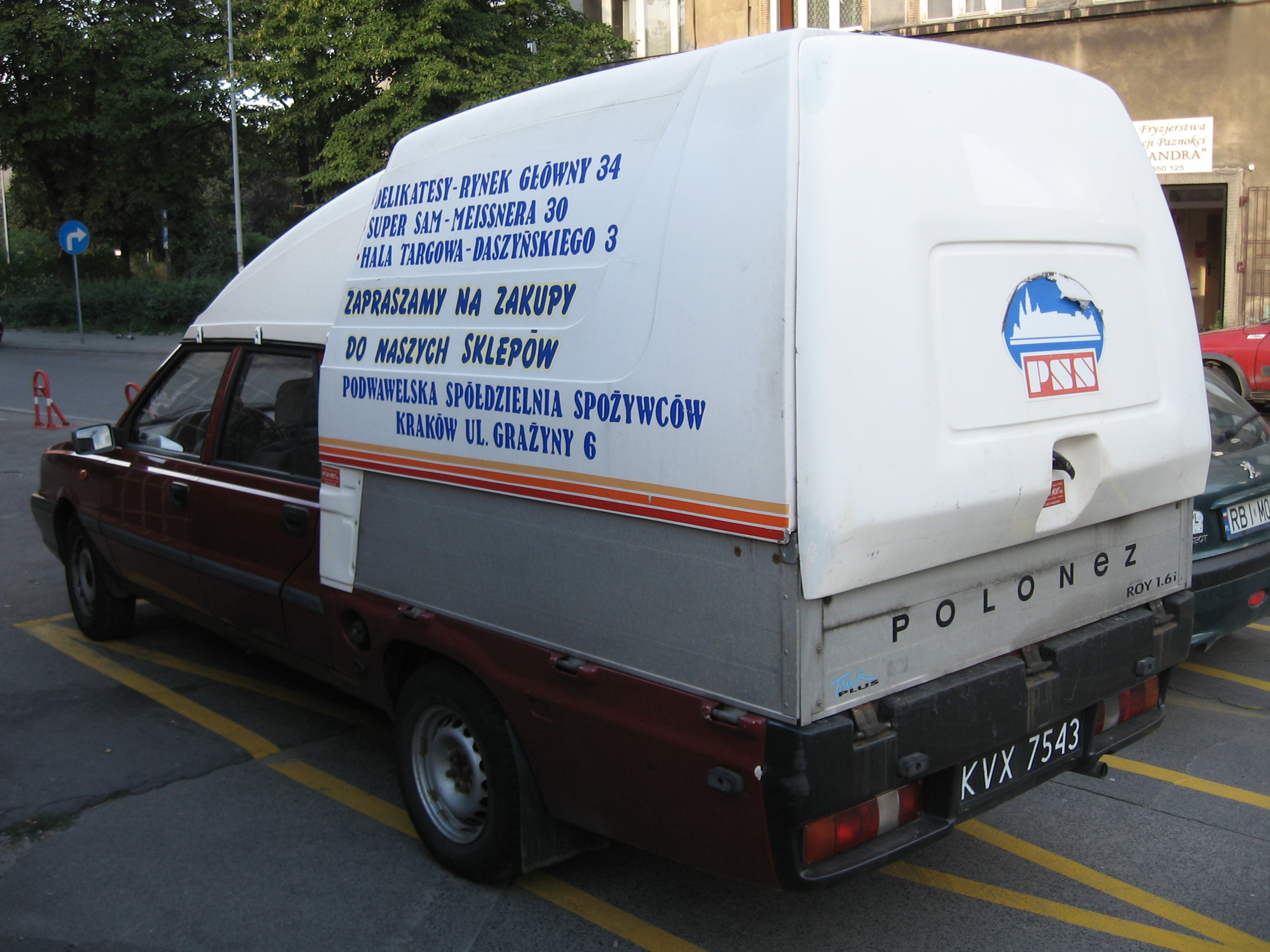
Daewoo-FSO Polonez Truck Plus Roy

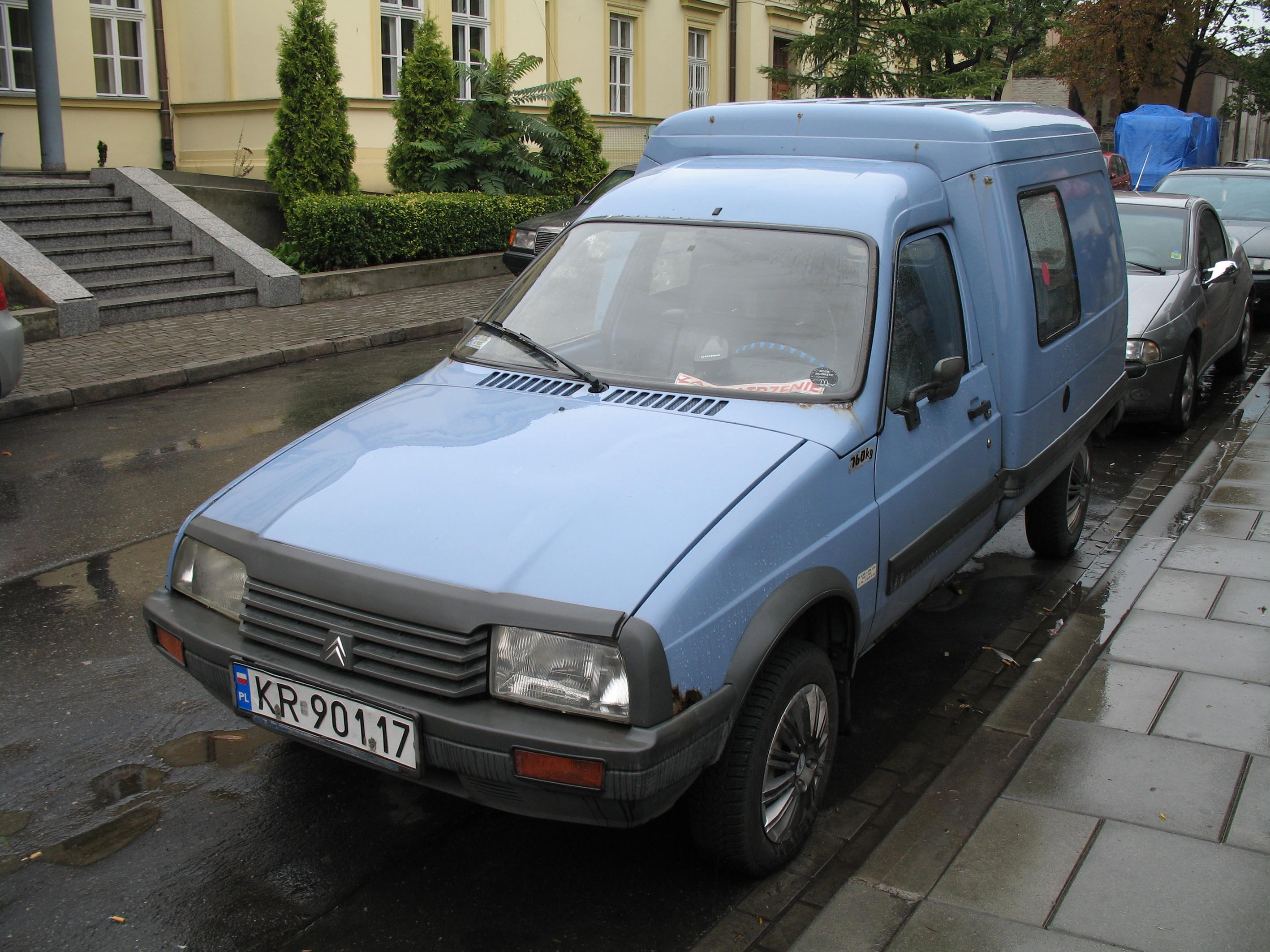
Citroën C15, assembled at ZSD from 1995 to 2001

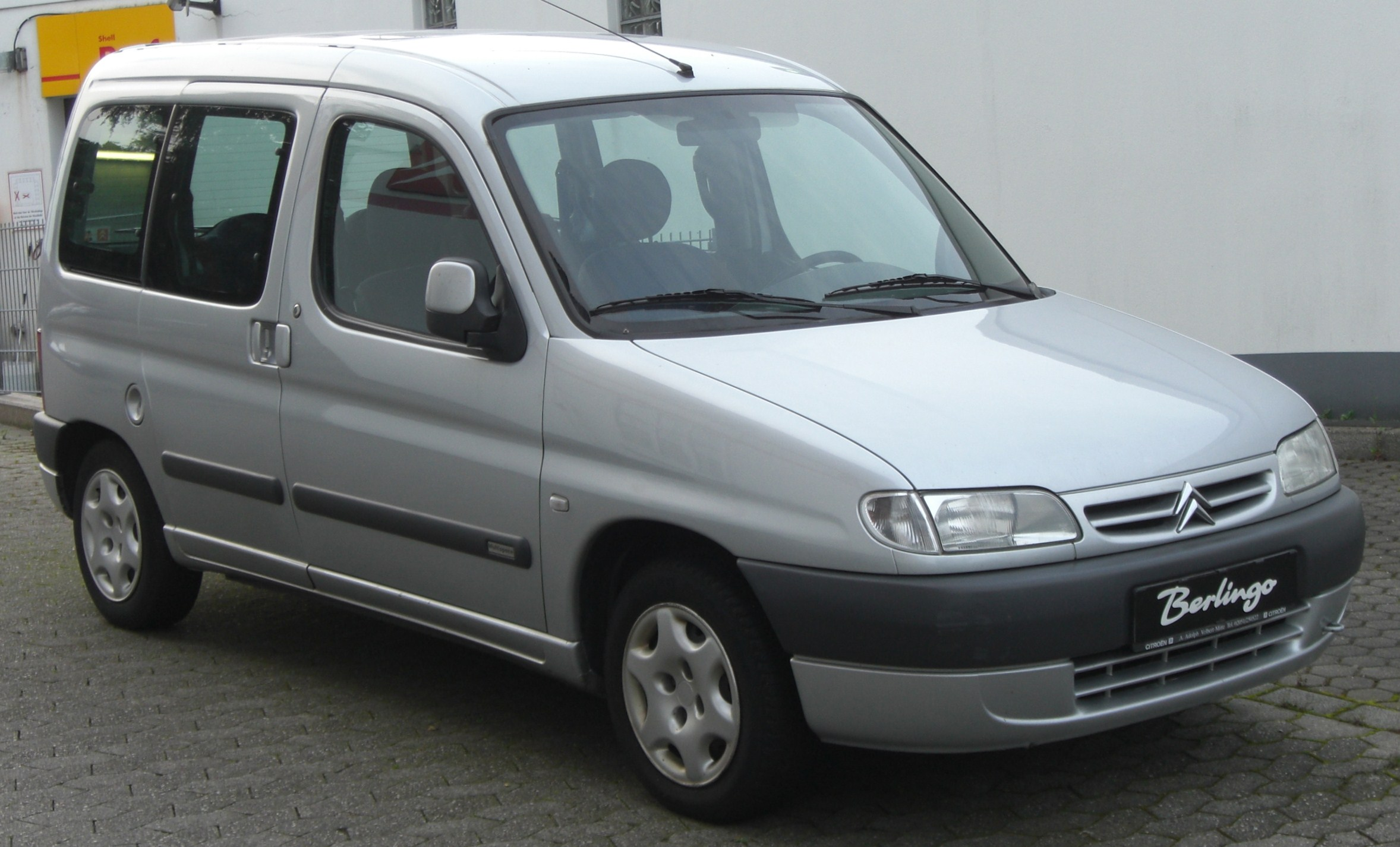
Citroën Berlingo I, assembled at ZSD from 1998 to 2002

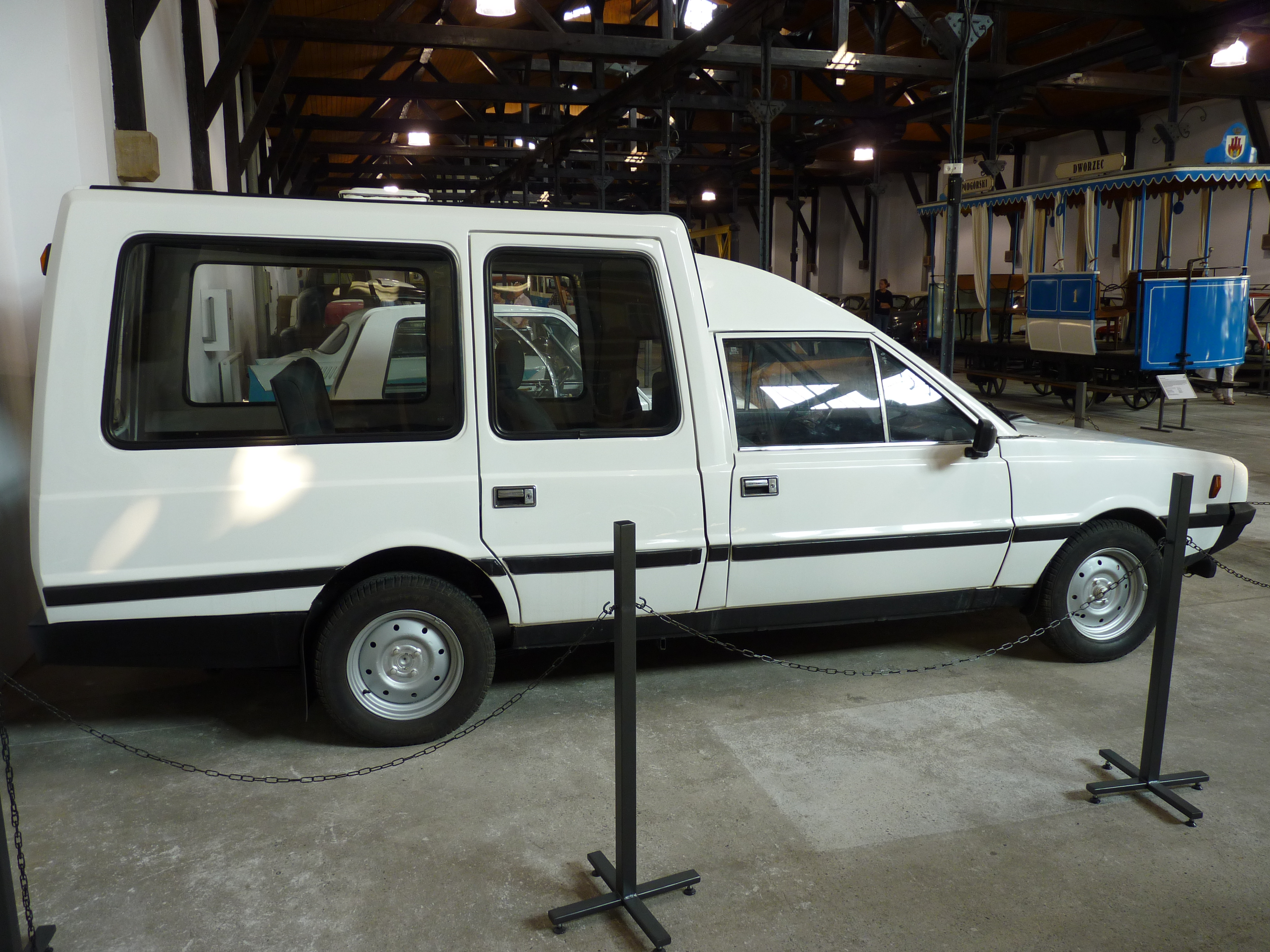
FSO Polonez Van prototype

The origins of the plant date back to 1952, when the "Car Body Construction Plant" was established in Nysa. Previously, in the years 1947–1951, this plant, called the Steel Furniture Factory "Zachód", manufactured hospital beds, chairs, desks, wardrobes and strongboxes. After the decision to change the profile, the development and then production of special and specialized bodies adapted for installation on the chassis of FSC Lublin-51 and Star 20 trucks began. Van bodies for various purposes were built, as well as workshop bodies and traveling cinemas.

In 1953, the expansion of the plant began, which included the construction of a new assembly hall. As Poland developed, the lack of small delivery vehicles with a load capacity of up to 1,000 kg became more noticeable. Cars of this type were not manufactured anywhere in Poland or in neighbouring countries at that time. At the turn of 1956–1957, it was decided to start work on just such a vehicle. This is how the ZSD Nysa was created. In the second half of the 1980s, the factory was incorporated into Fabryka Samochodów Osobowych (FSO) from Warsaw. It launched the production of the FSO Polonez Truck model.

In 1994, ZSD ended the production of Nysa. The years 1996–2002 were the period when the South Korean concern GM Daewoo was the owner. The factory was able to develop, was privatized and produced small delivery vehicles, including the Polonez Truck Plus, and later assembled the Citroën C15 and Berlingo. The problems of the GM Daewoo concern did not go unnoticed by the Nysa plant. The plant began to have serious problems with financial liquidity. There were attempts to save the plant by renaming it Nysa Motor Sp. z o. o. and unsuccessful attempts to transform the plant into an employee-owned company. On June 3, 2002, the Commercial Court in Opole announced the bankruptcy of Nysa Motor. Trade unionists announced that they would not stop the protest. Some people in the plant went on hunger strike. Ultimately, however, the protest action was interrupted. In November 2002, thanks to orders and financing of production by Daewoo dealers, a batch of 166 copies of the Polonez Truck Plus in the Roy version with a 1.9D engine was produced from parts remaining in the manufacturer's warehouses. Production was resumed once again in March 2003 also thanks to the financing of production by sellers, which consisted in paying for the cars before the production process was resumed. This is how the last batch of 288 Truck Plus Polonez's were created.

== Timeline ==
- June 12, 1948 - the Steel Furniture Factory - "Zachód" was established in Nysa, where steel furniture such as wardrobes, strongboxes, etc. was produced.
- 1952 - the production profile was changed to the construction of special car bodies (including cinema cars, transportable buffets) on the chassis of Lublin-51 and Star.
- 1954 - the name was changed to "Zakłady Samochodowe". Production of special cars continued until 1958.
- Five months later, the name was changed again to "Zakłady Budowy Nażużu Samochodowych w Nysa" (colloquially: Bodywork).
- 1957 - a decision was made to launch the production of delivery vehicles in Nysa based on components of the FSO Warszawa.
- 1958 - serial production of the Nysa N-58 began. In addition to the basic minibus variant, ambulances and tows were also created.
- 1959–1969 – there was a continuous modernization process of the ZSD Nysa. Production increased and the range of varieties increased.
- 1968 - the company became part of the Polmo union, the name of the plant was changed to the "Polmo" Commercial Vehicle Factory in Nysa (colloquially FSD and Polmo).
- 1970–1985 – the ZSD Nysa dominated the Polish commercial vehicle market. Production reached the ceiling of 2,500 cars per month, half of which were exported. In the 1970s, the factory experienced its greatest prosperity. Nysa cars were exported to 35 countries. The recipients included countries such as: Iraq, Sudan, China, Egypt, Ghana, Colombia, Ecuador, France, Spain, West Germany and the former Comecon countries.
- 1986–1995 – The process of merging the factory with FSO was in progress, it became the FSO plant, the factory was named Passenger Car Factory, Commercial Vehicle Plant in Nysa (colloquially ZSD).
- 1986 - the decision was made to build a new delivery vehicle based on components of the FSO Polonez.
- 1988 – launch of series production of FSO Polonez Trucks.
- 1992 - director Marian Smutkiewicz, M.A., was delegated to Nysa from FSO - he introduced a recovery program that brought the desired results in a short time. The production proportion has been reversed - the dominant product was the delivery model Polonez - Truck. A new version of the Polonez Truck, based on the Caro passenger model, went into production.
- February 3, 1994 - the last Nysa, number 380 575, rolled off the assembly line. The plant was modernized, which culminated in the construction of a new body cataphoresis line. In April, a contract was signed with the French company Citroën for the assembly of the Citroën C15 delivery van.
- 1995 - assembly of the Citroën C15 car was launched (2- and 5-seater versions). A new cataphoresis line was built, combined with the installation of a computer-controlled sewage treatment plant.
- 1996-1999 – partnership with the South Korean concern Daewoo.
- 1996-1997 – boiler rooms were modernized (stage I and II).
- 1996 - a strategic partner - the international South Korean concern Daewoo - joined the company with FSO, while the plant in Nysa became one of the branches of the company called Daewoo-FSO Motor Spółka z o. o. - ZSD Nysa.
- 1997 - Daewoo-FSO Polonez Truck Plus, modernized in line with the "Plus" line, entered production.
- 1998 – renegotiation of the contract with Citroën: start of assembly of the Citroën Berlingo (2-seater and 5-seater).

Obtaining the ISO 9002 certificate and obtaining the title of "Cleaner Production" in Poland for 1998. The factory featured a new assembly line for Citroën cars and a modern surface painting shop.

- 1999 - modernization of the Polonez Truck Plus, after which it received the commercial designation P-105. Beginning of assembly of Citroën Berlingo cars with sliding doors.
- 2001 – the company "Nysa Motor Spółka z ograniczoną odpowiedzialnością" was registered in the National Court Register.
- June 2002 – production of Polonez Truck Plus was suspended.
- November 2002 - restart of Truck Plus production, thanks to orders and financing of production by GM Daewoo dealers, a batch of 166 ROY versions with a 1.9D engine were produced from parts remaining in the manufacturer's warehouses.
- March 2003 - production was resumed once again, also thanks to the sellers financing the production by paying for the cars before the production process was resumed. This is how the last batch of 288 Truck Plus Polonez's were created.
- May 2003 - the Polska Fabryka Samochodów company was established, which was to produce the Clic city car and the Polonez Truck Plus at the Nysa Motor plant, and at a later stage its highly modernized version of the Poltruck.
- 2004 - the bankruptcy of the PFS company, which leased production halls from Nysa Motor, but was in debt to it due to non-payment of the lease.
- 2007 - "Nysa Motor spółka z ograniczoną odpowiedzialnością" was removed from the National Court Register.
