= Gorky Park =

Gorky Park may refer to:

== Parks ==
- A number of parks in the former USSR, all named after Maxim Gorky:
  - Gorky Park (Moscow)
  - Gorky Park (Minsk), Belarus
  - Gorky Park (Rostov-on-Don)
  - Gorky Park (Taganrog), Rostov oblast
  - Central Park (Almaty), also known as Gorky Park

=== Former parks ===
- The Park of Maxim Gorky (Kharkiv), Ukraine was renamed to Central Park of Culture and Recreation in June 2023

== Other ==
- Gorky Park (novel) (1981), book by Martin Cruz Smith
  - Gorky Park (film) (1983), American feature film based on the novel
- Gorky Park (band), Russian hard rock band
  - Gorky Park (album), the debut album of the band
