= FSC Lublin-51 =

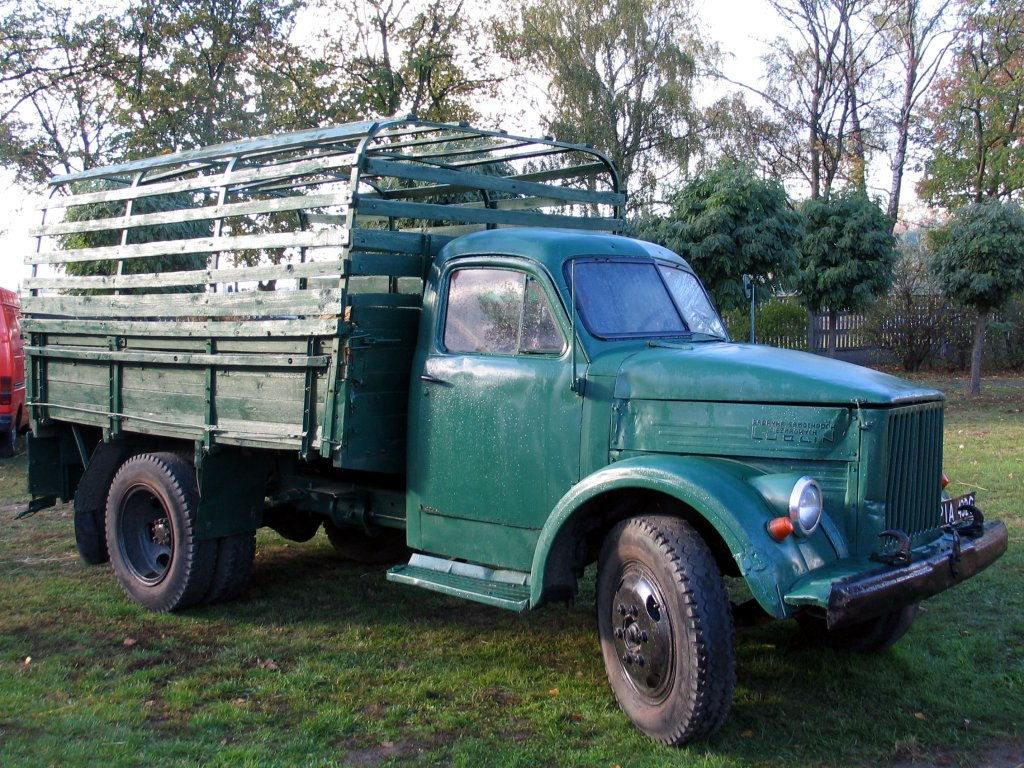

Overview
- Manufacturer: FSC
- Production: November 1951 – June 1959
- Assembly: Poland: Lublin

Body and chassis
- Body style: Truck
- Related: GAZ-51; Star 20

Powertrain
- Engine: 3.5L M-51 I6
- Transmission: 4-speed manual, unsynchronised

Dimensions
- Wheelbase: 3310mm
- Length: 5525mm
- Width: 2200mm
- Height: 2130mm

Chronology
- Successor: FSC Żuk

The FSC Lublin-51 is a Polish small-capacity truck that was a licensed version of the Soviet GAZ-51. Production began on 7 November 1951 and ended in June 1959. The model was replaced by the Polish developed FSC Żuk delivery vehicle. A total of 17,479 examples of the FSC Lublin-51 were produced.

== History ==
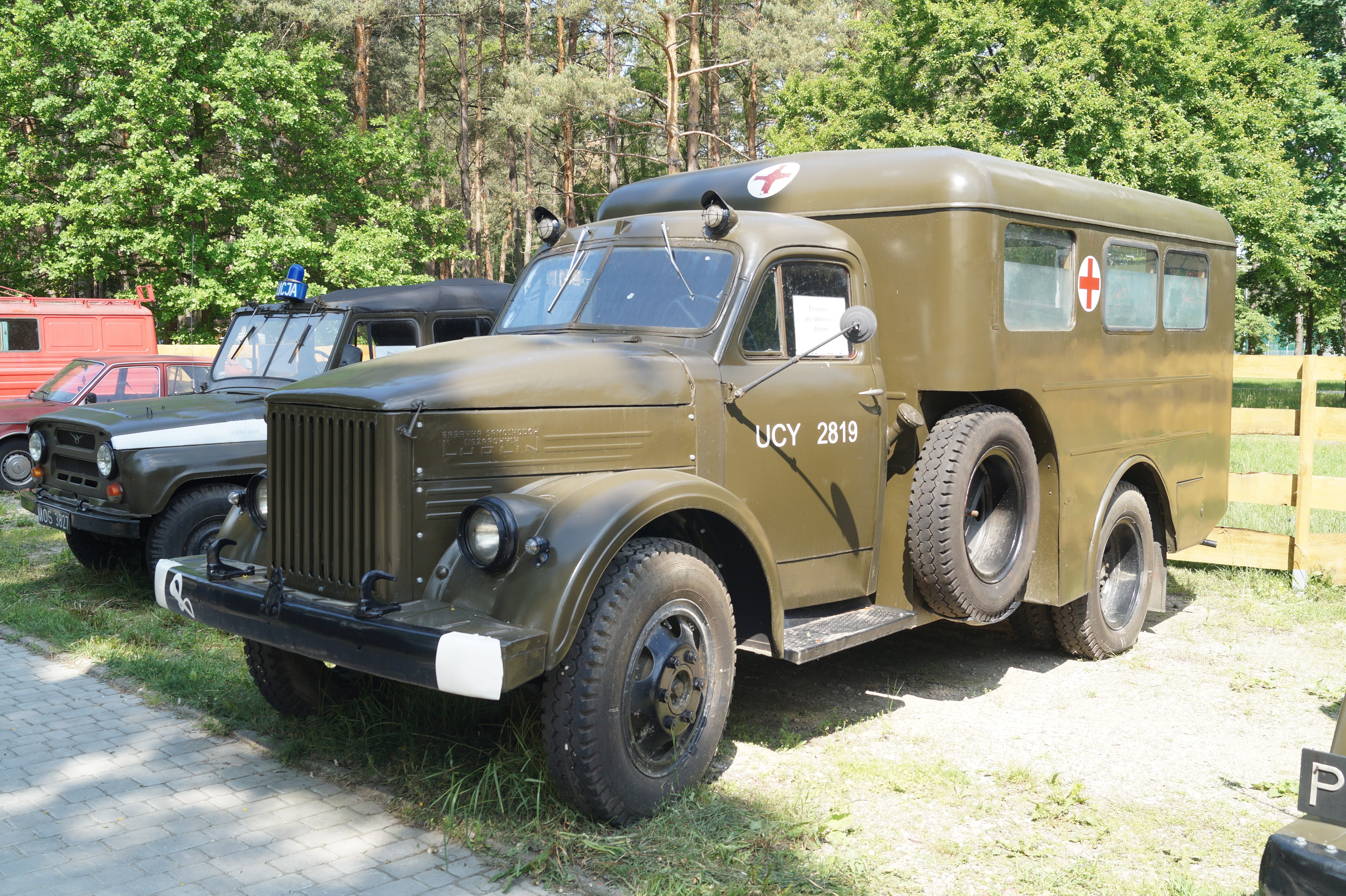
FSC Lublin-51 ambulance

In December 1948, a decision was made to begin production of trucks under the license of the Soviet GAZ-51 model in the pre-war Lilpop, Rau i Loewenstein plants in Lublin. The agreement with the Soviets was signed on 22 July 1950. According to initial assumptions, the plant's annual production was to be approximately 12,000 copies, but at the end of 1950 the production capacity was increased to 25,000 pieces per year. The first copy of this car was assembled on November 7, 1951, from parts supplied by the licensor.

The body of Lublin-51 was mounted on a longitudinal, riveted frame made of pressed sheet metal. The suspension system used a front rigid axle suspended on semi-elliptical leaf springs and two hydraulic arm shock absorbers. At the rear, the drive axle was suspended on semi-elliptical leaf springs, additionally supported by auxiliary leaf springs. This vehicle used a steering gear with a globoid worm. It is powered by an imported 6-cylinder in-line M-51 petrol engine with a capacity of 3,480 cm³ and a maximum power of 51.5 kW (70 HP). This unit is mated to a 4-speed manual, non-synchronised gearbox. The Lublin-51 was equipped with a cabin with the engine extended. The cabin frame is made of wood and covered with waterproof plywood. The side panels, engine hood and fenders were made of steel sheet, while the roof was covered with dermatoid.

Modernizations were carried out during production. A new type of carburetor with a vacuum-controlled saver was used, the vacuum wiper drive system was replaced with electric motors and a fully metal cabin was put into production.

Despite the modernization, it was not possible to eliminate the basic drawbacks of this vehicle: too low load capacity for a truck and high fuel consumption. Production ended in June 1959, after 17,479 units had been produced.

Various versions of bodies were mounted on the chassis of the FSC Lublin-51 model, such as a cargo box, van bodies produced by ZSD in Nysa, bodies for traveling cinemas, repair workshops and sanitary bodies type N-243, produced by Zakłady Budowy Nadwozi Samochodowych in Nysa (Jelcz).

== Technical data ==
Engine type	R6 lower valve, four-stroke M-51
Number of cylinders	6
Displacement	3,480 cm^{3} (212 cu in)
Power	70 HP (51.5 kW) at 2800 rpm
Max torque at rpm	200 N⋅m (150 lbf⋅ft) at 1500 rpm
Max speed	70 km/h (43 mph)
Fuel consumption per 100 km	26 l
Compression ratio	6.2
Transmission	4-speed manual
Curb weight	2,710 kg (5,970 lb)
Permissible gross weight	5,350 kg (11,790 lb)
Tire size	7.50-20"
Brakes	Drum, hydraulic, single-circuit on all wheels
Cylinder diameter	82 mm (3.2 in)
Piston stroke	110 mm (4.3 in)
Wheelbase	1,400 mm (55 in)
Capacity	2.5 t (2.5 long tons; 2.8 short tons)

== Bibliography ==
- Matuszek, Czesław (2008). Historia fabryki samochodów : od Lublina ...do Lublina (in Polish). Lublin: Wydawnictwo Polihymnia. ISBN 978-83-7270-589-1.
- Zieliński, Andrzej (2006). Polskie konstrukcje motoryzacyjne 1947-1960 (in Polish). Warsaw: Wydawnictwa Komunikacji i Łączności. ISBN 978-83-206-1541-8.
- Szelichowski, Stanisław (2003). Sto lat polskiej motoryzacji (in Polish). Kraków: Krakowska Oficyna SAB, 2003. ISBN 83-918699-0-3.
