= Gorky =

Gorky may refer to:

People

- Maxim Gorky (1868–1936), Russian author and political activist, founder of socialist realism
- Arshile Gorky (1904–1948), Armenian-American abstract expressionist painter

Inhabited localities

- Gorky, name of Nizhny Novgorod, Soviet Union, from 1932 to 1990

Other uses

- Gorky Reservoir, on the Volga in Nizhny Novgorod Oblast, Russia
- 2768 Gorky, asteroid
- Gorky, original band of Luc De Vos and predecessor of his subsequent band Gorki
  - Gorky, their first album

== See also ==
- Gorki (disambiguation)
- Górki (disambiguation), various locations in Poland
- Gorky Park (disambiguation)
- Gorky Film Studio, Moscow
- Gorky's Zygotic Mynci, Welsh indie band, 1991–2006
  - Gorky 5, their fifth album
- Gorky 17 (aka Odium), turn-based tactics computer game
