= Gorky Park (Rostov-on-Don) =

Urban park in Rostov-on-Don, Russia

- Previously known as Gorodskoy garden
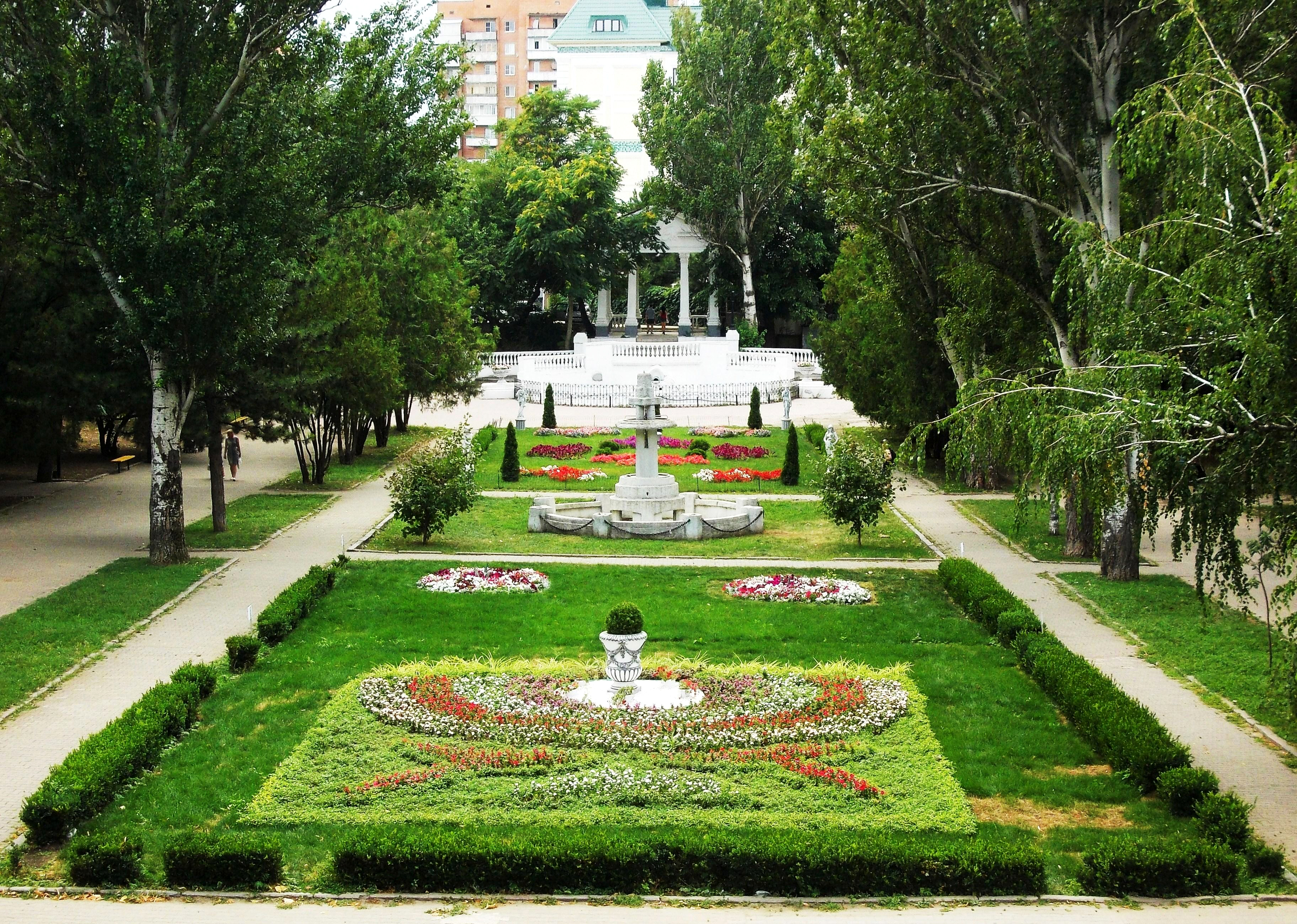
- Mainstream of the Gorky Park
- Interactive map of Gorky Park
- Location: Rostov-on-Don, Rostov oblast Russia
- Coordinates: 47°13′21.2″N 39°42′36″E
- Opened: 1813
- Area: 12.2 hectares (30 acres)

Gorky Central Park of Culture and Leisure (Russian: Центральный парк культуры и отдыха имени Горького, romanized: Tsentralny park kultury i otdykha imeni Gorkogo, IPA: [tsɨnˈtralʲnɨj ˈpark kʊlʲˈturɨ i ˈoddɨxə ˈimɪnɪ ˈɡorkova]) is a central urban park in Rostov-on-Don, Rostov oblast, Russia, named after Maxim Gorky. It is the eldest park in Rostov-on-Don. The park was established in 1813 on the skirts of the city. Now it is located in center of Rostov-on-Don between Pushkinskaya street (Gorky Park North), Bolshaya Sadovaya street (Gorky Park South), Budyonovskiy avenue (Gorky Park West) and Semashko lane (Gorky Park East). Since 1998 the park is protected as an object of cultural heritage of regional value.

== History ==
The park was established in washes, where dirty streams ran and the location of the town dump. The Mayor of Rostov-on-Don, Alexander Yashchenko, owned the parcel of land and donated it to the city magistrate. Different private organizations improved the territory, planting the first trees, shrubs, and other plants. There were several gardens initially, which were combined into the new urban park. The so-called Lower Park (Nizhny Park) and Upper Park (Verhny Park) are delineated by the terrain.

A wooden building of the first Municipal Theatre opened in the northern side of the park in the 1840s. Wooden rotunda to relax of citizens was erected in 1864. It was replaced by stone building located on Pushkinskaya street alongside of main park entrance in 1893. Architect Nikolai Doroshenko designed an open-work fence and front entrance constructed in the shape of fortress gates. New entrance was located on Bolshaya Sadovaya street. Architect Vladimir Shkitko projected the first fountain in Rostov-on-Don called 'Boy with basin'. The opening ceremony was held in conjunction with relocation of the town council to new building (Maximov house). The fountain was officially opened by projector of water pipe Timofey Petrovich Kuska. Pool and arbors were decorated with sculptures opened in middle porch of the park. At the Lower Park was a stone grotto, reservoir with alive swans and fountains. Flower ornaments were regularly renovated. A large area of new exotic plants and flowers was laid out. Palm trees and tamarisks were brought from abroad.

== Description ==
The park, with a perimeter of 1.66 km (1.03 mi), occupies an area of 12.2 hectares (30 acres). While planting and land form in much of the park appear natural, it is in fact almost entirely landscaped. The park contains extensive walking tracks, seven fountains, rotunda, playgrounds, amusement rides, cafe, chess pavilion and parkways decorated with sculptures. Indoor attractions include observatory, Monument to Lenin and Monument of the Great October Revolution. In addition there are open-air gallery in which hosts expositions of applied art and works by Rostov artists.
