= Gorki =

Gorki may refer to:

- Maxim Gorki (1868–1936), Russian author
- Gorki Águila (b. 1968), Cuban rock musician
- Gorki (band), a Belgian band of Luc De Vos
- Gorki (Kazan Metro), a station of the Kazan Metro, Kazan, Russia
- Gorki Ridge, a ridge in Antarctica
- Gorki, Russia, several inhabited localities in Russia
- Horki, a town in Belarus

== See also ==
- Górki (disambiguation), several locations in Poland
- Gorky (disambiguation)
- Horki (disambiguation)
