= Malye Gorki, Vladimir Oblast =

Malye Gorki Малые Горки
- Village
- Location within Vladimir Oblast Location within Russia
- Coordinates: 56°01′N 39°06′E
- Country: Russia
- Region: Vladimir Oblast
- District: Petushinsky District
- Time zone: UTC+3:00

Malye Gorki (Russian: Малые Горки) is a rural locality (a village) in Nagornoye Rural Settlement, Petushinsky District, Vladimir Oblast, Russia. The population was 11 as of 2010.

== Geography ==
Malye Gorki is located 35 km northwest of Petushki (the district's administrative centre) by road. Bolshiye Gorki is the nearest rural locality.
