= GAZ-53 =

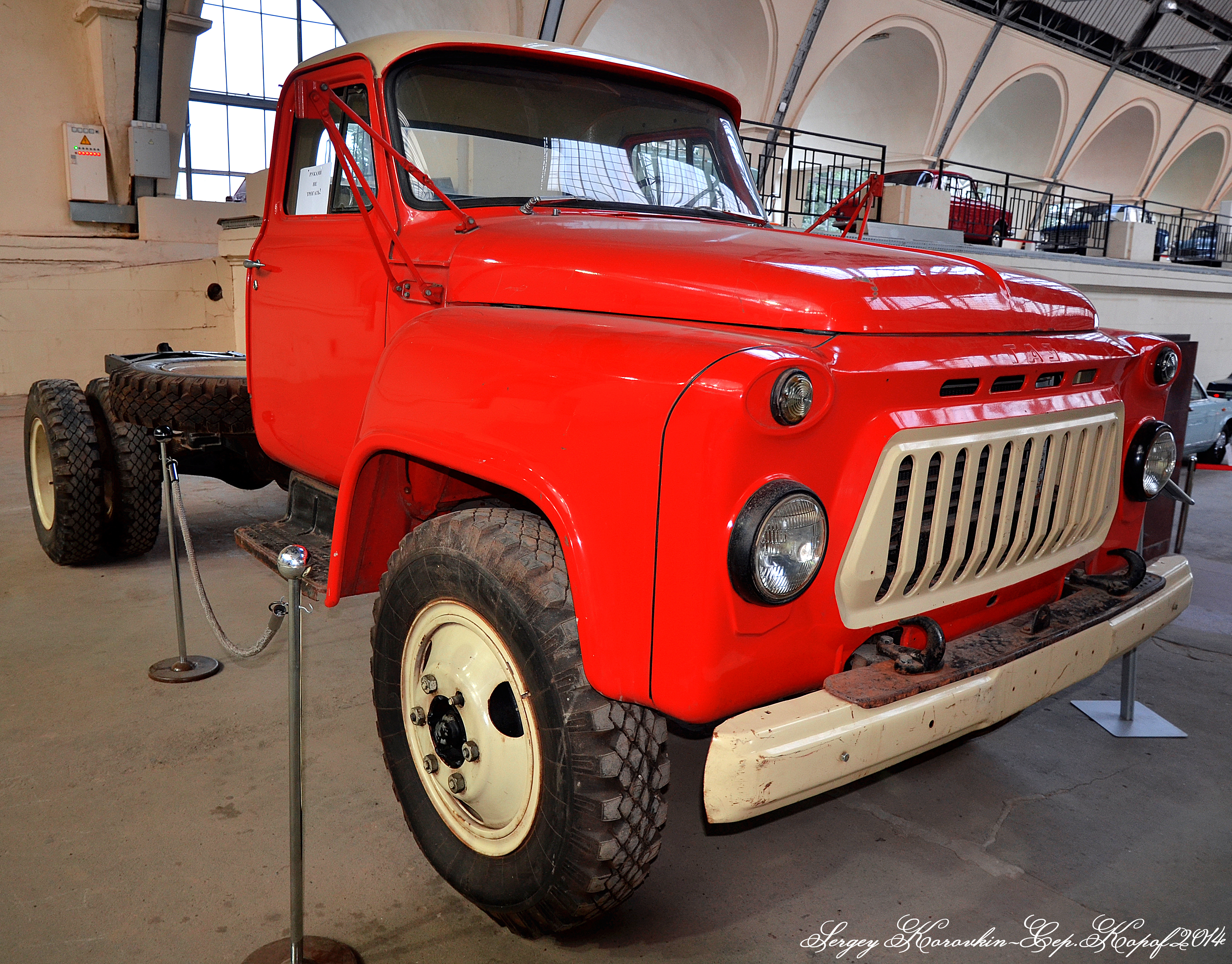
- GAZ-53

Overview
- Manufacturer: GAZ
- Also called: GAZ-52
- Production: 1961–1993
- Assembly: Soviet Union / Russia: Gorky (Nizhny Novgorod)

Body and chassis
- Class: Truck
- Body style: 2-door standard cab 4-door double cab (fire engines only)
- Layout: Front engine layout

Powertrain
- Engine: 3.5L GAZ-51 I6 (1961-1964, after that only on GAZ-52 variant); 4.3L ZMZ-53 V8 (1964-1993)
- Transmission: 4-speed manual

Dimensions
- Wheelbase: 3,700 mm (145.7 in)
- Length: 6,395 mm (251.8 in)
- Width: 2,379 mm (93.7 in)
- Height: 2,190–2,219 mm (86.2–87.4 in)
- Curb weight: 2,989–3,260 kg (6,590–7,187 lb)

Chronology
- Predecessor: GAZ-51
- Successor: GAZ-3307

The GAZ-53 is a 3.5 tonne 4×2 truck produced by GAZ between 1961 and 1993. Introduced first as GAZ-53F, it was joined by the virtually identical 2.5-ton GAZ-52 in 1962, which was produced until 1989.

The GAZ-52 and GAZ-53 trucks are distinguished by different lighting systems, wheel rims and tonnage (payload): the GAZ-52 was able to carry up to 2.5 tonnes of cargo, whereas the GAZ-53A could carry up to 4 tonnes. From 1961 to 1975 the new truck range was produced along with its predecessor, the GAZ-51.

Given the long production run of GAZ-52/53 and their variants, the series is a common sight in Eastern Europe. They should not be mistaken for the broadly similar 5-6 ton ZIL-130, which is also usually painted light blue with a white grille. The GAZ grille is fluted vertically, and the direction indicators are typically located above the headlamps, with the exception of the introductory GAZ-53F. The ZIL has a horizontally slated grille and its flashers are located below the headlamps.

== History ==
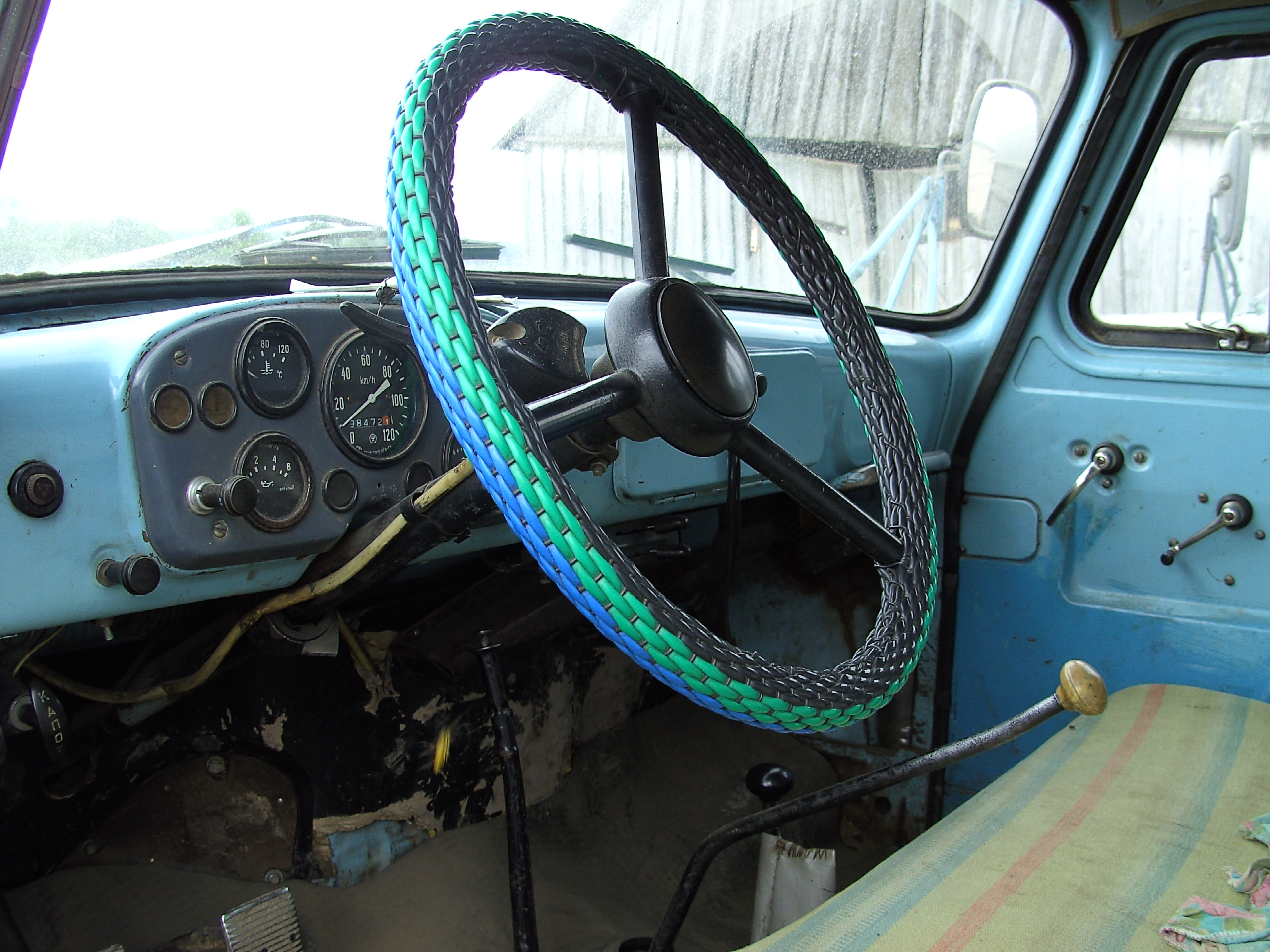
Interior

The GAZ-52 and GAZ-53 truck range was designed during the 1950s. The first prototype of the GAZ-52 was built in 1956. It initially was just a modernized GAZ-51 with a new front end and was built on the same chassis and engine, it retained a payload of 2.5 tons. In 1958, a completely new cab was developed which was inspired by contemporary American trucks. Further prototypes were built, increasing the wheelbase from 3300 mm to 3700 mm while the length became 6,395 mm. Under the designation GAZ-52F, the plant produced a series of 300 trucks from 1958 to 1959. From 1959 to 1964, various other prototypes were produced, but none of them went into series production.

In the 1960s, the GAZ-53 was developed. A heavier variant with a 3.5 ton payload and a brand-new 4254 cc light-alloy V8 ZMZ-53 engine, which was based on the one used in the GAZ-13 Chaika. The ZMZ-53 produces 120 hp SAE Gross at 3200 rpm, giving the GAZ-53 a top speed of 90 km/h (56 mph). Early versions, called GAZ-53F, were powered by an old 75-hp (SAE Gross) six-cylinder engine from the GAZ-51 truck; but since 1964, the GAZ-53 was equipped with a 4.3L ZMZ-53 V8 engine.

Production of the GAZ-53 started in 1961 while the GAZ-52 was not built in mass production until 1966.

Payload was increased to 4 tons in the 1965 model, called GAZ-53A. The GAZ-53A was built until January 1983, when the GAZ-53-12 took over until production ended. All variants use a four-speed gearbox, synchronized on third and fourth. A number of other sub-versions were also introduced, including the military version GAZ-53A-016.

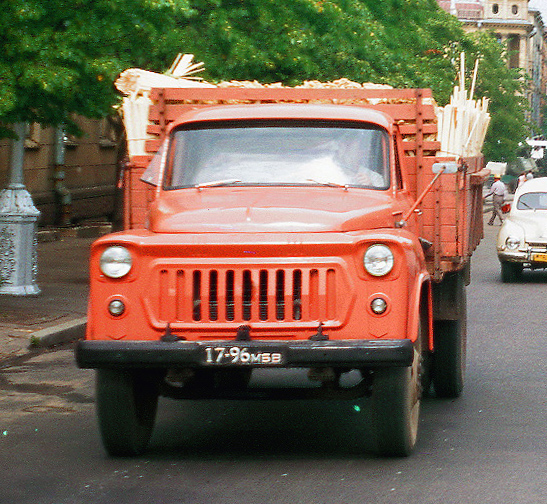
Initial front with headlights up (until 1964)

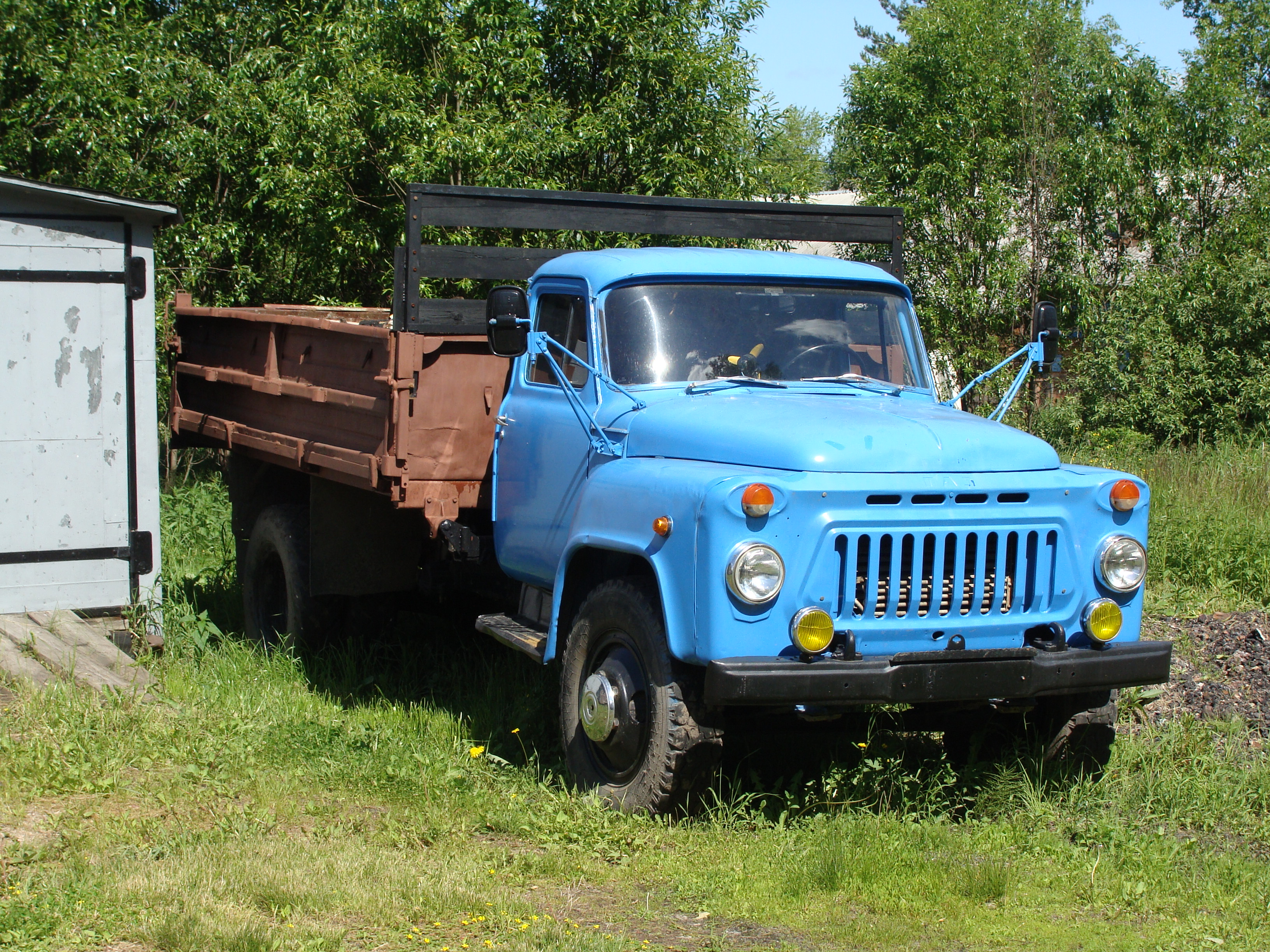
Main front with headlights below (1964-1984)

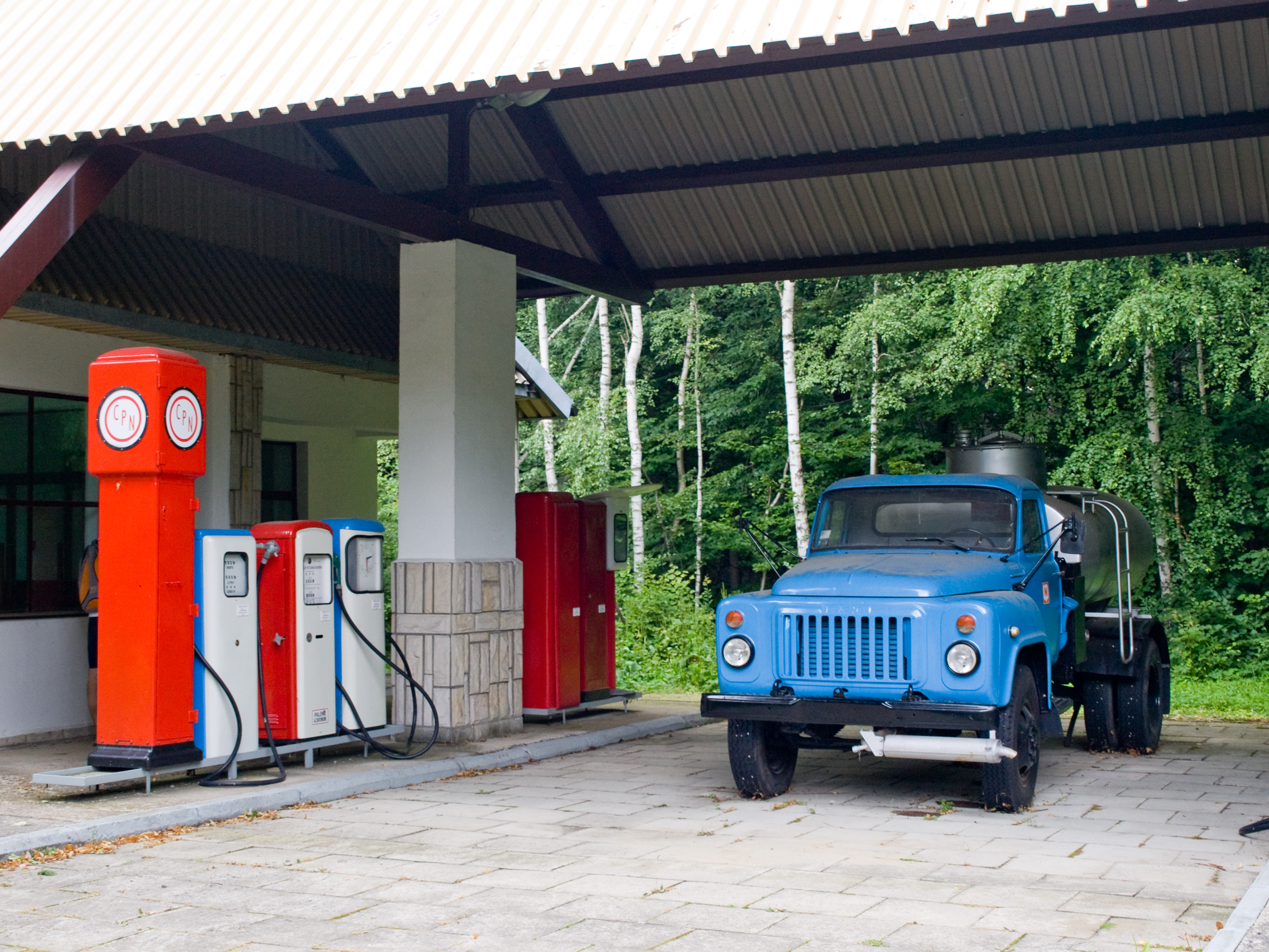
Final, simplified front with square grille (1985-1993)

In total, over 4 million GAZ-53 were built, making it the most produced truck of the Soviet Union.

== Bulgaria ==
The GAZ-53A was also license-built by KTA Madara in Shumen, Bulgaria, beginning in 1967. They were called the Madara 400 series (the "4" representing its four-tonne payload). Beginning in the 1970s, the Bulgarian-built trucks were fitted with locally built four-cylinder 3.9 liter Perkins diesel (later also turbodiesel) engines, made by the Vasil Kolarov engine plant in Varna. These engines had either 80 or 100 PS (59 or 74 kW). Madara built about 3,000 trucks per year throughout the 1980s, which met the needs of the local market.

== Variants ==
=== GAZ-52 ===
- GAZ-52: Prototype initial version.
- GAZ-52F: Prototype version powered by a GAZ-51F stratified charge engine (1958-1959).
- GAZ-52G: Prototype long-wheelbase flatbed version (1959).
- GAZ-52S: Prototype version for Far North climates (1962).
- GAZ-52Ya: Prototype version with tail lift.
- GAZ-52A: Cab-chassis version. Redesignated GAZ-52-01 in 1966.
  - GAZ-52-01-40: Modified version of GAZ-52-01 with no cab.
- GAZ-52-02: Cab-chassis version for dump trucks.
- GAZ-52-03: As GAZ-52-01 but with flatbed.
- GAZ-52-04: Improved GAZ-52-01.
- GAZ-52-05: Cargo-passenger version of GAZ-52-04.
- GAZ-52-06: Tractor unit version.
- GAZ-52-14: Prototype modernized version, powered by a 116 horsepower V6 engine, air-hydraulic brakes and modified trim and cab interior.
- GAZ-52-94: Prototype version for Far North climates.
- GAZ-3302: Planned modernized version of GAZ-52 (1975).

=== GAZ-53 ===
- GAZ-53A: Prototype right hand drive version, intended for export (1962). Designation reused for modernized version of GAZ-53.
- GAZ-53A: Modernized GAZ-53.
- GAZ-53AK: Projected cabover version with 3,700 mm (150 in) wheelbase and 4-ton capacity. Never built.
- GAZ-53F: Version intended to be powered by the GAZ-51F stratified charge engine. Due to numerous engine problems, it was replaced by the GAZ-53F, an updated GAZ-51 engine.
- GAZ-53F1: Experimental flatbed version with 3,500 kg (7,700 lb) payload capacity and a 90 horsepower GAZ-40P engine.
- GAZ-53K: Projected cabover version with 3,300 mm (130 in) wheelbase and 4-ton capacity. Never built.
- GAZ-53N: Military version, based on GAZ-53A.
- GAZ-53P: Cabover tractor unit version. The cab was from the GAZ-66.
- GAZ-53S: Prototype version for Far North climates.
- GAZ-53Sh: Prototype flatbed truck; rebuilt from GAZ-53F1.
- GAZ-53-02: Cab-chassis version for dump trucks.
- GAZ-53-05: Prototype tractor-trailer version.
- GAZ-53-11: Prototype modernized version of GAZ-53A.
- GAZ-53-13: Prototype dump truck chassis, based on GAZ-53-11.
- GAZ-53-40: Open cab-chassis version for buses.
- GAZ-53-55: Prototype tropical climate version of GAZ-53-05.
- GAZ-53-80: Prototype moderate climate version of GAZ-53-05.
- GAZ-53-90: Prototype version for Far North climates, development of GAZ-53S.
