= Górki, Choszczno County =

Górki
- Hamlet (colony)
- Location within Poland
- Coordinates: 53°07′43″N 15°37′36″E
- Country: Poland
- Voivodeship: West Pomeranian
- County: Choszczno
- Municipality: Bierzwnik
- Time zone: UTC+1 (CET)
  - Summer (DST): UTC+2 (CEST)
- Postal code: 73-240
- Area code: +48 95
- Car plates: ZCH

Górki (Polish: [ˈɡur.ki]) is a hamlet (colony) in the West Pomeranian Voivodeship, Poland, located within the municipality of Bierzwnik in Choszczno County.
