= Górki, Kętrzyn County =

Górki
- Settlement
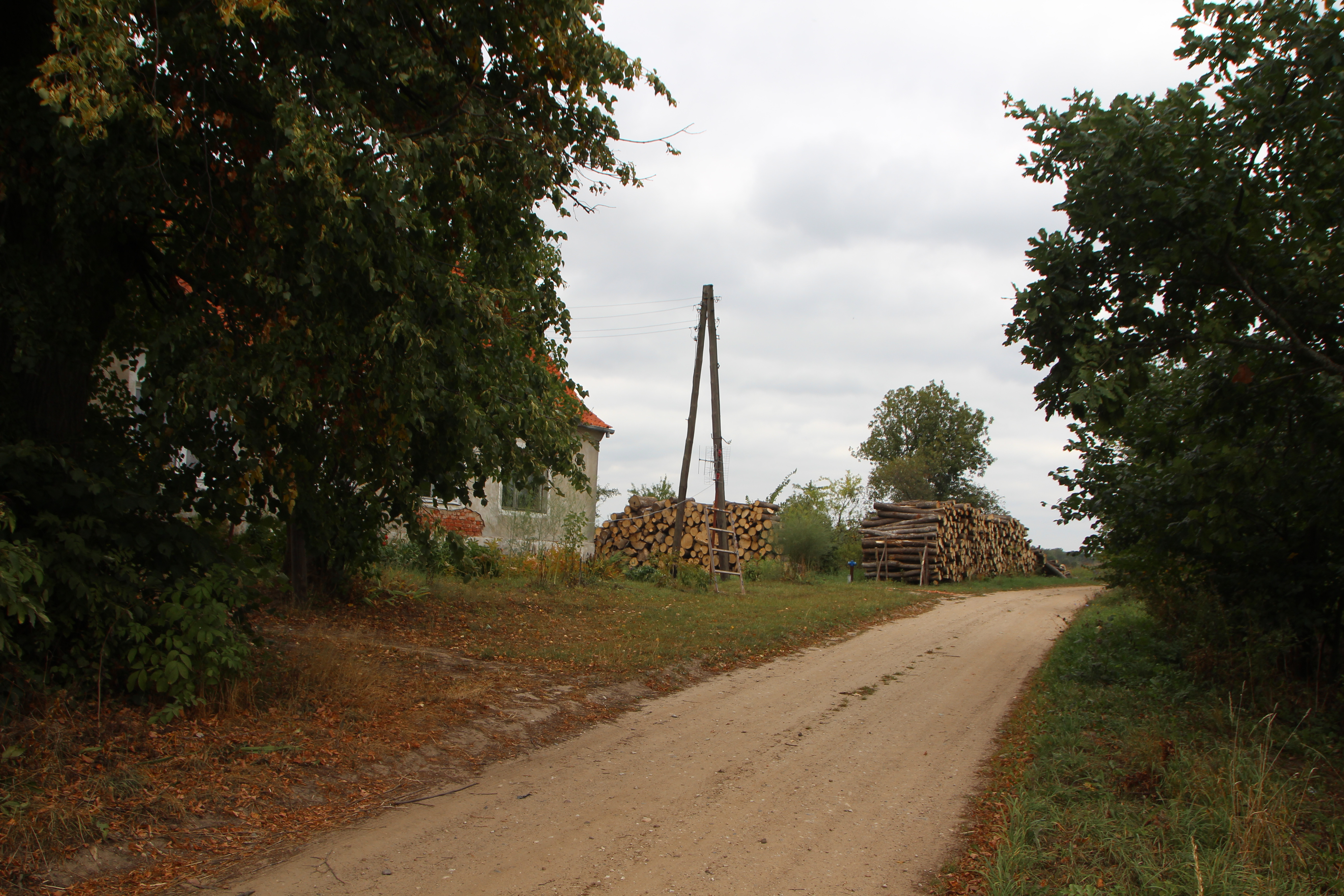
- Gorki (2015)

- Location within Poland
- Coordinates: 54°18′23″N 21°21′5″E
- Country: Poland
- Voivodeship: Warmian-Masurian
- County: Kętrzyn
- Gmina: Barciany

Górki [ˈɡurki] is a settlement in the administrative district of Gmina Barciany, within Kętrzyn County, Warmian-Masurian Voivodeship, in northern Poland, close to the border with the Kaliningrad Oblast of Russia.
