= Monument of the Great October Revolution (Rostov-on-Don) =

- Russian: Памятник Великой Октябрьской революции
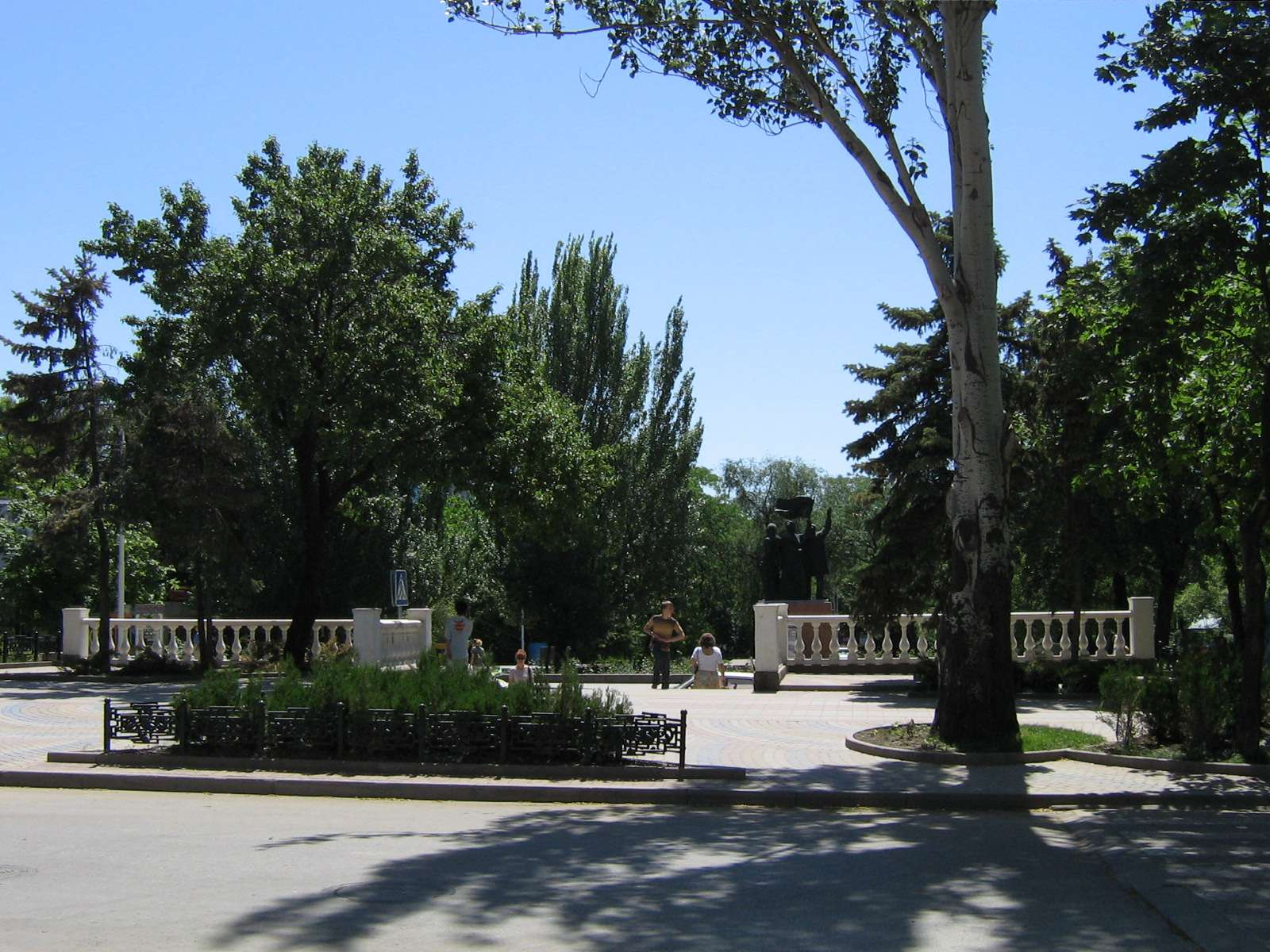
- View of the monument from Gorky Park
- Interactive map of Monument of the Great October Revolution
- Location: Gorky Park in Rostov-on-Don, Russia
- Coordinates: 47°13′25″N 39°42′33″E
- Designer: V. Dubovik
- Type: Monument
- Material: Bronze, granite
- Opening date: 1979

Monument of the Great October Revolution (Russian: Памятник Великой Октябрьской революции) is a bronze monument dedicated to the October Revolution and establishment of the Soviet rule in Rostov-on-Don. Sculptor V. Dubovik and architect E. Polyanskiy created design of the sculptures of three men: a soldier, a seaman and a peasant. The peasant keeps the flag flying. The seaman take purchase on a rifle. The sculptures stands on the red granitical 4.5-metre pedestal. By design, general appearance of the monument symbolize steadfastness of the triumph of the Revolution. The sculpture composition was opened in 1979. It is located at the spot where a rally for establishment of the Soviet rule in the city took place on October 26, 1917. The front of the base carries a bronze plaque reminding about this event:

Crowded rally for support of the triumph of the Socialist Revolution in Petrograd and establishment of the Soviet rule in Rostov-on-Don took place here on October 26, 1917.

== Historical background ==
After the triumph of the February Revolution the broad Bolshevik's political activities began in the Don region. Nashe znamya "Our standard" newspaper explained bolshevik policies and its objectives, strengthened, expanded party organizations, prepared toiling masses to a communist revolution. Rostov-Nakhichevan committee of the Bolsheviks contacted other Don bolshevik groups, helped to constitute new groups, strengthen current party organisations and strengthen political work to earn the trust of the masses through the newspaper.

The number of armed groups of workers has increased every day. Workers with the support of peasants and revolutionary soldiers were ready to advocate overthrow of the Russian Provisional Government. After obtain information about triumph of the communist revolution in Petrograd and proclamation the Soviet power of workers and peasants Rostov-Nakhichevan committee organized a council of Workers' and Soldiers' Deputies on October 26, 1917. The council decided to take full power and constitute a Military-Revolutionary Committee led by Sergey Syrtsov contrary to violent resistance from the Mensheviks and the Socialist Revolutionary Party. After the session the rally of workers and the soldier took place in a city garden near a rotunda. Numerous participants supported the revolution and agreed to provide the needed approval to the council and the Military-Revolutionary Committee. The monument had been built to commemorate this huge milestone.
