= Górki Małe =

Górki Małe may refer to several villages in Poland:

- Górki Małe, Lubusz Voivodeship (west Poland)
- Górki Małe, Silesian Voivodeship (south Poland)
- Górki Małe, Łódź Voivodeship (central Poland)
