= Horki district =

District of Mogilev region, Belarus

Horki district Горацкі раён (Belarusian)
- District
- Flag Coat of arms

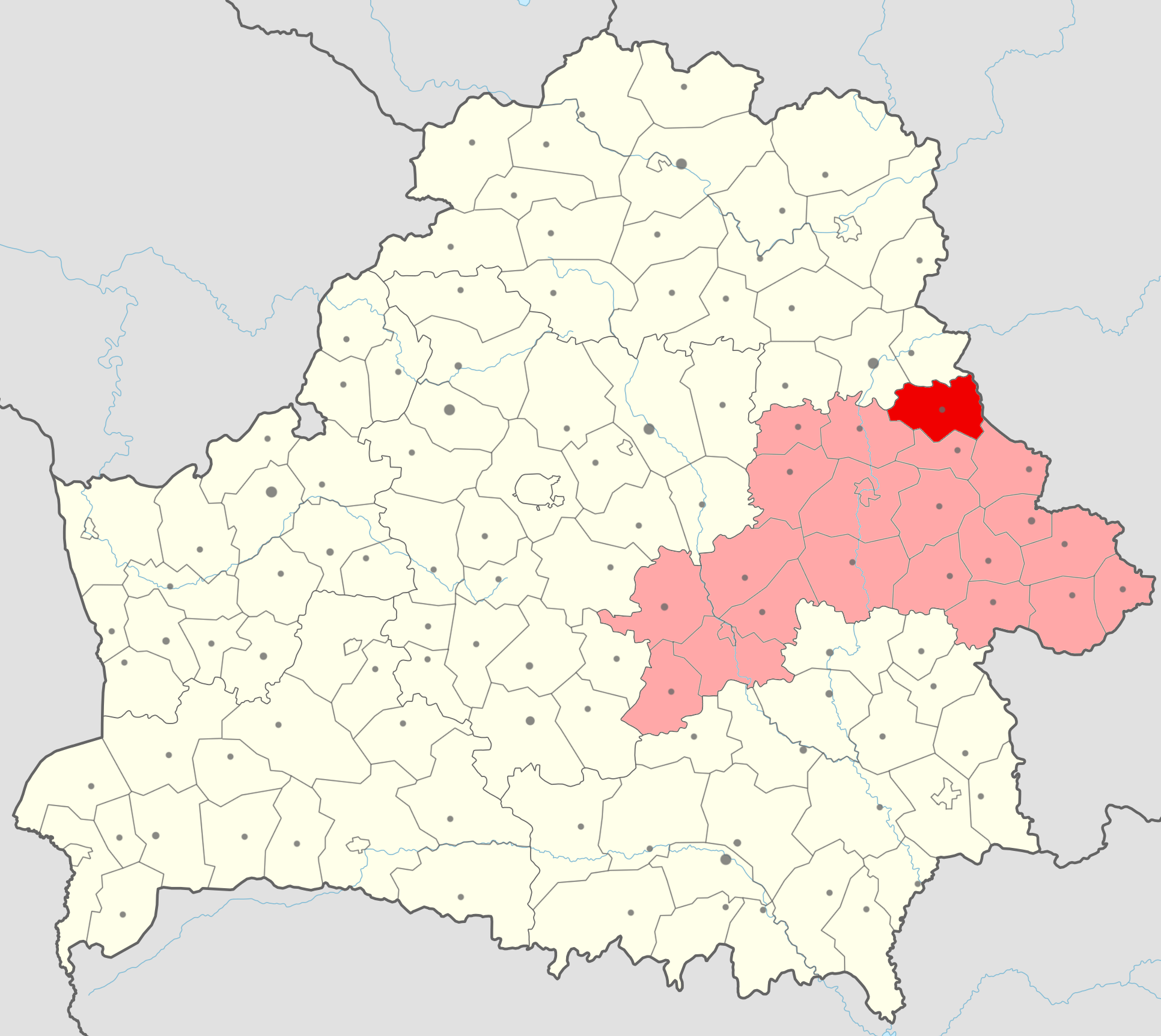
- Coordinates: 54°17′N 30°59′E
- Country: Belarus
- Region: Mogilev region
- Administrative center: Horki

Area
  - Total: 1,284.31 km^{2} (495.87 sq mi)
- Elevation: 221 m (725 ft)

Population (2023)
  - Total: 38,180
  - Density: 29.73/km^{2} (77.00/sq mi)
- Time zone: UTC+3 (MSK)

Horki district (Belarusian: Горацкі раён; Russian: Горецкий район, romanized: Goretsky rayon) is a district (raion) of Mogilev region in Belarus. The administrative center is the town of Horki. As of 2009, its population was 47,800. The population of Horki accounts for 68.6% of the district's population.

== Description ==
The district is situated in the north-east part of the region. It was formed on 17 July 1924. It occupies 1284 km^{2}, and its population is about 46,000. The district is divided into 11 rural stations. On its territory are situated 172 rural populated villages. The district contains the Belarusian State Agricultural Academy and a pedagogical college founded in 1840. These conditions make Horki the center of agricultural science and research. The industry of the district consists of food enterprises, building materials enterprises, light industry enterprises. Agriculture of the district has several main branches: milk and meat cattle-breeding; grain and fodder crops growing; potato growing. Through the territory of Horki district railway Vorša-Kryčaŭ runs. Roads connect Horki with Vorša, Mahiloŭ, Mścisłaŭ and Drybin. Every year 290 thousand of passengers use local railway station and 5.5 million passengers use Horki bus station. The most famous museum of the district is the Memorial complex of “Soviet-Polish friendship” in Ramanava (Lenina) village. On the territory of Horki district the Pronia, Basia, Ramiastvianka, Lebiedzieŭka, Dniaprec, Miareja run. The useful minerals are peat, sands, and clays.
