= Horki =

Horki Горкі (Belarusian) Горки (Russian)
- Town
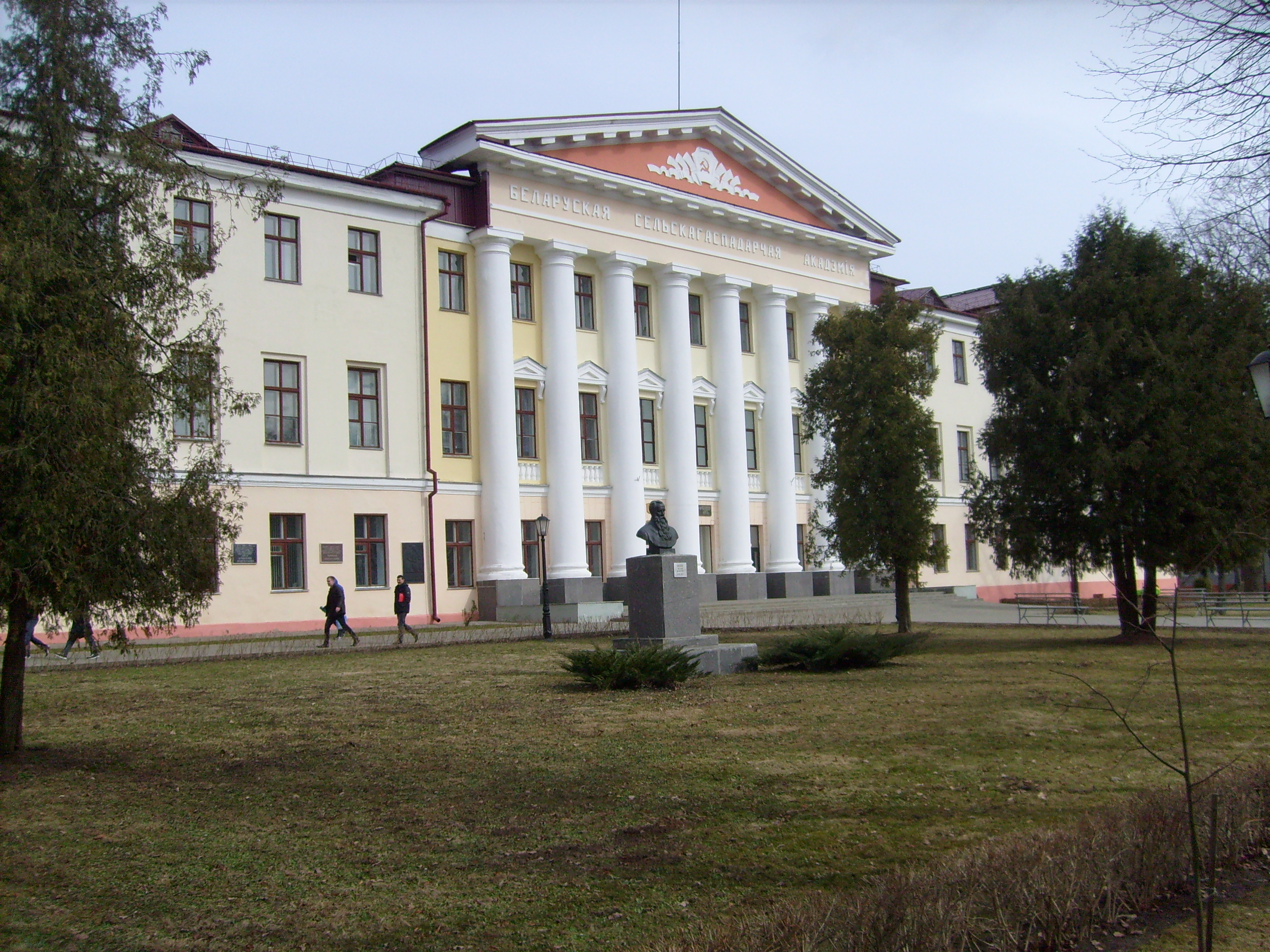
- Belarusian Agriculture Academy

- Flag Coat of arms

- Location within Belarus
- Coordinates: 54°16′N 30°59′E
- Country: Belarus
- Region: Mogilev Region
- District: Horki District
- First mentioned: 1544

Area
  - Total: 22.1 km^{2} (8.5 sq mi)
- Elevation: 191 m (627 ft)

Population (2025)
  - Total: 28,626
  - Density: 1,300/km^{2} (3,350/sq mi)
- Time zone: UTC+3 (MSK)
- Postal code: 213410
- Area code: +375 2233
- License plate: 6
- Website: Official website (in Russian)

Horki or Gorki (Belarusian: Горкі, IPA: [ˈɣorkʲi]; Russian: Горки) is a town in Mogilev Region, Belarus. It serves as the administrative center of Horki District. In 2009, its population was 32,777. In 2024, it had a population of 28,961. As of 2025, it has a population of 28,626.

== History ==
For the first time Horki was mentioned in written sources ("The Lithuanian Chronicles") in 1544 as a village. First known owner was prince Drucki-Horski. Since 1584 Horki was owned by the Sapieha family. Kazimierz Leon Sapieha founded a new Catholic church in Horki, fulfilling the will of his father Lew Sapieha. In the 17th century the village became the center for Hory-Horki estate. Until the 19th century it was called Hory. Three markets plus annual fairs were held in Horki. In 1683 there were 510 houses and 2 service land holdings: “Kazimirovskaya Slaboda” and “Zarechye.” Administratively it was located in the Orsza County in Vitebsk Voivodeship in the Grand Duchy of Lithuania in the Polish–Lithuanian Commonwealth. During the Great Northern War Tsar Peter I of Russia stayed in Horki from July 9 to August 16, 1708.

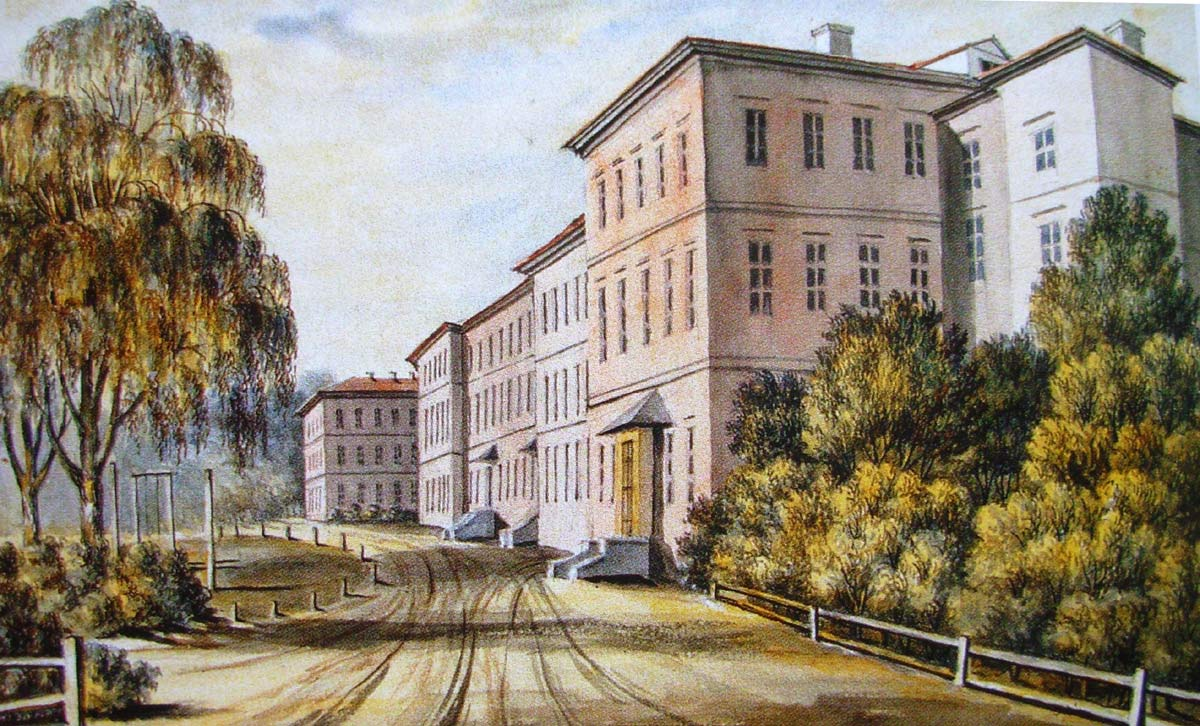
Horki Agricultural Institute in the 19th century

Horki was annexed by the Russian Empire in 1772 in the course of the First Partition of Poland. Decree of the Ruling Senate on October 23, 1772, Mogilev Province was divided into four provinces - Mogilev, Mstislav, Rogachev and Orsha. Horki and surrounding areas were included in the Orsha province, and from 1777 - in Orsha district, and then Kopyssky district.

In 1840 the Horki Agricultural School was opened, and in 1848 it was transformed into the Horki Agricultural Institute. From this time Horki became the center of agricultural education in the territory of present-day Belarus. Opening of agricultural institutions contributed to the economic development of the Horki. Thus, in 1859 began working iron foundry, opened a post office (1840), pharmacy (1840), the meteorological station (1841).

On December 26, 1861, Tsarist government ordered to change status of village to status of town.

During the January Uprising, on May 6, 1863, it was the site of a battle between Polish insurgents and Russian troops, won by the Poles. In 1864, the Agricultural Institute was moved to Saint Petersburg, leaving only the agricultural and taxation schools in Horki.

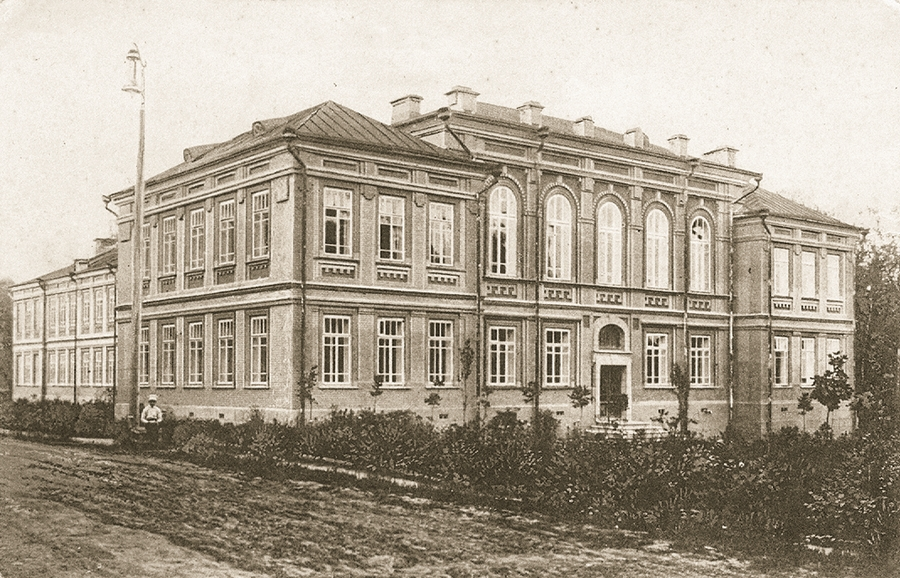
Horki in the early 20th century

State peasants, who lived in Horki, had the right to remain in the same class or go to the category of lower middle class. At the same time they would depart their land to the Ministry of State Property. For the conduct of municipal services and judicial affairs was created Horki City Council. The following year, in the Horki from Kopyss were transferred the court, district treasury, post office, city hospital, military command and other institutions. In August 1867 had approved the provision of arms of the city Horki: "... to portray in this coat of arms, as the main emblem of the city Horki, three hills, the middle higher than others, and to indicate the occupation of farming population of the city – wheat plants growing out of the tips of the hills, in the top part of the coat of arms to put Mogilev province coat of arms and decorate the tower with three prongs."

At the 1926 Soviet census, there were 2,343 Jews living in Horki, making up 27.8% of the total population. By 1939, the Jewish population had dropped to 2,031, or 16.3% of the population.

During World War II, Horki was under German military occupation from 12 July 1941 until 26 June 1944. Prior to its occupation, the town suffered heavy bombing as a result of an air raid on 26 June. An Einsatzkommando detachment massacred the Jewish population on 7 October 1941. The Soviet Extraordinary State Commission estimated the total number of Jewish victims to be 300.

Current emblem and flag of the city approved by Presidential Decree 24 August 2006 No. 526 "On establishing the official heraldic symbols of administrative and territorial units of Mogilev region."

== Climate ==
Climate data for Horki (1991–2020, extremes 1841–present)
Month	Jan	Feb	Mar	Apr	May	Jun	Jul	Aug	Sep	Oct	Nov	Dec	Year
Record high °C (°F)	9.0 (48.2)	11.1 (52.0)	22.6 (72.7)	27.6 (81.7)	30.9 (87.6)	34.5 (94.1)	35.3 (95.5)	38.7 (101.7)	29.9 (85.8)	24.5 (76.1)	13.8 (56.8)	10.1 (50.2)	38.7 (101.7)
Mean daily maximum °C (°F)	−3.1 (26.4)	−2.4 (27.7)	3.1 (37.6)	12.2 (54.0)	18.5 (65.3)	22.0 (71.6)	24.1 (75.4)	23.1 (73.6)	17.1 (62.8)	9.6 (49.3)	2.3 (36.1)	−1.8 (28.8)	10.4 (50.7)
Daily mean °C (°F)	−5.5 (22.1)	−5.3 (22.5)	−0.8 (30.6)	6.8 (44.2)	12.8 (55.0)	16.5 (61.7)	18.5 (65.3)	17.2 (63.0)	11.8 (53.2)	5.8 (42.4)	0.2 (32.4)	−3.8 (25.2)	6.2 (43.1)
Mean daily minimum °C (°F)	−8.1 (17.4)	−8.2 (17.2)	−4.5 (23.9)	2.0 (35.6)	7.2 (45.0)	10.9 (51.6)	13.2 (55.8)	12.0 (53.6)	7.2 (45.0)	2.5 (36.5)	−1.8 (28.8)	−5.9 (21.4)	2.2 (36.0)
Record low °C (°F)	−39.5 (−39.1)	−36.7 (−34.1)	−33.2 (−27.8)	−17.7 (0.1)	−4.4 (24.1)	−2.1 (28.2)	3.5 (38.3)	0.7 (33.3)	−6.9 (19.6)	−13.8 (7.2)	−24.4 (−11.9)	−34.1 (−29.4)	−39.5 (−39.1)
Average precipitation mm (inches)	36.5 (1.44)	32.8 (1.29)	36.5 (1.44)	36.2 (1.43)	62.6 (2.46)	71.0 (2.80)	83.7 (3.30)	72.8 (2.87)	51.4 (2.02)	60.5 (2.38)	46.3 (1.82)	38.0 (1.50)	628.3 (24.75)
Average precipitation days (≥ 1.0 mm)	9.5	8.7	8.6	6.9	9.2	9.5	10.4	9.1	8.1	9.4	9.9	10.6	109.9
Mean monthly sunshine hours	43.0	71.9	143.1	199.9	261.4	283.9	288.5	256.0	170.9	97.5	36.4	28.1	1,880.6
Source 1: Pogoda.ru.net
Source 2: NOAA

== Notable residents ==
- Raphael Kalinowski (1835–1907), Polish Discalced Carmelite friar, insurgent, teacher, engineer, Catholic saint, student of the Horki Agricultural Institute
- Lev Razgon (1908–1999), journalist and writer, prisoner of the Gulag and a human rights activist
- Sergei Tikhanovsky (born 1978), dissident and pro-democracy activist who is considered by Amnesty International to be a political prisoner and a prisoner of conscience
- Lavrenty Abetsedarsky (1916–1975). Belarusian Soviet historian and educator. He founded and led the scientific school studying the pre-Soviet period of Belarusian history. He studied Belarusian-Russian socioeconomic, cultural, and political relations in the second half of the 16th and 17th centuries.
- Alexander Kilchevsky (born 1955). Belarusian scientist in the field of plant genetics, breeding, and biotechnology. He developed a method for assessing the adaptive capacity and ecological stability of genotypes and the environment as a background for selection.
- Alexander Tsyganov (born 1953). Belarusian agrochemist, agroecologist, and historian of higher agricultural education. Under his leadership, agrochemical methods for producing environmentally friendly plant products were developed and implemented. He has published over 800 scientific and methodological works.
- Igor Tsytovich (1917–1985). Belarusian scientist in the field of mechanical engineering. He participated in the creation of the first Belarusian automobile, the MAZ-525, and in the improvement of the GAZ-53, KrAZ-214, and BelAZ-540 vehicles, as well as tractors. He also worked on the design of key vehicle and tractor components.
- Valentina Gorunovich (born 1952). Belarusian architect. She designed architectural components for construction, reconstruction, and major renovation projects for residential, civil, and agricultural buildings. Co-author of numerous textbooks.
- Layzer Naimark (1912–1994). Belarusian scientist in the field of plant growing. He authored several dozen scientific papers on the cultivation of leguminous crops. He worked as a professor in the Department of Plant Growing at the Belarusian Agricultural Academy.
- Ivan Kupchinov (1909–1988). Belarusian scientist in the field of geodesy. Author of over 70 scientific papers and textbooks on engineering geodesy, balancing geodetic networks, and programming equalization calculations on computers.
- Alexander Artishevsky (born 1933). Belarusian histologist and embryologist. Author of over 200 scientific papers, including monographs. Author of scientific papers on embryology and the development of the endocrine system in normal and stressful situations. Writes poetry. In 2019, a book of poems, "Tarnova," was published.
- Vladimir Isayenko (1928–2010). Belarusian archaeologist. Discovered over 300 Stone and Bronze Age sites in Polesia. Explored 14 sites. Author of over 400 articles for encyclopedias. Laid the theoretical and practical foundations of Belarusian military archeology.
- Maria Chaika (1929–1997). Belarusian scientist in the field of plant physiology and biochemistry. Author of over 100 scientific papers, including three monographs and three inventions. His research focuses on chlorophyll biosynthesis and the biogenesis of pigment-protein complexes in plant plastid membranes.
- Vladimir Pushkin (born 1936). Belarusian architect. Major works: a series of 90 large-panel residential buildings and a block section for Brest, Grodno, and other cities of the Byelorussian SSR, a catalog of standardized standard designs and basic nomenclature, and a complex of buildings for design institutes.
- Sergey Kosyanenko (born 1956). Belarusian scientist, Doctor of Agricultural Sciences. Author of approximately 140 papers on the selection, reproduction, and technology of duck breeding, as well as 10 scientific and practical recommendations. He is engaged in the development of methods and techniques for poultry breeding.
- Irina Garkusha (1946 – 2013). Belarusian theater and film actress. She played dozens of roles in the theater. While still a student, she starred in the film "Sasha-Sashenka." She worked as an assistant director at the Belarusfilm studio and appeared in several films.
- Margarita Savitskaya (born 1928). Belarusian painter. Works in genre scenes, landscapes, and portraits. Author of the paintings "In the Field," "Summer," "Gymnasts," "Bread for the Partisans," and others. He also painted a portrait of People's Artist M. Savitsky.
- Vasily Lubyako (1891 – 1950). Belarusian scientist and economist. Author of over 50 scientific papers on the organization and planning of agricultural production and the development of Belarus's raw materials and energy resources. He was involved in the post-war reconstruction of the Belarusian economy.
- Vladimir Timoshenko (born 1956). Belarusian scientist and zootechnician. Research papers on improving existing and developing new technologies for intensive livestock production. Inessa Boytsova (born 1935). Belarusian architect. Major works: administrative building in the urban settlement of Krasnoye, Molodechno District; interiors of the railway post office near the Kazansky Station in Moscow; a hotel-type dormitory in Soligorsk; small architectural forms.
- Vladimir Kumachev (born 1941). Belarusian scientist in the field of land reclamation. Author of 15 inventions, 177 scientific and educational works in Russian and English, including 7 monographs, textbooks, and recommendations. Work on automatic soil moisture control.
- Vladimir Aderikho (1937–2006) was a geobotanist and author of scientific papers on biocenology, restoration, conservation, and sustainable forest use. He is the author and co-author of over 125 scientific papers, including five monographs and ten vegetation maps.
- Alexey Daineko (born 1968) was a Belarusian economist and academician of the National Academy of Sciences of Belarus. He is the author of approximately 200 scientific papers, including 28 monographs, books, and teaching aids. He developed the scientific foundations of Belarus's foreign trade relations, including their development strategy and models.
- Afanasy Kudryavitsky (born 1906) was a Belarusian architect. His major works include master plans for Mozyr, Kalinkovichi, and Baranovichi, development and development plans for the microdistricts along Orlovskaya and Kalvariyskaya Streets in Minsk, and a standard design for the building of the Communist Party of Belarus Committee of the Republic of Belarus. He is the author of several books.

== Sources ==
- Megargee, Geoffrey P.; Dean, Martin (2012). The United States Holocaust Memorial Museum Encyclopedia of Camps and Ghettos 1933–1945. Volume II. Indiana University Press, United States Holocaust Memorial Museum. pp. 1675–1676. ISBN 978-0-253-35599-7.
