= Zantyr =

Ruined castle in Poland

- Zantirburg, Burg Zanthir
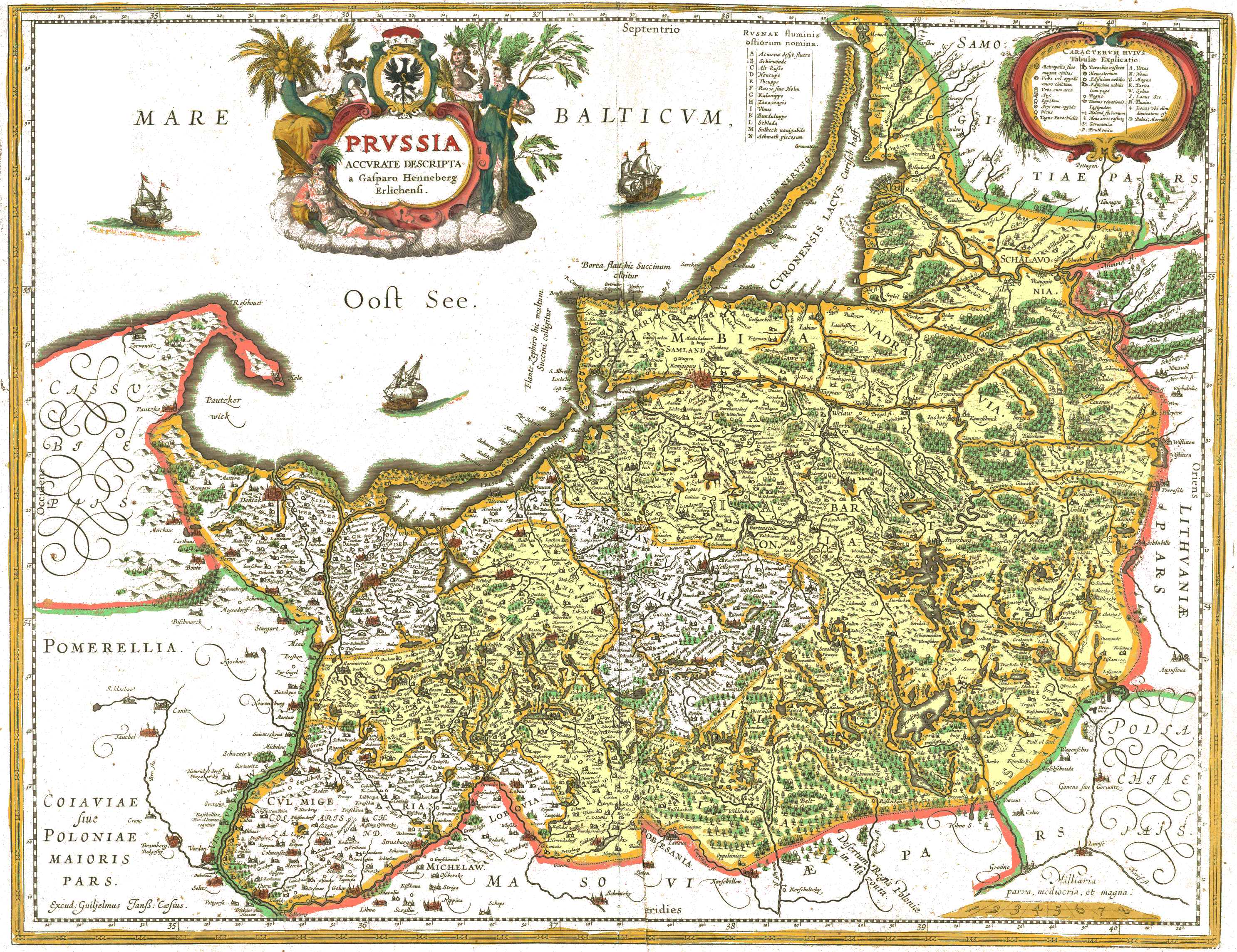
- The town of Zantyr is visible on this map of Caspar Hennenberger from 1576

- Location of the Zantyr Castle in Poland Zantyr (Pomeranian Voivodeship)
- 53°56′37″N 18°54′36″E

History
- Built: 1240
- Built by: State of the Teutonic Order
- Abandoned: c. 1281-1282

Site notes
- Condition: lost

Zantyr (Polish: Santyr, Zantir, German: Zantirburg, Burg Zanthir.) is a lost Teutonic Order castle with established commandry and town with cathedral, seat of the bishopric. In the early 13th century it was located at present day Pomeranian Voivodeship, in Sztum County, in the municipality of Sztum, south of the village Uśnice or in the region Biała Góra at the confluence of the rivers Nogat and Vistula. Here, at the southern end of the Vistula delta region (Żuław Wiślanych), resides the Nogat River Protected Landscape Area. During its brief history Zantyr was contested between Swietopelk II, Duke of Pomerania, State of the Teutonic Order and Bishopric of Pomesania. At the end around year 1280 the castle and town were reestablished at a new location and became known as Malbork Castle.

== Location ==
The location of the Zantyr castle has not been determined and no archaeological artifacts has been found. It is believed that the first castle was built near the "old Prussian settlement Santyr", likely at location of former hillfort. Till present day there are two inhabited places: a village Piekło located on island or peninsula (depending on water level) at two rivers confluence and another one Biała Góra on the high river bank. In 13th century contested property was also referred as "island of Zanthir" (German: Insel Zanthir). Finding exact location if successful will make Zantyr a Pomeranian Troy. "The association between Zantyr and Biała Gora, as well as its relocation, was maintained by local inhabitants into the eighteenth century, and remains the most likely location for the early commandery centre." The Zantirburg (German: Burg Zanthir) is depicted on the maps of Caspar Hennenberger from 1576 and of Samuel Suchodolec from 1700 to 1713.

== History ==
Missionary bishop Christian of Oliva founded the first Cistercian monastery in Prussia near the fork of the Vistula and Nogat, on the right river bank, the area known as Zantar. This area not far from Sztum was received by Christian of Oliva from Mestwin I, Duke of Pomerania. From 1215 Zantyr was the seat of the first bishop of Prussia, there was also the first episcopal chapter and a cathedral.

The first documented mentions of Zantyr (Zantir) appear in the year 1240 in the document of Pope Gregory IX, with a complaint from the missionary bishop Christian of Oliva on the actions of the Teutonic Knights, who destroyed or repossessed the episcopal church, castle and town Sanctir along with others. Prior to these events lands of Prussian Pomezani has been partially conquered and controlled by Pomeranian prince Swietopelk II, Duke of Pomerania. In course of conquest Swietopelk II established Zantyr castle together with the borough on the right, high bank of Nogat river.

In December 1251 Sambor II, Duke of Pomerania gave Zantyr to the Teutonic Order for Order help in the construction of the castle Tczew and village Gorzędziej. Another version of this story informs about the sale of the castle Zantyr to the Teutonic Knights by Swietopelk II, Duke of Pomerania. In 1266, after the death of Swietopelk II, Mestwin II, Duke of Pomerania, demanded the return of Zantyr, calling the Teutonic Knights beggars who claimed the right to the city. In 1275 Pope Gregory X confirmed that the Teutonic Knights possessed the island of Zantyr. In 1279, the castle at Zantyr was relocated down the Nogat to the site of Malbork, which became the centre of the new commandery of Marienburg.

In 1274–1280 the Teutonic Knights began to build, partly from materials obtained from the demolition of the old monastery buildings of Cistercian Order in Zantyr, Malbork Castle in the lower reaches of Nogat, which they called Marienburg (today's Malbork).

In 1399 the church in Zantyr was ordained. During the Thirteen Years’ War (1454–1466), there were fights for the church in Zantyr.

== See also ==
- Malbork Castle
