= The Baltic Flood of 1888 =

Rain event in Prussia

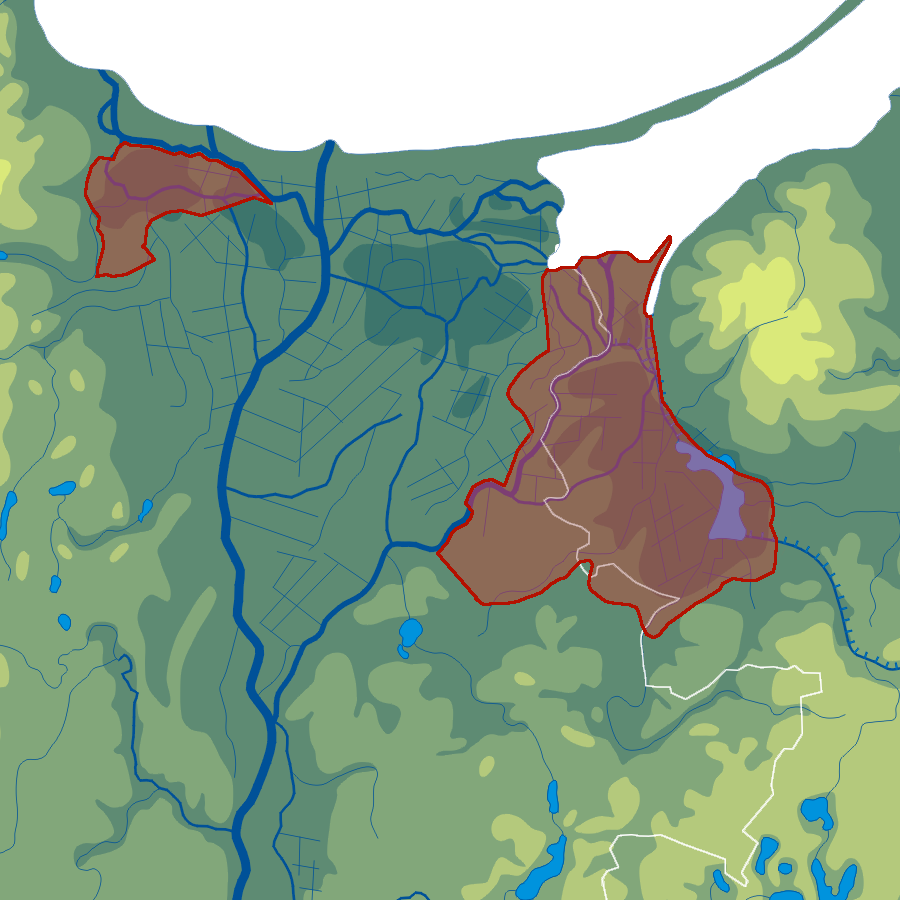
- Areas flooded during The Baltic Flood Of 1888

Meteorological history
- as The Baltic Flood of 1888
- Duration: 25 March - 1 April (1 week, 1 day)

Overall effects
- Fatalities: Unknown
- Injuries: Unknown
- Damage: 30 million Deutsch Marks
- Areas affected: German Empire Westpreußen Ostpreußen

The Baltic Flood of 1888 was a flood event that affected a large part of the Elbing, Marienburg and Stuhm counties in Poland. As a result, almost all of Sumpfland Weichsel and part of Danziger Werder were flooded.

== Historical vulnerability of the Vistula Delta ==
The Vistula Delta has historically been one of the most flood-prone regions in Europe. Its low-lying geography, coupled with the confluence of major rivers such as the Vistula and Nogat, makes the area susceptible to flooding during periods of snowmelt or heavy rainfall.

In the decades preceding the 1888 flood, local communities had already experienced smaller-scale floods, but none approached the magnitude of this event. The winter of 1887–1888, marked by record snowfall across Ostpreußen, set the stage for the catastrophe, while the region's growing dependence on agriculture and trade heightened the economic risks of flooding.

=== The winter of 1887-88 ===
The winter of 1887/1888 was exceptionally snowy. Additionally, from March 10 to 18, there were heavy snowfalls. The ice cover on the Vistula reached 40 cm (16 in), and 80 cm (31 in) on the Nogat. On 22 March, a huge ice jam formed on the Vistula at Pieckel and Weißenberg, which caused the water to rise and huge masses of water flowed into the Nogat.

== Causes ==
Extreme weather conditions
The rapid transition from a harsh winter to sudden spring warmth caused a rapid snowmelt, releasing an unprecedented volume of water into the rivers. This was compounded by several days of heavy rainfall in late March, which intensified the runoff. The 1,047-kilometre (651 mi) long Vistula River was already vulnerable to flooding during times of high discharge. The Nogat River, a branch of the Vistula, amplified the problem at Weißenberg, where the water overflowed into the delta's intricate canal systems, flooding vast tracts of land.

Insufficient flood defenses
While some dikes and embankments existed along the rivers, they were poorly constructed and not designed to handle such a massive volume of water. Maintenance was inconsistent, leaving many stretches of the dikes vulnerable to breaches.

== Timeline of the flood ==
From 22 to 24 March, Heavy rains fell across East Prussia, saturating the region's frozen landscape. At the same time, temperatures rose sharply, triggering a rapid thaw of snow and ice. On 25 March, The flood began in earnest as the Vistula and Nogat rivers overflowed their banks. Dikes near Weißenberg and Marienburg failed, sending torrents of water into surrounding areas. By nightfall, floodwaters had reached major towns, forcing residents to flee. By 26-28 March, flooding had reached its peak. Roads, bridges, and railways were destroyed, isolating communities such as Sommerau and Körlin for days. Relief efforts were hampered by the scale of destruction and lack of access. By late March, Waters began to recede, leaving behind a landscape of destruction. Recovery efforts were slow and hampered by logistical challenges.

== Extent of flooding ==
The floodwaters covered thousands of square kilometers, submerging towns, villages, and farmland. The hardest-hit areas included Marienburg, Stuhm, Weißenberg, Sommerau and Körlin.

=== Malbork (Marienburg) ===
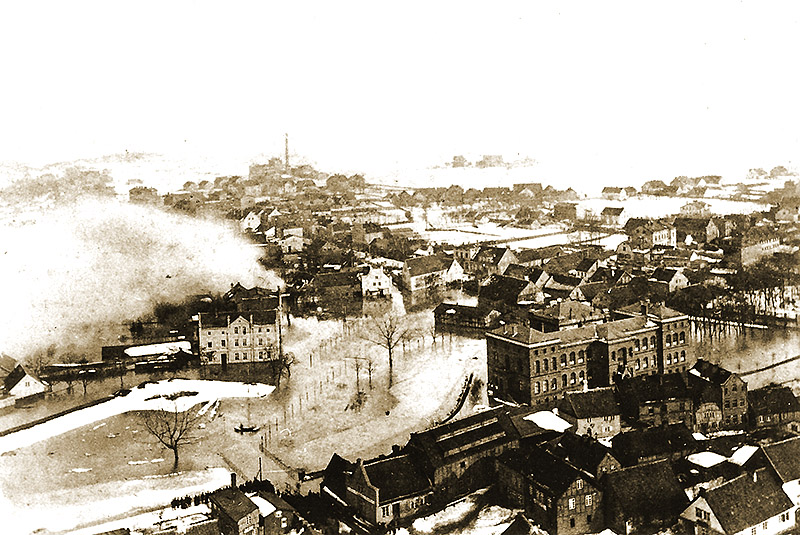
Flooded streets of Marienburg, 25 March 1888

The historic town of Marienburg, home to the medieval Malbork Castle, suffered the most damage. Floodwaters from the Nogat River breached nearby embankments, inundating residential areas, farmland, and parts of the castle grounds. The lower levels of the castle, including storerooms and sections of its defensive structures, were damaged by water intrusion. Many wooden bridges and smaller structures were swept away.

The town's economy, reliant on trade via the Nogat and Vistula rivers, ground to a halt as transportation routes were submerged. Local warehouses, grain silos, and mills were destroyed, leading to food shortages and driving up prices, the damage in Marienburg alone, was estimated to be at least 30 million Deutsche Marks

=== Ząbrowo (Sommerau) ===
Flooded houses in Sommerau, 25 March 1888

Sommerau, a small but important rural settlement, suffered immense damage due to its proximity to the overflowing Nogat River. The majority of Sommerau's residents were farmers, and the flood destroyed nearly all farmland in the area. Orchards, wheat fields, and vegetable crops were submerged, with many never recovering fully for years. Barns and farmhouses were swept away, resulting in the loss of livestock that was crucial to the local economy. This left many families destitute and reliant on government aid.

=== Karlino (Körlin) ===
Three men sailing on a boat in the flooded city of Körlin, 31 March 1888

Körlin, situated along the Persante River, experienced its worst flood in over 30 years. The Persante's narrow riverbanks overflowed, submerging much of Karlino's residential and commercial areas. The town's central square and adjacent streets were under several feet of water. Körlin's watermills, vital for local industries, were destroyed or heavily damaged, crippling the town's economy. Hundreds of residents were displaced, seeking refuge in nearby higher ground. Unsanitary conditions in temporary shelters led to outbreaks of cholera and typhoid, exacerbating the humanitarian crisis. As a small but industrious town, Körlin's economy relied heavily on trade and agriculture, both of which were severely disrupted by the flood.

=== Sztum (Stuhm) ===
Stuhm, a predominantly rural area, was heavily affected by the flood's impact on agriculture. The entire farmlands were submerged, with crops destroyed and soil rendered infertile by silt and debris. Livestock losses were extensive, with thousands of animals swept away or drowned. Many smallholders, reliant on the spring planting season, faced complete financial ruin. Thousands of hectares of arable land were inundated, with crops destroyed and soil fertility compromised by silt and sand deposits. Livestock losses were catastrophic, with entire herds swept away by floodwaters.

The flood severed Stuhm's road and rail connections, leaving residents stranded for days. food and medical supplies were scarce, and many residents relied on community relief efforts. Unlike other cities, Stuhm being situated on slightly higher ground, escaped the worst of the flooding, but surrounding roads and bridges were destroyed, cutting off access to relief supplies for weeks, Recovery in Stuhm was slow, as the rural economy struggled to rebuild in the flood's aftermath.

=== Biała Góra (Weißenberg) ===
At the confluence of the Weichsel and Nogat rivers, Weißenberg was particularly vulnerable to the flood. Both rivers surged, overwhelming the town's defenses and inundating homes, farms, and infrastructure. Residents were forced to flee to higher ground, often abandoning their possessions to the rising waters. Damage to the town's waterways and embankments exposed the need for improved flood control measures.

== Human and economic cost ==
The exact death rate is practically unknown, though the true number may have been really high due to unrecorded casualties in rural areas. Most fatalities occurred during the initial dike breaches and from hypothermia in the following days. Thousands were displaced, with many forced to live in makeshift shelters for weeks or months.

The total damage was estimated at 70 million Deutsch Marks, at the time. Agriculture was the hardest-hit sector, with destroyed farmland, lost livestock, and ruined crops plunging many communities into economic hardship.

== Response and legacy ==
In the wake of the disaster, local and regional authorities undertook extensive efforts to rebuild and improve flood management. Reforms included the construction of new dikes, improvements to drainage systems, and better maintenance of waterways. However, the recovery process was slow, and many affected towns, including Körlin and Sommerau, took years to fully rebuild.

Today, the Great Flood of 1888 is remembered as a defining event in the region's history, underscoring the vulnerability of low-lying areas and the need for effective disaster management.
