= Beswan =

Beswan Kila Beswan Vishwamitrapuri
- Town
- Location in Uttar Pradesh, India Beswan (India)
- Coordinates: 27.65°N 77.88°E
- Country: India
- State: Uttar Pradesh
- District: Aligarh
- Tehsil: Iglas

Population (2011)
  - Total: 6,278
- Time zone: UTC+5:30 (IST)
- Vehicle registration: up81
- Vidhan Sabha constituency: iglas
- Lok Sabha constituency: Hathras
- Website: up.gov.in

Beswan (also known as Vishwamitra Puri) is a town and a nagar panchayat in Aligarh district in the state of Uttar Pradesh, India. Beswan was a jagir which was ruled by Thenua Jats.

== History ==
The Rajas of Beswan were Thenua Jats. Beswan jagir owes its origin to Nawal Singh, eldest brother of Daya Ram, who, when worsted in the contest with his energetic younger brother, retired to Beswan, which with 26 other villages had been set apart for his maintenance during the life of Raja Bhuri Singh, his father. Nawal Singh does not appear to have ever taken any measures to press his claims to the gaddi of Hathras by right of seniority. He was succeeded by his two sons, Jíwa Ram and Harikishan. The former received Beswan and the estate connected with it, partly in jagir and partly on a fixed revenue for life, and the latter shared with him.

Harikishen Singh joined his Thenua clansmesn Raja Bhagwant Singh of Mursan and Raja Dayaram of Hathras in opposing the British. Harikishen fought Britishers at Kachaura, Bijaigarh and Sasni. It was at the Siege of Bijaigarh that one of the sons of Harikishen Singh died. Harikishen was succeeded by his son Jaikishan or Jaikishor, who, on the downfall of Hathras, obtained the grant of taluka Shahzádpur, formed partly from Hathras and partly from Mendu.

Jaikishan was succeeded by Giri Parshad. He was a very learned and holy personality of his time. He translated and published all the vedas from sanskrit language to German Language in 1870 and for that noble cause he was awarded the prize in 1872 by the then German Government.

== Geography ==
Beswan is located at 27.65°N 77.88°E. It has an average elevation of 176 metres (577 feet).

== Demographics ==
As of 2021 India census, Beswan had a population of 9,120. Males constitute 58% of the population and females 42%. Beswan has an average literacy rate of 87%, higher than the national average of 59.5%; with 65% of the males and 35% of females literate. 20% of the population is under 6 years of age.

== Tourist places ==
- Dharnidhar Pond is famous place of Beswan where Vishwamitra did worship.
1. Maa Putha Vali, Barhdwari Prabhu Bhole nath ji & Ram Mandir is also famous in small town.

@ This is second position town in Uttar Pradesh (State).

- Many fairs are also organised at various times of festivals

== Education ==
- Mangalayatan University

== Nearby cities ==
Aligarh, Iglas, Mathura, Hathras, Raya

== Nearby villages and towns ==
Kalinjari, Gorai, Amarpur dhana, Shyam Garhi, mokampur, bona, Sudama ka bas, Jahroli, Garhi pithair, (Sathini)
