= Gorai (disambiguation) =

Gorai is a village at Dharavi Bhet, in Mumbai, India.

Gorai may also refer to:

- Gorai, Uttar Pradesh
- Gorai Creek
- Gorai (surname)

== See also ==
- Goray
- Horai
- Horay
- Goraj (disambiguation)
