= Dahora, Iglas, Aligarh, Uttar Pradesh =

Coordinates: 27°50′35.1″N 77°48′12.7″E

Dahora is a village in the Iglas tehsil (administrative district), in the Aligarh District of Uttar Pradesh, India, situated 39 km from Aligarh. It lies along the Khair–Taintigaon Road and has a population of roughly 1,200. Dahora is part of the Nagla Jotu Gram Panchayat. As of 2025, Vinod kumar served as Pradhan.

The village is a rich source of water, with two nearby west–east and west–south canals.

The climate is hot in summer and cold in winter.

Agriculture is the main source of income in this village. However, youth are now moving towards those cities and towns where they have means of earning.
