= Gadua =

Gadua is a village (Post-Harotha) in Iglas tahsil in Aligarh district in Uttar Pradesh, India. Most of the population in the village are Jaats (Thenua) but there are also other castes. The people of the village played a great role in Indian Independence. The main source of income of the people is from agriculture. There are many crops cultivated such as-wheat, rice, potato, apiculture, various dals, etc.
