= Jamanka =

Village in Aligarh, India

- Village
- Location in Uttar Pradesh, India
- Coordinates: 28°01′N 77°49′E
- Country: India
- State: Uttar Pradesh
- District: Aligarh
- Tehsil: Gabhana

Population (2011)
  - Total: 6,366

Languages
  - Official: Hindi
- Time zone: UTC+5:30 (IST)

Jamanka is a large village located in the Gabhana area of Aligarh district in the Indian state of Uttar Pradesh.

== Demographics ==
The population of Jamanka as recorded at the Indian Census of 2011 is 6,366, in 986 households. The male population was 3,341 to 3,025 females, giving a sex ratio of 905 compared to 912 for Uttar Pradesh state. The number of children of age 0-6 is 1,324, comprising 20.80% of the whole population of the village, and the sex ratio among children is 922 (Uttar Pradesh 902).

The literacy rate of Jamanka village has a literacy rate of 63.35%, which is lower than the state average of 67.68%. The literacy rate among males is 75.98%, among females 49.33%.

== Governance ==
Jamanka village is headed by an elected Sarpanch.
