= Chandaus =

Settlement in India

Coordinates: 28.07998825259221°N 77.84916389602171°E

Chandaus is a small town located in Aligarh district of Uttar Pradesh, India. It is located on the bank of Karban river, 38 kilometres (24 mi) northwest of district headquarter Aligarh. Chandaus is one of the 12 Blocks in Aligarh district.

Chandaus is located on the Deorau-Pisawa main road. The nearest railway station is Danwar (6.5 km). A new industry corridor is taking shape in Chimanpur village which is just 1 kilometre away from Chandaus. These industries will help in generating employment opportunities for people of nearby area.

A Gargaj in Chandaus built by Mughal dynasty to look after situation of draught and famine along with military movement is still standing.

The town comes under a military corridor dedicated by the Government of India and is going to be a hub of aerospace engineering.

The Nagar Panchayat of Chandaus comprises 84 villages surrounding Chandaus.

== Nearby places ==
Nearby towns to Chandaus are Gabhana, Pisawa, Khurja, Khair, Jattari, Tappal, Jewar and Bajna.

== Nearby major cities ==
Khair (19 km), Khurja (20 km), Bulandshahar (39 km), Aligarh (38 km), Greater Noida (62 km), Palwal (65 km), Mathura (80 km). [Pisawa] (10 km) Baharpur (06 km)
