= Ballabh =

Ballabh is a given name. Notable people with the name include:

- Janaki Ballabh Patnaik (1927–2015), an Indian politician who has been Governor of Assam since 2009
- Janki Ballabh Shastri (1916–2011), an Indian Hindi poet, writer and critic

== See also ==
- Chhoti ballabh, village in the Gonda block of Iglas tehsil in Aligarh district, in Uttar Pradesh state in India
- Govind Ballabh Pant Engineering College run by the state government of Uttarakhand, India
- Govind Ballabh Pant Sagar, a lake situated in the southern region of Sonebhadra
- Govind Ballabh Pant Social Science Institute in Allahabad, India
- Govind Ballabh Pant University of Agriculture & Technology, the first agricultural university of India
- Ballaban
- Ballabeg
- Ballabio
- Ballabur
- Vallabhi
