= Parta Nagla =

Coordinates: 27°42′N 77°55′E

- village
- Interactive map of Parta Nagla
- Country: India
- State: Uttar Pradesh
- District: Aligarh

Population
  - Total: Approximately 600

Languages
  - Official: Hindi
- Time zone: UTC+5:30 (IST)
- PIN: 202124
- Telephone code: 05722
- Vehicle registration: UP-81
- Coastline: 0 kilometres (0 mi)
- Nearest city: Aligarh, Khair
- Sex ratio: 100 : 95 ♂/♀
- Literacy: 40%
- Lok Sabha constituency: Aligarh

Parta Nagla is a village in the Aligarh district of Uttar Pradesh in India. It is 3 km away from the town Iglas. This village is well known for its record production of potato. The main occupation of this village is agriculture.

The nearby villages are Bisahuli, Katha, Matroi and Chunni Nagla. There is a famous temple of Chamunda Mata near this village. Devotees from all over India come here for worship.

In terms of infrastructure, condition of this village is not good, there is no electrical power supply.
