= Amarpur Dhana =

- Village
- Location in Uttar Pradesh, India
- Coordinates: 27.72°N 77.93°E
- Country: India
- State: Uttar Pradesh
- District: Aligarh
- Tehsil: iglas
- Block: Gonda
- Gram Panchayat: Amarpur Dahana
- Elevation: 178 m (584 ft)

Population (2011)
  - Total: 1,144

Language
  - Official: Hindi
  - Dialect: Brajbhasha
- Time zone: UTC+5:30 (IST)
- PIN: 202145
- Telephone code: 05722
- Vehicle registration: UP-81
- Vidhan Sabha constituency: iglas
- Lok Sabha constituency: Hathras
- Website: aligarh.nic.in

Amarpur Dhana or Amarpur Dahana is a village in Iglas Tahsil of Aligarh district in the Indian state of Uttar Pradesh.
