= Chhoti ballabh =

Chhoti Ballabh is a village situated in the Gonda block of Iglas tehsil in Aligarh district, Uttar Pradesh, India.

== Location ==
Village Chhoti Ballabh is situated at the western border of Iglas about 7 kilometers away from the town Gonda of the district Aligarh. It is located near Khair -Taintigoan road.

== History ==
There was a high heap of remnants of an unknown fort, where this village Chhoti is situated. There were signs of a trench around this "Teela" in the earlier days of its establishment. Besides this, there is a historical barren land of around 20 Bighas (four acres) in the 300 meters northern side of this village called "Naraina".It has some signs of a disappeared old 'Nagar' because there is an old wall at some depth which goes up to village chhoti. Another significant thing which was noticed in earlier days was that some glittering small stones and a lot of old pattern terracotta pots were also found throughout this baron land which is a sign of an old and historical place.

Village Chhoti-Ballabh is composed of the small villages Chhoti and Ballabh. There is a big pond in between these two villages called Devalay and remnants of the temple are still existing near this pond. There is a place called Mata on the north-eastern side of the village Chhoti where devotees from different places used to come for worship and sacrifice goats.

The history of present peasants of these villages is only around two hundred years old. Jats of two Gotras, Thakurela and Sinsinwars have established their families in this village. Two hundred years ago two families came from Darabar (Gonda) village and settled in Ballabh village. Similarly, other caste peoples like Jatav from Talesara and Darbar, Khatik, Dheevar, and Naai from other places came and settled in these villages. Earlier there was one family of a Muslim community also but now no Muslim family is existing in these villages.

This village is in Lagsama region-the land of Thakurela Jats.

== Population ==
Chhoti Ballabh is a medium size village located in Iglas Tehsil of Aligarh district, Uttar Pradesh with total 258 families residing. The Chhoti Ballabh village has population of 1501 of which 811 are males while 690 are females as per Population Census 2011.

In Chhoti Ballabh village population of children with age 0-6 is 187 which makes up 12.46% of total population of village. Average Sex Ratio of Chhoti Ballabh village is 851 which is lower than Uttar Pradesh state average of 912. Child Sex Ratio for the Chhoti Ballabh as per census is 889, lower than Uttar Pradesh average of 902.

Chhoti Ballabh village has higher literacy rate compared to Uttar Pradesh. In 2011, literacy rate of Chhoti Ballabh village was 71.16% compared to 67.68% of Uttar Pradesh. In Chhoti Ballabh male literacy stands at 85.96% while female literacy rate was 53.65%.

As per Constitution of India and Panchyati Raaj Act, Chhoti Ballabh village is administrated by Sarpanch (Head of Village) who is elected representative of village.

Schedule Caste constitutes 21.05% of total population in Chhoti Ballabh village. The village Chhoti Ballabh currently doesn't have any Schedule Tribe population.

In Chhoti Ballabh village out of total population, 530 were engaged in work activities. 73.58% of workers describe their work as Main Work (Employment or Earning more than 6 Months) while 26.42% were involved in Marginal activity providing livelihood for less than 6 months. Of 530 workers engaged in Main Work, 204 were cultivators (owner or co-owner) while 60 were Agricultural labourer.

== Education ==
There is an elementary school in the village called "PS CHHOTI BALLABH". The school was founded in 1979 and is under the control of the Department of Education. The school consists of Grades from 1 to 5. Hindi is the medium of instructions in this school.
