= Haziyapur =

- Village
- Country: India
- State: Uttar Pradesh
- District: Aligarh
- ISO 3166 code: IN-BR

Haziyapur is a village of Aligarh district of Uttar Pradesh, India. It was established about 150 years ago. It is situated about 1 km from the district Secretariat.
