= Hintersee =

Hintersee (German for either "rear lake" or "behind [the] lake") may refer to:

Municipalities:

- Hintersee, Mecklenburg-Vorpommern, a village in Landkreis Vorpommern-Greifswald, Mecklenburg-Vorpommern, Germany
- Hintersee, Austria, a village in Bezirk Salzburg-Umgebung, Austria
- Hintersee (Immenstadt im Allgäu), part of Immenstadt im Allgäu, Landkreis Oberallgäu, Bavaria, Germany
- Hintersee (Ramsau), part of Ramsau bei Berchtesgaden, Landkreis Berchtesgadener Land, Bavaria, Germany
- the former German name for Zajezierze, Pomeranian Voivodeship, in northern Poland

Lakes:

- Hintersee (Ramsauer Ache), Ramsau bei Berchtesgaden, Berchtesgadener Land, Bavaria, Germany
- Hintersee (Osterhorngruppe), in Flachgau, Salzburger Land, Austria
- Hintersee (Felbertal), in Felbertal, Mittersill, Salzburger Land, Austria
