= Nivsani =

- Village
- Chhalesar shown within the map of Uttar Pradesh Nivsani (India)
- Coordinates: 27.943370°N 77.733797°E
- Country: India
- State: Uttar Pradesh
- District: Aligarh

Nivsani is a village located in Kair Tehsil, in the Aligarh district of Uttar Pradesh, India.
