= Lodha, Aligarh =

Lodha Lodhaa
- Town & Block
- Location in Uttar Pradesh, India Lodha (India)
- Coordinates: 27.95°N 78.17°E
- Country: India
- State: Uttar Pradesh
- District: Aligarh

Government
  - Body: Gram panchayat
- Elevation: 189 m (620 ft)

Population
  - Total: 3,809

Languages
  - Official: Hindi
- Time zone: UTC+5:30 (IST)
- PIN: 202140
- Lok Sabha constituency: Aligarh

Lodha is a town and block in Aligarh district of Uttar Pradesh state, India. Lodha Block Head Quarters is the city of Lodha. It belongs to Aligarh division.
