= Kuliki, Sztum County =

Kuliki
- Settlement
- Location within Poland
- Coordinates: 53°53′57″N 18°58′29″E
- Country: Poland
- Voivodeship: Pomeranian
- County: Sztum
- Gmina: Sztum

Kuliki [kuˈliki] is a settlement in the administrative district of Gmina Sztum, within Sztum County, Pomeranian Voivodeship, in northern Poland.

For the history of the region, see History of Pomerania.
