= Uttampur =

Village in Uttar Pradesh

Uttampur is a village in Aligarh district and located 30 km from Aligarh. The village comes in block - Gonda, tehsil - Iglas, district - Aligarh, Uttar Pradesh.

The population of the village is around 1500. The main profession of the village people is agriculture and labour.
