= Gorai (surname) =

Gorai is a surname. Notable people with the surname include:

- Dinesh Chandra Gorai (1934–2024), Indian bishop
- Tom Gorai (born 1962), American film producer, screenwriter, and director
- Vladyslav Gorai (1967–2025), Ukrainian operatic tenor

== See also ==
- Gorai (disambiguation)
