= Gronajny =

- Village
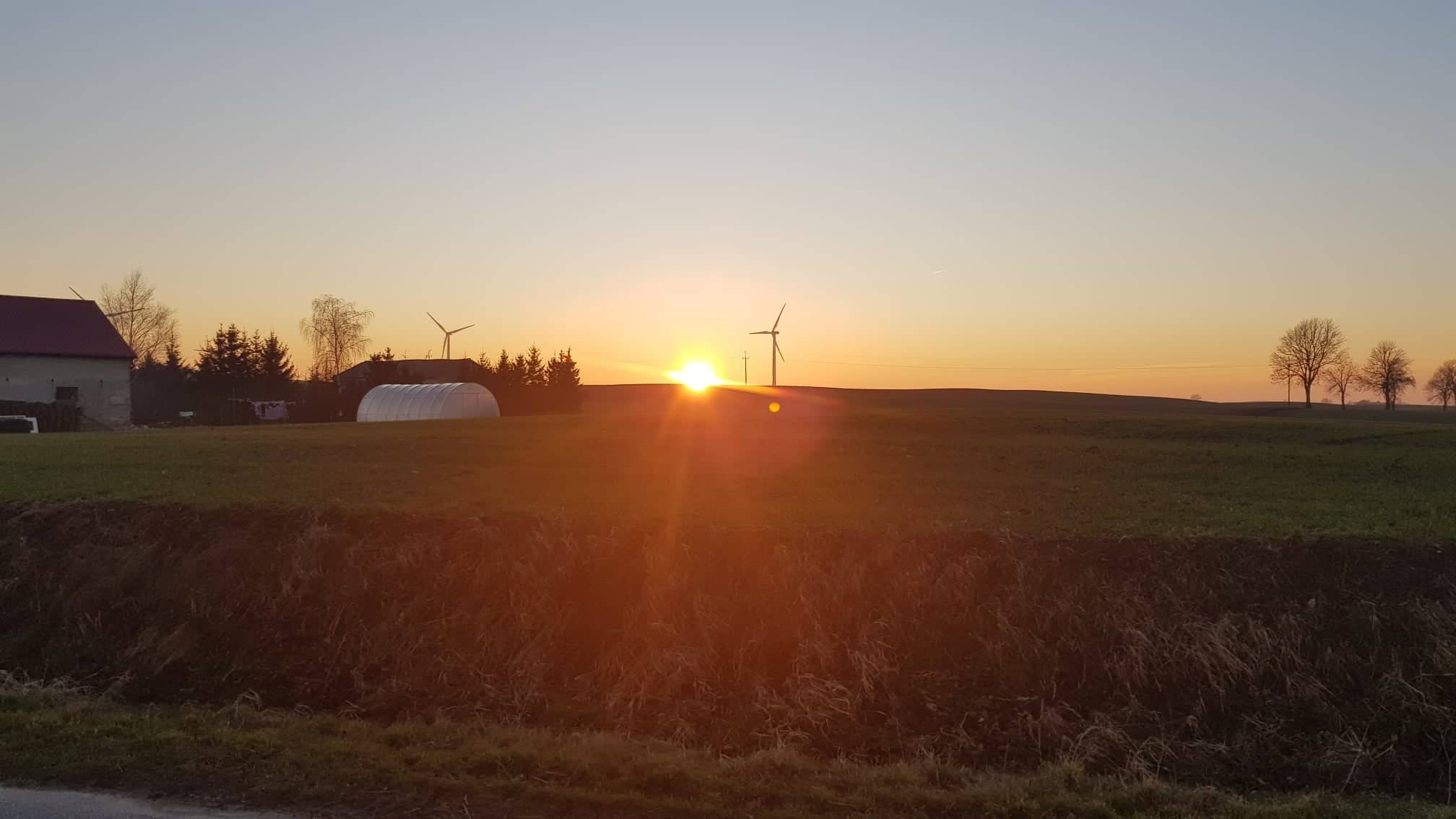

- Location within Poland
- Coordinates: 53°58′56″N 19°3′6″E
- Country: Poland
- Voivodeship: Pomeranian
- County: Sztum
- Gmina: Sztum

Population
  - Total: 210
- Postal code: 82-400
- Vehicle registration: GSZ

Gronajny [ɡrɔˈnai̯nɨ] is a village in the administrative district of Gmina Sztum, within Sztum County, Pomeranian Voivodeship, in northern Poland.
