= Jattari =

- Town
- Location in Uttar Pradesh, India Jattari (India)
- Coordinates: 28°01′N 77°39′E
- Country: India
- State: Uttar Pradesh
- District: Aligarh
- Tehsil: Khair

Government
  - Body: Nagar Panchayat
  - Chairman: Pradeep Bansal

Population (2011)
  - Total: 18,387

Language
  - Official: Hindi
- Time zone: UTC+5:30 (IST)
- PIN: 202137
- Telephone code: 05724
- Vehicle registration: UP 81

Jattari is a town. It comes under Khair Tehsil of Aligarh district in the Indian state of Uttar Pradesh. It lies on Aligarh–Palwal highway, 45 km ahead from Aligarh towards Palwal.

== Demographics ==
As of 2011 Indian Census, Jattari had a total population of 18,387, of which 9,793 were males and 8,594 were females. The population within the age group of 0 to 6 years was 2,800. The total number of literates in Jattari was 11,795, which constituted 64.2% of the population with male literacy of 72.8% and female literacy of 54.2%. The effective literacy rate of the 7+ population of Jattari was 75.7%, of which the male literacy rate was 86.4% and the female literacy rate was 63.6%. The Scheduled Castes population was 3,580. Jattari had 3057 households in 2011.

As of 2001 India census, Jattari had a population of 17,038. Males constituted 54% of the population and females 46%. Jattari had an average literacy rate of 58%, lower than the national average of 59.5%: male literacy was 69%, and female literacy is 45%. In Jattari, 18% of the population is under 6 years of age.

== Educational institute ==
1. Rajeev Gandhi Computer Saksharta Mission, Opp. Central Bank of India, Jattari
2. Diamond Academy
3. Gurukul Academy
4. Chaudhary coaching centre
5. Tripathi coaching centre
6. Endeavour English classes
7. Sarswati classes
8. Global Academy of Education

== Schools ==
1. Patel smarak inter college, Jattari

2. Natkhat Kanha School, Krishna Vihar Green City, Jattari

3. Shreeji Public School

4. Babuji Convent School

5. SD International School

6. Shree Radhekrishna Public School, Jattari

7. Global Rock World School, Jattari

8. Jeevan public school, Jattari

== Nearby cities ==
Palwal, Aligarh, Khair, Jewar, Greater Noida, Mathura and Agra. Fazilpur Kalan.

== Notable people ==
- Umesh Kaushik, co-founder of Xpert Times Network Private Limited & also known as a Music Producer and Actor
