= Czernin, Pomeranian Voivodeship =

Czernin
- Village
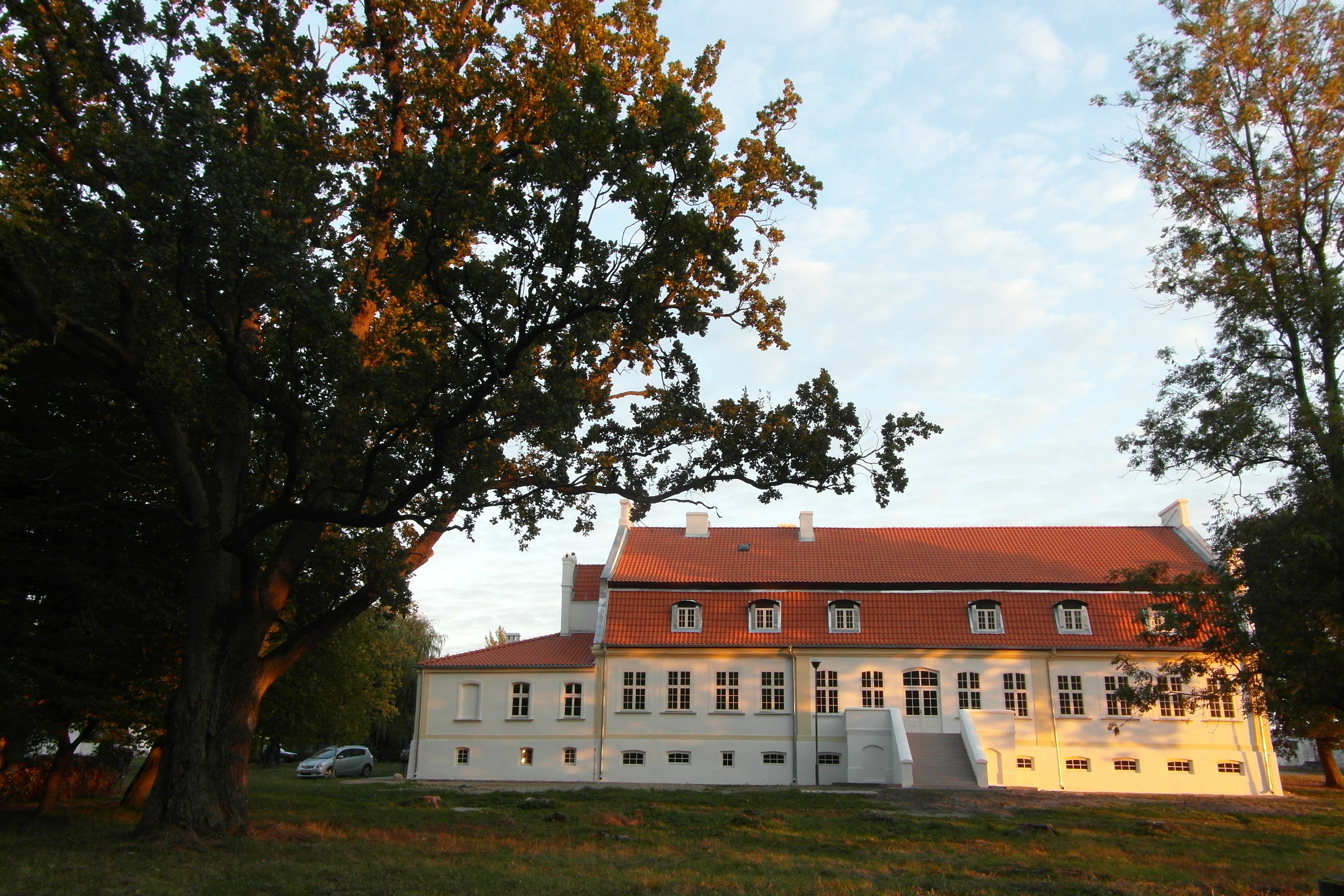
- Donimirski family manor in Czernin

- Location within Poland
- Coordinates: 53°54′19″N 19°3′52″E
- Country: Poland
- Voivodeship: Pomeranian
- County: Sztum
- Gmina: Sztum

Population
  - Total: 1,600
- Time zone: UTC+1 (CET)
  - Summer (DST): UTC+2 (CEST)
- Vehicle registration: GSZ

Czernin ([ˈt͡ʂɛrnin]) (German: Hohendorf) is a village in the administrative district of Gmina Sztum, within Sztum County, Pomeranian Voivodeship, in northern Poland.

It is located in the region of Powiśle.

== History ==
Czernin was a private village of Polish nobility, including the Kczewski family, administratively located in the Malbork Voivodeship of the Kingdom of Poland. In the First Partition of Poland (1772) it was annexed by Prussia, and from 1871 it was also part of Germany. The last heir of Czernin, Witold Donimirski was murdered by the German occupiers during World War II in the Sachsenhausen concentration camp in 1939. After Germany's defeat in the war in 1945, the village was restored to Poland.

== Cuisine ==
Czernin is the place of cultivation of the Czernin apple, which is named after the village, and is officially recognized by the Ministry of Agriculture and Rural Development of Poland as a traditional food.
