= Sztumskie Pole =

- Village
- Location within Poland
- Coordinates: 53°56′29″N 19°0′21″E
- Country: Poland
- Voivodeship: Pomeranian
- County: Sztum
- Gmina: Sztum
- Population: 460

Sztumskie Pole ([ˈʂtumskʲɛ ˈpɔlɛ]) (German: Stuhmerfelde) is a village in the administrative district of Gmina Sztum, within Sztum County, Pomeranian Voivodeship, in northern Poland.
