= Cygusy =

- Village
- Location within Poland
- Coordinates: 53°53′45″N 19°7′1″E
- Country: Poland
- Voivodeship: Pomeranian
- County: Sztum
- Gmina: Sztum
- Time zone: UTC+1 (CET)
  - Summer (DST): UTC+2 (CEST)
- Vehicle registration: GSZ

Cygusy [t͡sɨˈɡusɨ] is a village in the administrative district of Gmina Sztum, within Sztum County, Pomeranian Voivodeship, in northern Poland.

== History ==
Cygusy was a private village of Polish nobility, including the Szembek family, administratively located in the Malbork Voivodeship of the Kingdom of Poland. In 1772, it was annexed by the Kingdom of Prussia in the First Partition of Poland, and from 1871 it was also part of Germany. Following the restoration of independent Poland after World War I, a plebiscite was held to decide whether the area would remain in Germany or be reintegrated with Poland. 90% of the inhabitants voted for Poland, however, the village remained within Germany in the interbellum. Cygusy was eventually restored to Poland following the defeat of Germany in World War II in 1945.
