= Gościszewo =

- Village
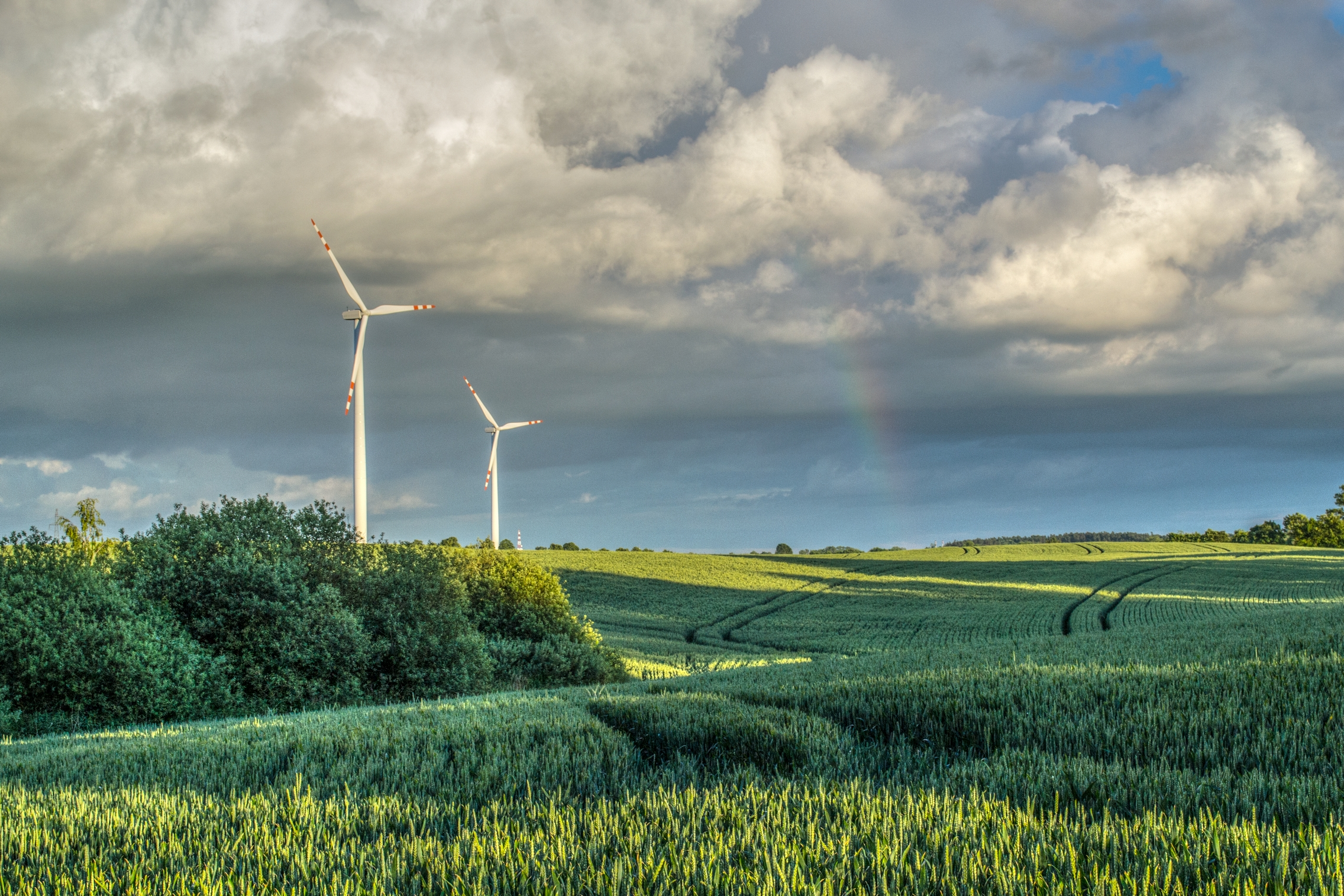

- Location within Poland
- Coordinates: 53°59′8″N 19°0′3″E
- Country: Poland
- Voivodeship: Pomeranian
- County: Sztum
- Gmina: Sztum
- Population: 580
- Time zone: UTC+1 (CET)
  - Summer (DST): UTC+2 (CEST)

Gościszewo (Polish: [ɡɔɕt͡ɕiˈʂɛvɔ]) (German: Braunswalde) is a village in the administrative district of Gmina Sztum, within Sztum County, Pomeranian Voivodeship, in northern Poland.
