= Goraj =

Goraj may refer to the following places:

- Goraj, Albania
- Goraj, Greater Poland Voivodeship (west-central Poland)
- Góraj, Greater Poland Voivodeship (west-central Poland)
- Goraj, Lublin Voivodeship (east Poland)
- Goraj, Lubusz Voivodeship (west Poland)
- Goraj, Pomeranian Voivodeship (north Poland)
