= Grzępa =

- Settlement
- Location within Poland
- Coordinates: 53°57′15″N 19°0′38″E
- Country: Poland
- Voivodeship: Pomeranian
- County: Sztum
- Gmina: Sztum
- Population: 10

Grzępa [ˈɡʐɛmpa] is a settlement in the administrative district of Gmina Sztum, within Sztum County, Pomeranian Voivodeship, in northern Poland.

For the history of the region, see History of Pomerania.
