= Mangarhi =

- Location within Uttar Pradesh Location within India
- Coordinates: 27°50′29″N 77°54′25″E
- Country: India
- State: Uttar Pradesh
- Division: Aligarh
- District(s): Aligarh
- Elevation: 178 m (584 ft)

Population (2001)
  - Total: 2,087
- Time zone: UTC+05:30 (IST)
- Pincode: 202123x
- Telephone: +0571
- Vehicle: UP-81

Mangarhi is a village in Aligarh district, Uttar Pradesh, India. The population of Mangarhi is estimated at 2500. Mangarhi is situated on the major road between Aligarh and Gonda. The main road from Mathura to Aligarh also passes through Mangarhi.

== Industry ==
The largest industries in Mangarhi are potato cultivation and wheat farming. There are a large number of cold storage units near Mangarhi in response to the demand for potato storage.
