= Parpary =

- Village
- Location within Poland
- Coordinates: 53°57′32″N 18°56′18″E
- Country: Poland
- Voivodeship: Pomeranian
- County: Sztum
- Gmina: Sztum
- Population: 210

Parpary [parˈparɨ] is a village in the administrative district of Gmina Sztum, within Sztum County, Pomeranian Voivodeship, in northern Poland.

For the history of the region, see History of Pomerania.
