= Brzezi Ostrów =

- Settlement
- Location within Poland
- Coordinates: 53°54′36″N 18°59′3″E
- Country: Poland
- Voivodeship: Pomeranian
- County: Sztum
- Gmina: Sztum

Brzezi Ostrów [ˈbʐɛʑi ˈɔstruf] is a settlement in the administrative district of Gmina Sztum, within Sztum County, Pomeranian Voivodeship, in northern Poland.

For the history of the region, see History of Pomerania.
