= Kępina, Pomeranian Voivodeship =

Kępina
- Village
- Location within Poland
- Coordinates: 53°56′24″N 19°3′18″E
- Country: Poland
- Voivodeship: Pomeranian
- County: Sztum
- Gmina: Sztum
- Population: 90

Kępina [kɛmˈpina] is a village in the administrative district of Gmina Sztum, within Sztum County, Pomeranian Voivodeship, in northern Poland.

Before 1772 the area was part of Kingdom of Poland, 1772-1945 Prussia and Germany. For the history of the region, see History of Pomerania.
