= Goetz Oertel =

American physicist and science manager (1934–2024)

Goetz Oertel (August 24, 1934 – May 18, 2021) was an American physicist and science manager.

== Youth ==
=== Flight from West Prussia ===
Oertel was born in Stuhm, West Prussia, Germany (today Sztum, Poland). In January 1945, Oertel escaped from the advancing Red Army with his parents, milling director Egon Oertel and his wife Margarete (née Wittek) westwards, initially to Gransee in Brandenburg, then continuing to Triptis in Thuringia which was captured by US forces rather than the Soviets. When Thuringia fell under Soviet control in the course of the Potsdam Agreement, the flight continued by horse and carriage, further westwards to Öhringen in southwestern Württemberg. Goetz's father was able to support the family through his hobby, genealogy. His hometown, lying east of the Oder–Neisse line, was transferred to Poland after the war.

=== Education ===
After the Abitur at the Robert-Mayer-High School in Heilbronn and first work experiences in the private economy at the energy corporation AEG in Stuttgart, Oertel commenced his studies of physics at the Christian-Albrechts University in Kiel in 1953. A son of a member of the Corps (student fraternity) Masovia, he equally sought membership in the Kiel Corps Palaiomarchia-Masovia, where he sustained in four fencing duels.

== Physicist in the U.S. ==
Goetz followed his supervisor of his doctoral thesis to the US in 1957 with a Fulbright stipend, and got a position as physics research associate at the University of Maryland. He married Brigitte Beckmann in 1960, and became neighbor as well as friends with Karl-Ludwig Stellmacher, a German – American mathematician.

After his successful PhD promotion he was hired by NASA in January 1963 at their Langley Research Center as a researcher. The agency promoted his naturalization to US citizenship and provided him with responsibility over a current research project. He had to convince the NASA and General Electric engineers that the project was unviable and had to be restructured substantially. At the same time, his experimental research results from his PhD thesis became published and resulted in the application for two patents.

=== Solar physics ===
In 1967, the NASA HQ offered Goetz Oertel a senior position in Washington, D.C. and thus enabled a continuation of his theoretical work. When he was finally named leader of the program of the ATM of Skylab, consequentially becoming responsible for continuously increasing roles and functions, and finally was promoted Chief of Solar Physics, he had to come to an end with his experimental work, albeit successfully.

=== Nuclear energy ===
In 1974, the Nixon administration drafted its Federal Executive Development Program, with the goal to reduce the isolation of the Federal ministries, specifically among the higher level civil servants, the so-called super-grades. As a consequence, management skills gained a higher weight than the academic knowledge of the subject matter. Around 8.000 mid-level civil servants had to apply for 25 positions. Oertel applied successfully and was offered „free choice“ among the Federal ministries. After the introduction course in Charlottesville, South Carolina he became, for six months each, scientific advisor to the President and at the Office of Management and Budget of the President's Office – Department for Space, Science and Energy. In 1975, he was appointed Head of the Astronomy Program at the Ministry of Science, and in 1976 Chief of Staff of the Assistant Administrator for nuclear energy. From 1977 to 1984, he served as director for nuclear energy facilities (including nuclear waste- and secondary products of the defense sector) in the newly created Department of Energy. New positions at the Savannah River Site in South Carolina in Albuquerque brought responsibilities for 32,000 employees and an overall budget of USD 3 billion.

=== Astronomy ===
Oertel returned to the Ministry of Energy in 1985 as deputy assistant. Dealing with the consequences of the Challenger space shuttle accident and the Chernobyl disaster, the appointment to President and Chief Executive of AURA came at a suitable moment. AURA operated the Hubble Space Telescope, space- and solar observatories in Arizona, New Mexico and Chile, and, more recently, also the Gemini Observatorys in Hawaii and Chile. After thirteen successful years at this position, Oertel finally declined a five-year renewal of his contract.

== Honorations ==
Oertel remained an active member of The National Academy of Sciences, and continued his work for various foundations and universities, as well as for ministries of science in North- and South America. The National Academies had elected him as Associate for life. The American Society of Mechanical Engineers honored him with the Dixy Lee Ray Prize. Finally, the International Astronomic Union baptized an asteroid after him: 5074 Goetzoertel.

== Personal life and death ==
Oertel and his wife had one daughter and one son. He was a member of the Corps Masovia and Palaiomarchia. He was an active member of the Cosmos Club in Washington D.C.

Goetz Oertel died on May 18, 2021, at the age of 86.
