= Iglas Assembly constituency =

Constituency of the Uttar Pradesh legislative assembly in India

Coordinates: 27.71°N 77.94°E

Iglas
- Constituency No. 77 for the Uttar Pradesh Legislative Assembly

Constituency details
- Country: India
- Region: North India
- State: Uttar Pradesh
- District: Aligarh
- Lok Sabha constituency: Hathras
- Total electors: 3,96,755
- Reservation: SC

Member of Legislative Assembly
- 18th Uttar Pradesh Legislative Assembly
- Incumbent Rajkumar Sahyogi
- Elected year: 2019

Iglas is a constituency of the Uttar Pradesh Legislative Assembly covering the city of Iglas in the Aligarh district of Uttar Pradesh, India.

Iglas is one of five assembly constituencies in the Hathras Lok Sabha constituency. It is a highly Jat dominated seat with 40% Jat vote but it is reserved for SC category.

== Members of Legislative Assembly ==
- 1951: Sheodan Singh, Indian National Congress
- 1957: Kishori Raman Singh, Independent
- 1962: Sheodan Singh, Independent
- 1967: M. L. Gautam, Indian National Congress
- 1969: Gayatri Devi, Bharatiya Kranti Dal
- 1974: Rajendra Singh, Bharatiya Kranti Dal
- 1977: Rajendra Singh, Janata Party
- 1980: Pooran Chand, Indian National Congress (Indira)
- 1985: Rajendra Singh, Lok Dal
- 1989: Bijendra Singh, Indian National Congress
- 1991: Gyanwati Singh, Janata Dal
- 1993: Bijendra Singh, Indian National Congress
- 1996: Malkhan Singh, Bhartiya Janta Party
- 2002: Bijendra Singh, Indian National Congress
- 2004 (By-elections): Mukul Upadhyay Bahujan Samaj Party
- 2007: Bimlesh Singh, Rashtriya Lok Dal
- 2012: Triloki Ram, Rashtriya Lok Dal
- 2017: Rajvir Singh Diler, Bharatiya Janata Party
- 2017 (By-elections): Rajkumar Sahyogi, Bharatiya Janata Party
- 2022: Rajkumar Sahyogi, Bharatiya Janata Party

== Election results ==
=== 2027 ===
2027 Uttar Pradesh Legislative Assembly election: Iglas
Party	Candidate	Votes	%	±%
INDIA				
NDA				
BSP				
NOTA	None of the above			
Majority				
Turnout				
gain from		Swing		

=== 2022 ===
2022 Uttar Pradesh Legislative Assembly election: Iglas
Party	Candidate	Votes	%	±%
BJP	Rajkumar Sahyogi	127,209	52.35	▲0.68
RLD	Birpal Singh	68,046	28.0	
BSP	Sushil Kumar	37,980	15.63	▼18.33
INC	Priti Singh	7,797	3.21	▼4.16
NOTA	None of the above	1,090	0.45	▼0.30
Majority		59,163	24.35	▲6.64
Turnout		243,015	61.25	▲22.46
BJP hold				

=== 2019 bypoll ===
By-election, 2019: Iglas
Party	Candidate	Votes	%	±%
BJP	Rajkumar Sahyogi	75,673	51.67	▼3.12
BSP	Abhay Kumar	49,736	33.96	▲11.19
INC	Umesh Kumar	10,795	7.37	
LKD	Mukesh Kumar	4,796	3.27	
Rashtriya Shoshit Samaj Party	Harisha Kumar Dhangar	2,762	1.89	
NOTA	None of the above	1098	0.75	▲0.27
Majority		25937	17.71	▼14.31
Turnout		146452	38.79	▲26.17
BJP hold		Swing		

=== 2017 ===
2017 Uttar Pradesh Legislative Assembly Election: Iglas
Party	Candidate	Votes	%	±%
BJP	Rajvir Singh Diler	128,000	54.79	
BSP	Rajendra Kumar	53,200	22.77	
RLD	Sulekha Singh	28,141	12.05	
INC	Guroovindar Singh	20,934	8.96	
NOTA	None of the above	1,122	0.48	
Majority		74,800	32.02	
Turnout		233,621	64.96	
