= Węgry, Pomeranian Voivodeship =

Węgry
- Village
- Location within Poland
- Coordinates: 53°58′28″N 18°58′13″E
- Country: Poland
- Voivodeship: Pomeranian
- County: Sztum
- Gmina: Sztum
- Population: 150

Węgry ([ˈvɛnɡrɨ]) (German: Wengern) is a village in the administrative district of Gmina Sztum, within Sztum County, Pomeranian Voivodeship, in northern Poland.

For the history of the region, see History of Pomerania.
