= Nowa Wieś, Sztum County =

Nowa Wieś
- Village
- Location within Poland
- Coordinates: 53°52′25″N 19°0′8″E
- Country: Poland
- Voivodeship: Pomeranian
- County: Sztum
- Gmina: Sztum
- Population: 520

Nowa Wieś [ˈnɔva ˈvjɛɕ] is a village in the administrative district of Gmina Sztum, within Sztum County, Pomeranian Voivodeship, in northern Poland.

For the history of the region, see History of Pomerania.
