= Triloki Ram =

Indian politician

MLA, 16th Legislative Assembly
- Incumbent
- Assumed office Mar 2012
- Constituency: Iglas

Personal details
- Born: January 16, 1948 Nasirpur, Hathras, Uttar Pradesh
- Died: 9 October 2022 (aged 74) New Delhi
- Citizenship: India
- Party: Rashtriya Lok Dal
- Spouse: Maya Devi
- Children: 4
- Parent: Ninnu Ram (father)
- Occupation: Real estate
- Profession: Politician

Triloki Ram was an Indian politician and a member of the 16th Legislative Assembly of Uttar Pradesh of India. He represented the Iglas constituency of Uttar Pradesh and was a member of the Rashtriya Lok Dal.

== Early life and education ==
Triloki Ram was born in Nasirpur, Hathras, Uttar Pradesh. He earned a bachelor's degree.

== Political career ==
Triloki Ram was a MLA for one term. He represented the Iglas constituency and was a member of the Rashtriya Lok Dal.

== Posts Held ==
#	From	To	Position	Comments
01	2012	Incumbent	Member, 16th Legislative Assembly	

== See also ==
- Iglas
- Politics of India
- Sixteenth Legislative Assembly of Uttar Pradesh
- Uttar Pradesh Legislative Assembly
