= Postolin, Pomeranian Voivodeship =

Postolin
- Village
- Location within Poland
- Coordinates: 53°52′17″N 19°3′27″E
- Country: Poland
- Voivodeship: Pomeranian
- County: Sztum
- Gmina: Sztum
- Population: 510
- Website: http://postolin.w.interia.pl

Postolin [pɔsˈtɔlin] is a village in the administrative district of Gmina Sztum, within Sztum County, Pomeranian Voivodeship, in northern Poland.

Before 1772 the area was part of Kingdom of Poland, and in 1772–1945 it belonged to Prussia and Germany. For the history of the region, see History of Pomerania.
