= Ogipur =

- Interactive map of Ogipur
- Country: India
- State: Uttar Pradesh
- District: Aligarh
- Block: Chandaus
- Elevation: 197 m (646 ft)

Ogipur is a small village located in the border of Chandaus Block, in the Aligarh District of the Indian state of Uttar Pradesh.

== Demographics ==
The population is about 1,197 (according to Census 2011 information). The primary languages are Hindi and Urdu.

== Geography ==
It is located about 388 km from the state capital, Lucknow. Ogipur is elevated 197 meters above sea level. Amritpur Bakhatpur (2 KM), Jahrana (2 KM), Imlahara (2 KM), Navabpur (2 KM) and Nagala Sarua (3 KM) are the nearby villages. This village is surrounded by Araniya Block to the north, Khair Block to the south, Khurja Block to the west and Jawan Sikanderpur Block to the east. This place is in the border of the Aligarh and Bulandshahr Districts. Bulandshahr District Araniya is North of this place.
