= Nowiny, Gmina Sztum =

Nowiny
- Settlement
- Location within Poland
- Coordinates: 53°51′45″N 19°1′4″E
- Country: Poland
- Voivodeship: Pomeranian
- County: Sztum
- Gmina: Sztum

Nowiny [nɔˈvinɨ] is a settlement in the administrative district of Gmina Sztum, within Sztum County, Pomeranian Voivodeship, in northern Poland.

For the history of the region, see History of Pomerania.
