= Ząbrowo, Pomeranian Voivodeship =

Ząbrowo
- Village
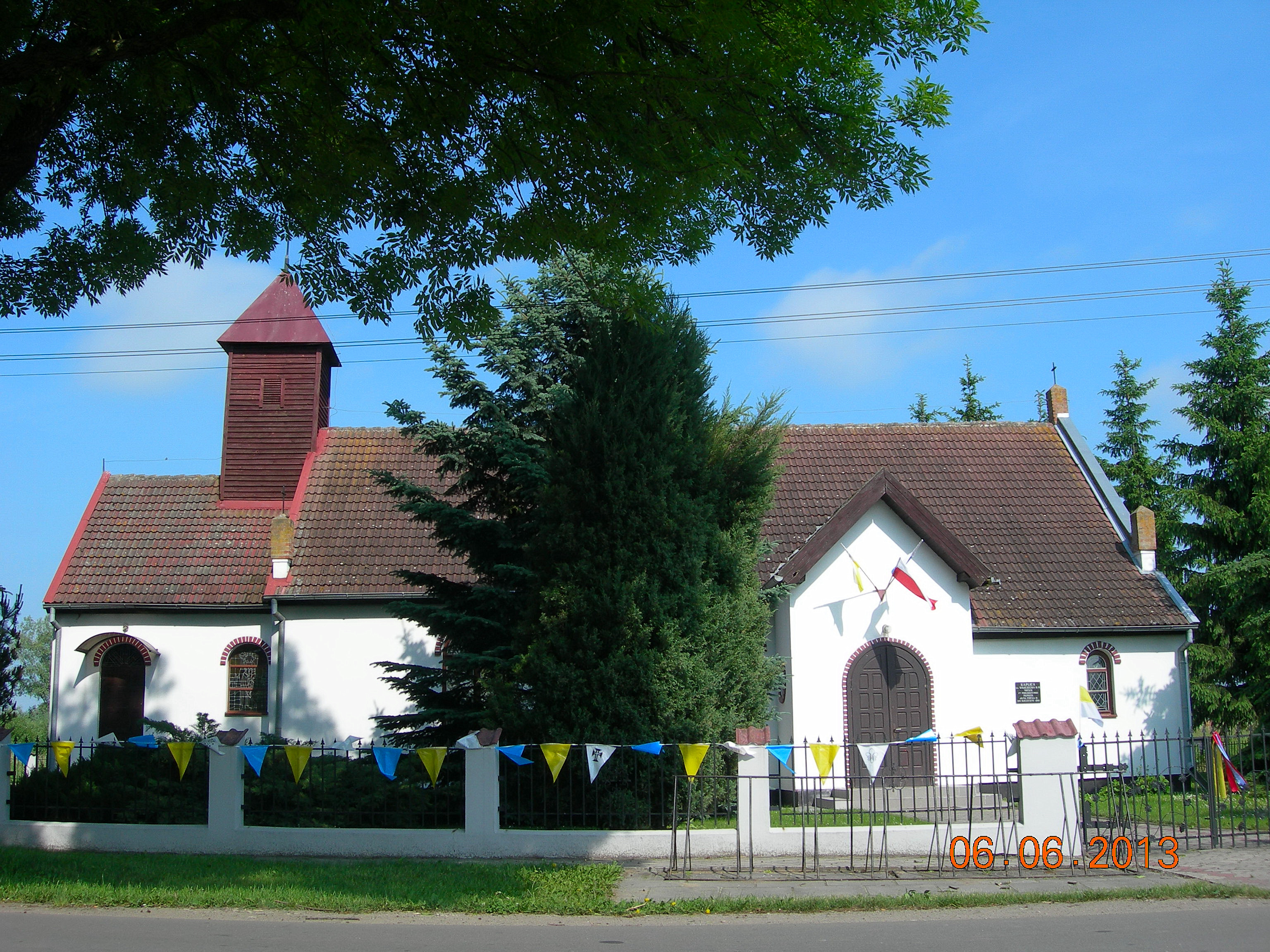
- Ząbrowo kaplica

- Location within Poland
- Coordinates: 54°5′26″N 19°13′1″E
- Country: Poland
- Voivodeship: Pomeranian
- County: Malbork
- Gmina: Stare Pole
- Population: 423

Ząbrowo [zɔmˈbrɔvɔ] is a village in the administrative district of Gmina Stare Pole, within the Malbork County of Pomeranian Voivodeship in northern Poland.

Before 1945, the area was a part of Germany. For the history of the region, please see History of Pomerania.
