= Janki Ballabh Shastri =

Indian Hindi writer, including poet and critic (1916-2011)

- Born: 5 February 1916; Maigra, Gaya, Bihar, India
- Died: 7 April 2011 (aged 95); Muzaffarpur, Bihar, India
- Occupations: Writer, including poet and critic

Acharya Janki Ballabh Shastri (5 February 1916 – 7 April 2011) was an Indian Hindi writer, including poet and critic.

He declined to accept Padma Shri in 2010 stating his disciples and younger generation deserve the award more than him. He also refused the Padmashri in 1994.

== Early life ==
Janki Ballabh Shastri was born at Maigra village in Gaya district in a Bhumihar Brahmin family.

== Career ==
Shastri has written many well-known stories, novels, plays, biographies, essays, ghazals and songs.

Among his famous works are "Bandi Mandiram", "Kakali", Radha (an epic running in seven volumes), Roop Aaroop, Teer Tarang, Meghgeet, "Gaatha", Pashani, Tamsa, Iravati, Kalidas (novel), Ek kiran so Jhaian (short stories), "Trai" and "Unkaha Niral".

== Awards ==
Shastri has been a recipient of various awards, including the Rajendra Shikhar Award, Bharat Bharti Award and Shiv Poojan Sahay Award.
