= Gonda, Aligarh =

Gonda
- Town
- Location in Uttar Pradesh, India Gonda (India) Gonda (Asia)
- Coordinates: 27.83°N 77.88°E
- Country: India
- State: Uttar Pradesh
- District: Aligarh
- Tehsil: Iglas
- Elevation: 178 m (584 ft)

Population (2011)
  - Total: 8,861
- Time zone: UTC+5:30 (IST)
- PIN: 202124,202123
- Telephone code: 05724
- Vehicle registration: UP-81

Gonda is a town in Aligarh district in the Indian state of Uttar Pradesh.

== Geography ==
Gonda - The rapidly growing town is a commercial and educational hub for 80–100 villages located in this region (Lagasma). It is well connected by road and is a junction of Mathura-Raya-Gorai-Aligarh and Agra-Hathras-Iglas-Khair-Delhi road. It is situated at 21 km from G.T.Road at Aligarh, 23 km from Aligarh Junction Railway Station and 41 km from Taj Expressway at Tappal.

Gonda was developed in the last 25 years across the Iglas-Khair Road. It extends from Dhand towards Khair. However, there is limited good development seen on Gonda -Aligarh roads up to water tank. 21 km from Gonda is Aligarh city. The road from Gonda to Aligarh is called Gonda-Aligarh Road. Another Name of Gonda Area is Lagasama. Murwar is a village situated 5 km from Gonda on the Gonda Iglas Road (Also called Khair - Hathras road). Gonda is one of the upcoming blocks of Aligarh district. The block is outside the village near Bijalighar.

== Demographics ==
As of 2001 India census, Gonda had a population of about 7550 as per 2001 census.

== Nearby villages ==
- Uttampur
- Mangarhi
- Basai
- Dhantauli
- Dhukpura
- Baraula
- Gurjnagriya
