= Sztum =

Town in Pomeranian Voivodeship, Poland

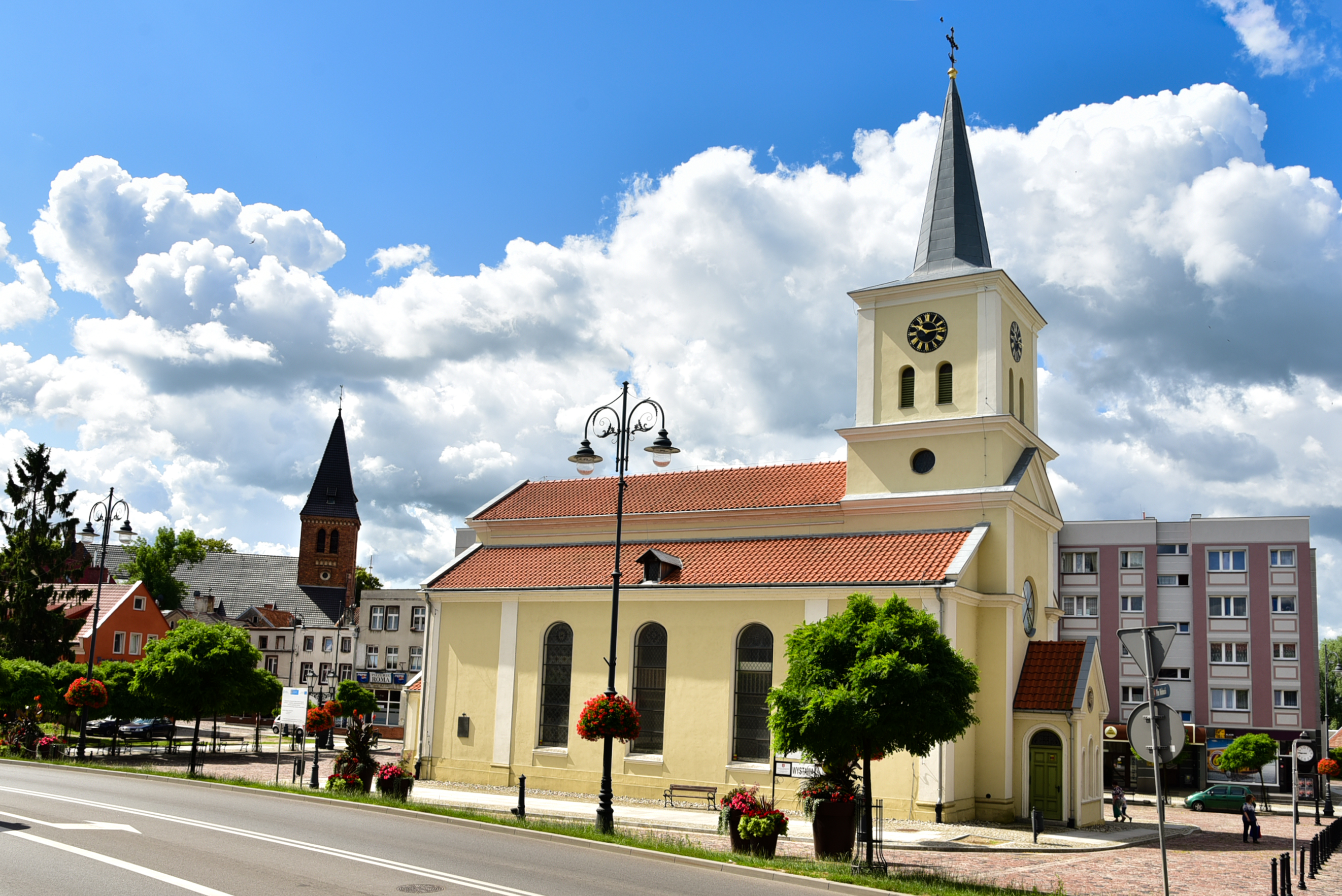
- Center of Sztum with the Church of Our Lady Help of Christians in the foreground and Church of Saint Anne in the background

- Flag Coat of arms

- Location within Poland
- Coordinates: 53°55′18″N 19°2′1″E
- Country: Poland
- Voivodeship: Pomeranian
- County: Sztum
- Gmina: Sztum
- Established: 13th century
- Town rights: 1416

Government
  - Mayor: Leszek Jan Tabor (L)

Area
  - Total: 4.59 km^{2} (1.77 sq mi)

Population (2006)
  - Total: 9,945
  - Density: 2,170/km^{2} (5,610/sq mi)
- Time zone: UTC+1 (CET)
  - Summer (DST): UTC+2 (CEST)
- Postal code: 82-400
- Area code: +48 55
- Car plates: GSZ
- Website: sztum.pl

Sztum (Polish pronunciation: [ʂtum]; formerly German: Stuhm) is a town in northern Poland in the Powiśle region, located in the Pomeranian Voivodeship. It is the capital of Sztum County, with some 10,141 inhabitants (2004).

== History ==
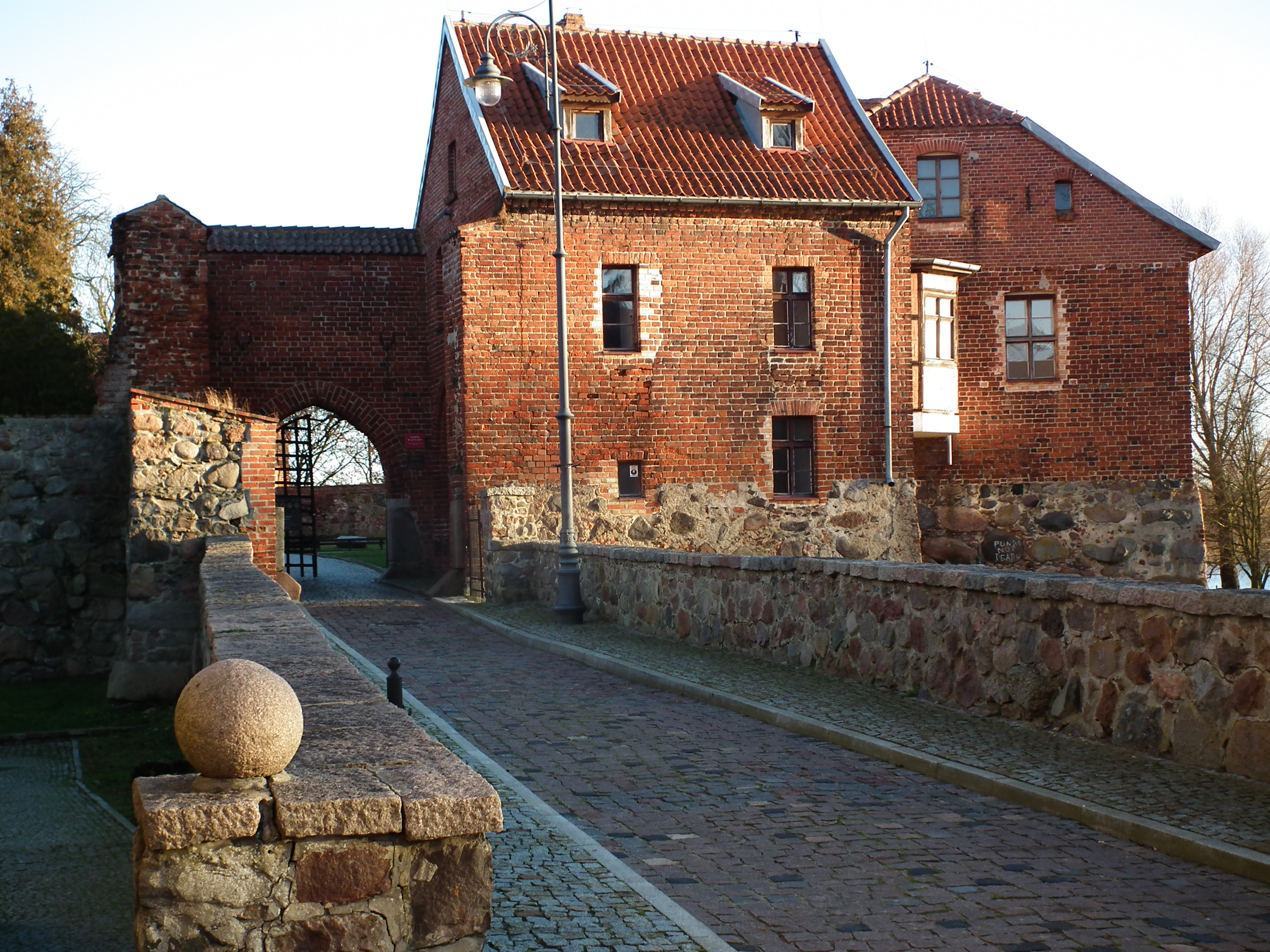
Sztum Castle

Signs of settlement dating back to the Roman Empire era have been found. In the early Middle Ages, a fortified settlement of the Old Prussians existed at the site, conquered by the Teutonic Knights in 1236. The castle was captured by the Poles after the Battle of Grunwald in 1410. Town rights were granted to the settlement in 1416 and confirmed by King Sigismund II Augustus in 1553.

In 1441 both the town and the local Teutonic county official joined the Prussian Confederation, which opposed Teutonic rule, and upon the request of which King Casimir IV Jagiellon incorporated the territory to the Kingdom of Poland in 1454. The castle, which initially remained in the hands of the Teutonic Knights, was captured by Poles after a siege in 1454, but later it was taken over by the Teutonic Knights again. In 1466 by the Second Peace of Toruń the town was finally renounced by the Teutonic Knights and integrated with the Kingdom of Poland. As part of Poland, the town functioned as a seat of the Sztum County in Malbork Voivodeship and a place to hold the voivodeship's sejmiks (regional court sessions). The Sztum Castle was the seat of the local starosts. In 1506 and 1512 the town was visited by Nicolaus Copernicus, and in 1552 it was visited by Polish King Sigismund II Augustus.

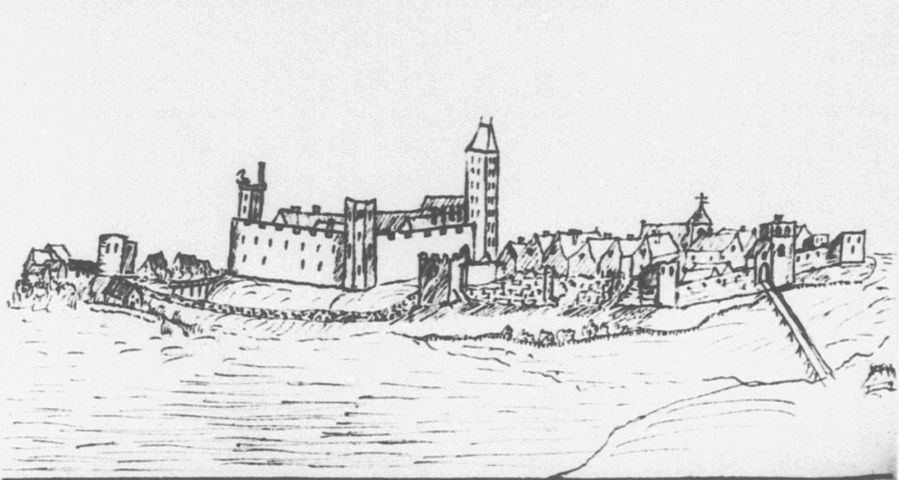
18th-century drawing of Sztum

In 1772 as a result of the First Partition of Poland the town was annexed by the Kingdom of Prussia. In October–December 1831, some Polish infantry units and intendant troops of the November Uprising stopped in the town on the way to their final internment places. In 1871, it became part of the newly created German Empire. In 1910, the Polish Bank Ludowy was founded in the town. In Stuhm, the German dialect High Prussian was spoken. Today, the German dialects are extinct.

According to the Treaty of Versailles, after World War I the inhabitants of the town and its district were asked whether they want to remain in Germany or join the new Second Polish Republic in the East Prussian plebiscite of 1920. Ultimately in Stuhm, 2,079 (73.5%) votes were cast in favor of remaining in Germany and 751 (26.5%) votes were in favor of rejoining Poland. Based on that result, Stuhm was included in the Regierungsbezirk Marienwerder within East Prussia in Germany. In the interwar period, Sztum remained one of the main centers of the Polish community in the area. The Germans arrested 30 local Polish activists in August 1939, before the invasion of Poland which started World War II. During the war, the Germans operated a Nazi prison in the town. After World War II, Sztum again became part of Poland, under territorial changes demanded by the Soviet Union at the Potsdam Conference.

On 14 July 2012 the town and surrounding areas, including Barlewice, were hit by a Low-End F3/T6 tornado, resulting in one injury. Buildings saw significant roof damage, some of which were entirely torn off. Other buildings were damaged as well. The tornado was part of an outbreak that produced several tornadoes, one of which killed a person.

=== Number of inhabitants by year ===
Historical population

Year	Pop.	±%
1789	509	—
1831	956	+87.8%
1875	2,145	+124.4%
1880	2,210	+3.0%
1890	2,265	+2.5%

Year	Pop.	±%
1905	2,557	+12.9%
1933	6,147	+140.4%
1939	7,374	+20.0%
1943	7,099	−3.7%
2006	9,945	+40.1%

Historic churches in Sztum

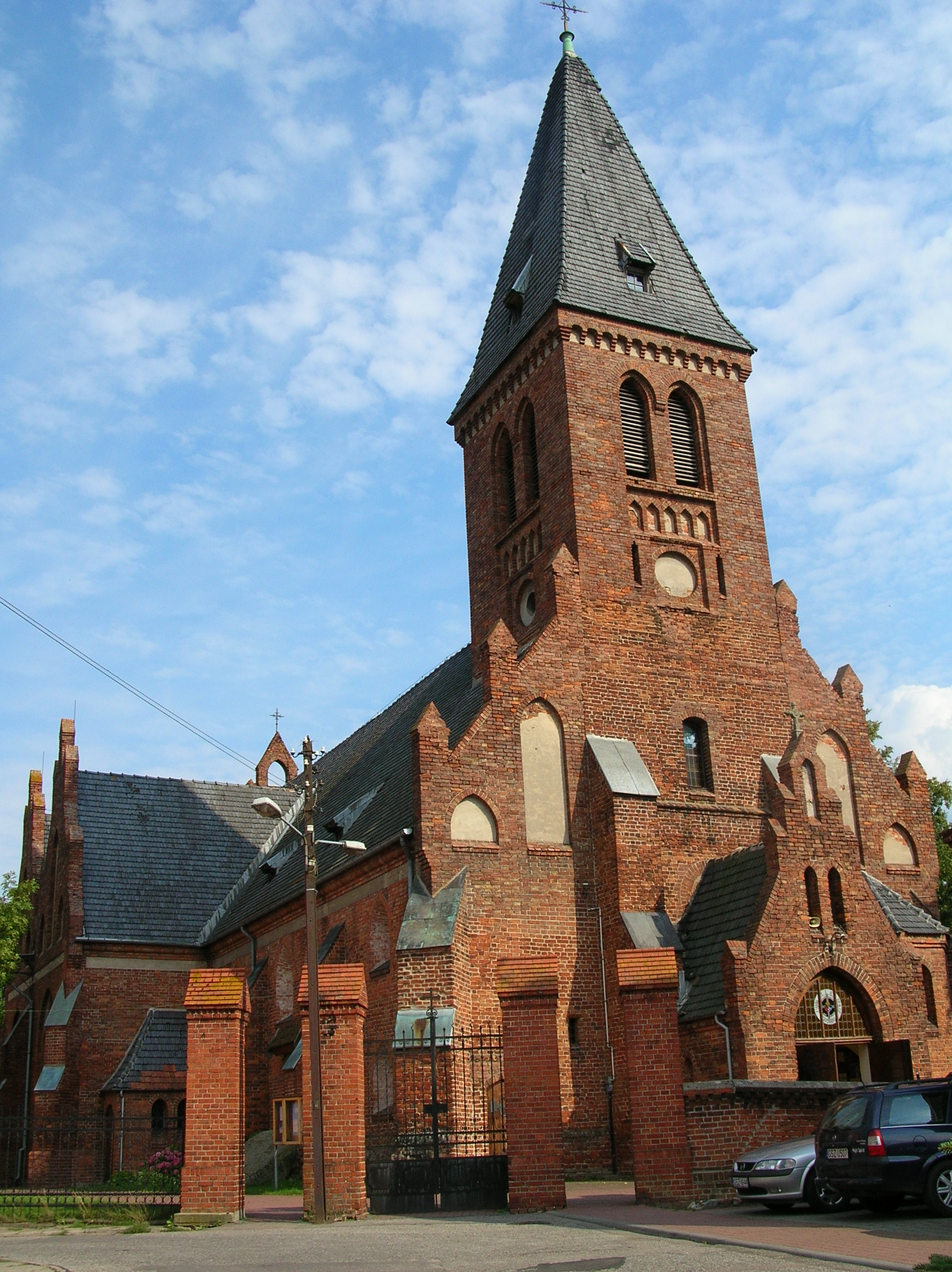
Saint Anne

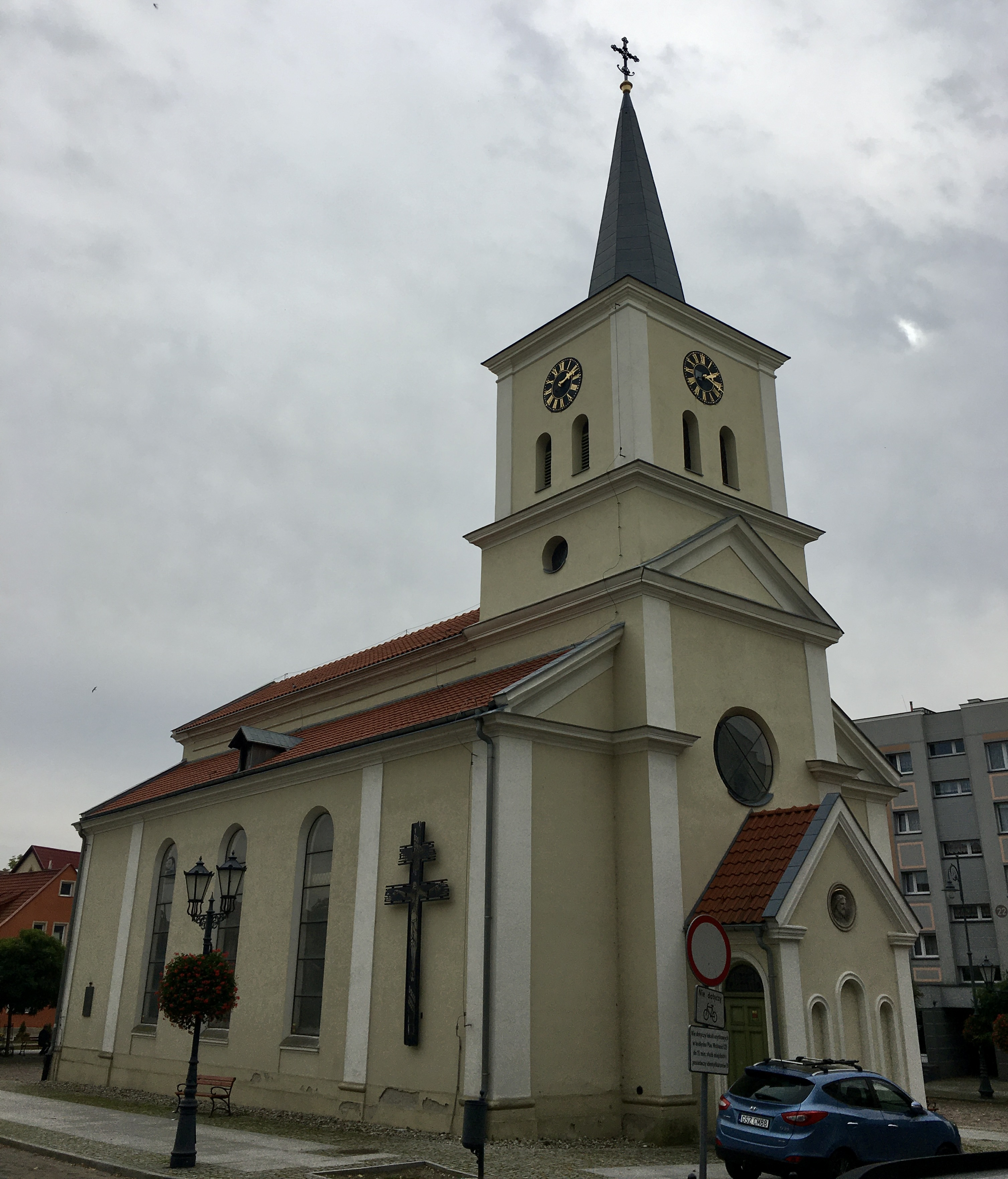
Our Lady Help of Christians

== Transport ==
The Polish National road 55 and Voivodeship road 517 pass through the town, and there is also a train station on the Malbork-Kwidzyn railway line.

== Sports ==
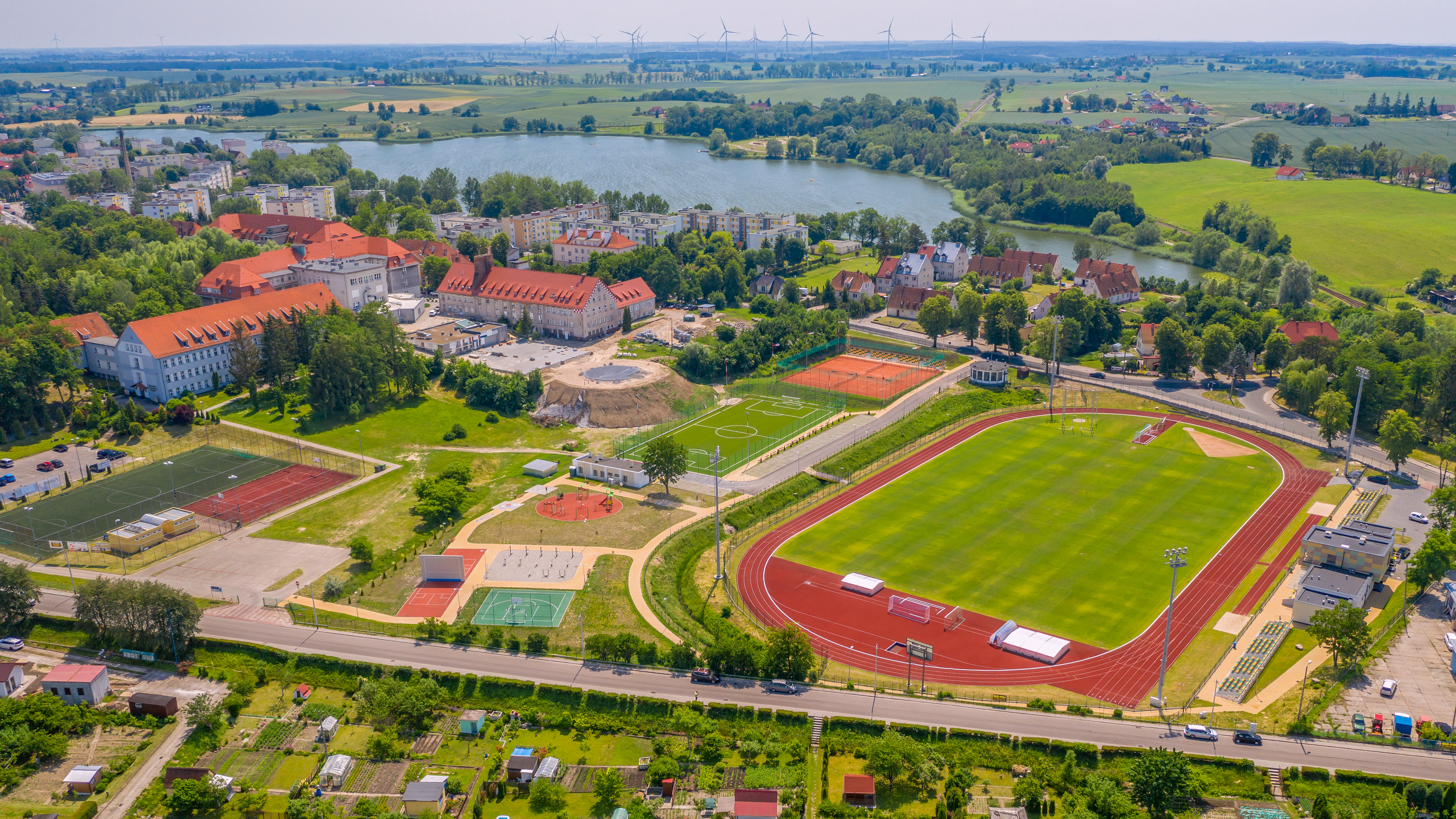
Stadium in Sztum

Local sports clubs include football club Olimpia Sztum, which competes in the lower leagues, and athletics club Zantyr Sztum.

== Notable residents ==
- Emil Stumpp (1886–1941) a German painter teacher and artist known for his cartoons and drawings of well-known people including an unfavourable one in 1933 of Adolf Hitler
- Goetz Oertel (born 1934) an American physicist and science manager
- Richard Nowakowski (born 1955) a retired boxer, competed for East Germany, silver medallist 1976 Summer Olympics and bronze medallist 1980 Summer Olympics
- Jacek Frąckiewicz (born 1969) a former Polish footballer, 169 pro games
- Monika Merl (born 1979) a German 800 meter runner
- Wojciech Tyszyński (born 1984) a Polish sprint canoer competed in the 2008 Summer Olympics
- Wojciech Zyska (born 1994) a Polish footballer
- Katarzyna Janiszewska (born 1995) a Polish handball player
- Joanna Kozłowska (born 1995) a Polish handball player

== International relations ==
Sztum is twinned with:

Ritterhude, Germany	Val de Reuil France	Varde, Denmark	Vorkuta, Russia
