= Nogat =

River in northern Poland

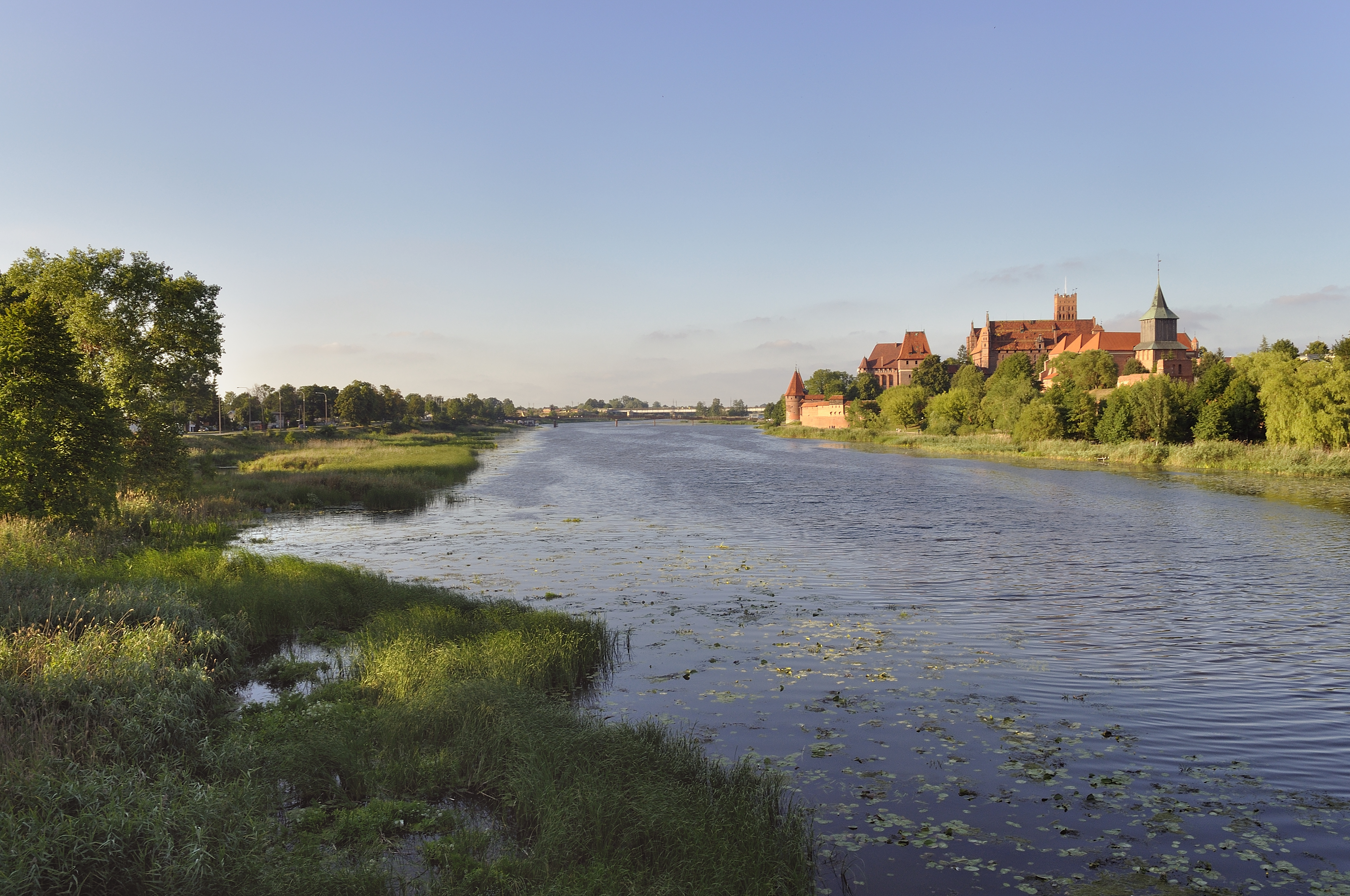
- Nogat river in Malbork with the Malbork Castle on the right

- Location of the mouth in Poland

Location
- Country: Poland
- Voivodeship: Pomeranian

Physical characteristics
- Source
  - location: Distributary of the Vistula River near Biała Góra
  - coordinates: 53°54′43″N 18°52′47″E
- Mouth
  - location: Vistula Lagoon
  - coordinates: 54°16′38″N 19°15′38″E
- Length: 62 km (39 mi)
- Basin size: 1,130 km^{2} (440 sq mi)

Basin features
- Landmarks: Malbork Castle

The Nogat is a 62 kilometres (39 mi) long delta branch of the Vistula River in northern Poland. Unlike the main river, it does not empty into Gdańsk Bay, but rather into the Vistula Lagoon.

The Nogat has its origin near the village of Biała Góra as a distributary of the Vistula River. Shortly afterwards, the river Liwa flows into the Nogat. The river then passes Malbork and flows north-east towards Elbląg (but does not reach the city). North-west of Elbląg, the Nogat flows into the south-western part of the Vistula Lagoon.

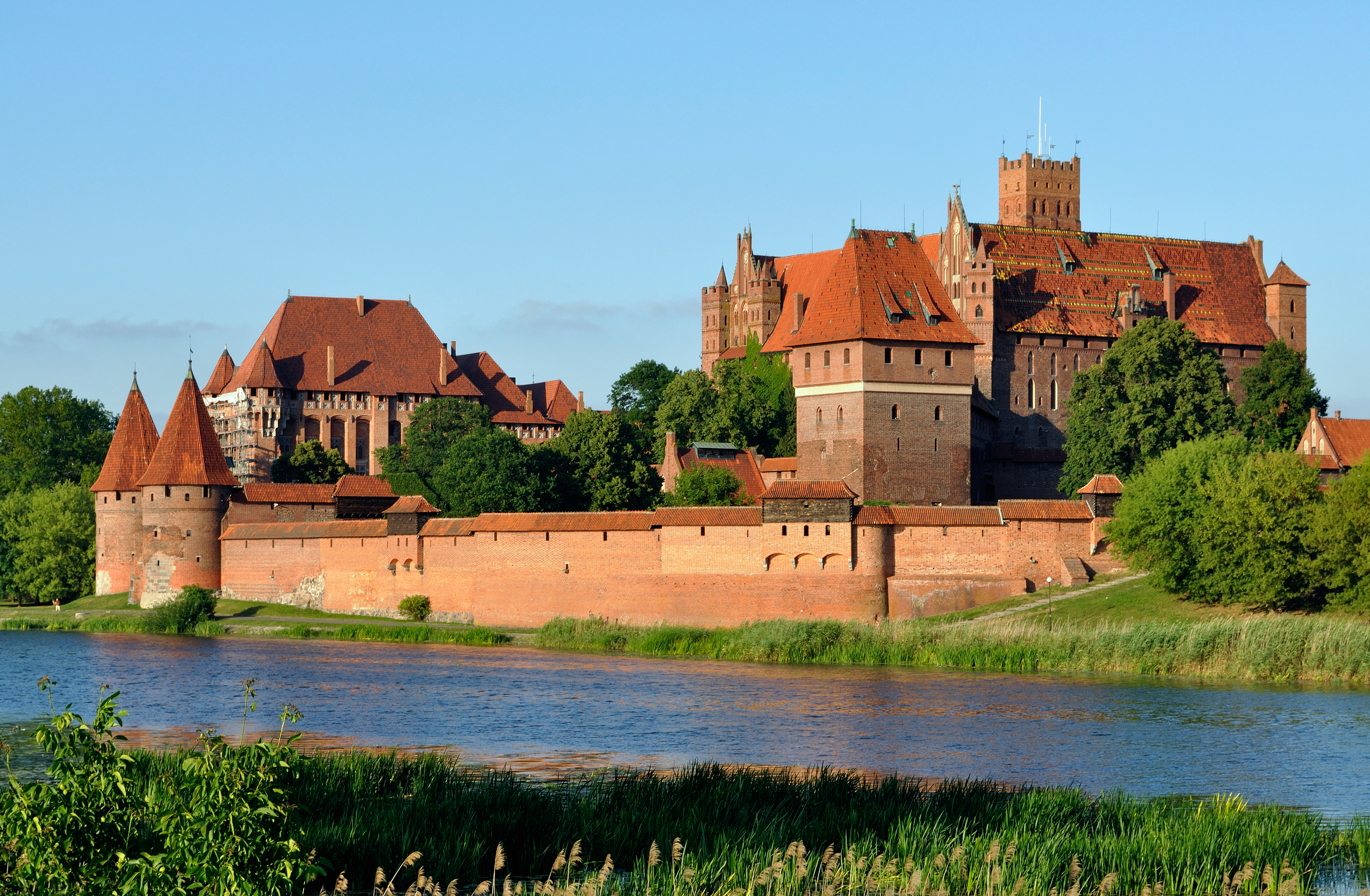
The brick-built Malbork Castle on the River Nogat

The river was located within the Kingdom of Poland until the First Partition of Poland in 1772, when it was annexed by Prussia, and from 1871 it was also part of Germany. During the interwar period, the Nogat formed the boundary between Germany and the Free City of Danzig (Gdańsk). It again became part of Poland in 1945, following Germany's defeat in World War II.
