= Goraj, Pomeranian Voivodeship =

Goraj
- Settlement
- Location within Poland
- Coordinates: 53°57′49″N 19°0′28″E
- Country: Poland
- Voivodeship: Pomeranian
- County: Sztum
- Gmina: Sztum
- Population: 10

Goraj ([ˈɡɔrai̯]) (German: Gorrey) is a settlement in the administrative district of Gmina Sztum, within Sztum County, Pomeranian Voivodeship, in northern Poland.

For the history of the region, see History of Pomerania.
