= Rajkumar Sahyogi =

Indian politician

Rajkumar Sahyogi is an Indian politician. He was elected to the Uttar Pradesh Legislative Assembly from Iglas in the 2019 by election as a member of the Bharatiya Janata Party. By-election happened due to Rajvir Singh Diler being elected to Parliament.
