= Barlewice =

- Village
- Location within Poland
- Coordinates: 53°55′19″N 19°3′58″E
- Country: Poland
- Voivodeship: Pomeranian
- County: Sztum
- Gmina: Sztum

Population
  - Total: 490
- Time zone: UTC+1 (CET)
  - Summer (DST): UTC+2 (CEST)
- Vehicle registration: GSZ

Barlewice [barlɛˈvit͡sɛ] is a village in the administrative district of Gmina Sztum, within Sztum County, Pomeranian Voivodeship, in northern Poland. It is located in the region of Powiśle.
