= Mangalayatan University =

University in Aligarh, India

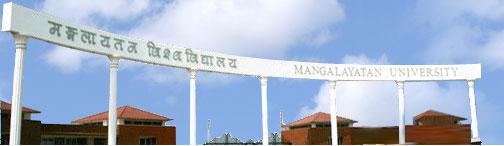
- Other name: MU
- Motto: Learn Today To Lead Tomorrow
- Type: Private
- Established: 2006; 20 years ago
- Founder: Pawan Jain
- Accreditation: NAAC (A+)
- Affiliations: UGC, AICTE, AIU
- Chancellor: Achyutanand Mishra
- Vice-Chancellor: P. K. Dashora
- Academic staff: 245
- Administrative staff: 354
- Students: 10,230+ (2026)
- Location: Beswan, Aligarh, Uttar Pradesh, India
- Campus: Rural
- Colours: Orange and Blue
- Website: Official website

Manglayatan University is a private university established in 2006, recognised by University Grants Commission (UGC). Its campus is located in the city of Aligarh in the Indian state of Uttar Pradesh. The main moto of this university is 'Learn today to lead tomorrow'. It has been accredited by the National Assessment and Accreditation Council (NAAC) with 'A+’ Grade.

== Campuses ==
Mangalayatan University camp is situated at 33rd Milestone, Near Beswan, Aligarh, Uttar Pradesh 202146.

== Academics ==
Mangalayatan University offers a wide range of undergraduate, postgraduate, diploma, and doctoral programs across diverse disciplines. The university is organized into the following academic faculties:

- Faculty of Engineering and Technology
- Faculty of Pharmacy
- Faculty of Business Management and Commerce
- Faculty of Research and Doctoral Studies
- Faculty of Commerce
- Faculty of Nursing
- Faculty of Education
- Faculty of Law and Legal Studies
