= Gmina Sztum =

Gmina Sztum Sztum Commune
- Gmina
- Coat of arms
- Interactive map of Gmina Sztum
- Coordinates (Sztum): 53°55′18″N 19°2′1″E
- Country: Poland
- Voivodeship: Pomeranian
- County: Sztum
- Seat: Sztum

Area
  - Total: 180.84 km^{2} (69.82 sq mi)

Population (2006)
  - Total: 17,873
  - Density: 98.833/km^{2} (255.98/sq mi)
  - Urban: 9,945
  - Rural: 7,928
- Website: http://sztum.pl

Gmina Sztum is an urban-rural gmina (administrative district) in Sztum County, Pomeranian Voivodeship, in northern Poland. Its seat is the town of Sztum, which lies approximately 56 kilometres (35 mi) south-east of the regional capital Gdańsk.

The gmina covers an area of 180.84 square kilometres (69.8 sq mi), and as of 2006 its total population is 17,873 (out of which the population of Sztum amounts to 9,945, and the population of the rural part of the gmina is 7,928).

== Villages ==
Apart from the town of Sztum, Gmina Sztum contains the villages and settlements of Barlewice, Barlewiczki, Biała Góra, Brzezi Ostrów, Cygusy, Czernin, Goraj, Górki, Gościszewo, Gronajny, Grzępa, Kępina, Koniecwałd, Koślinka, Kuliki, Lipka, Michorowo, Nowa Wieś, Nowiny, Parowy, Parpary, Piekło, Pietrzwałd, Polaszki, Postolin, Ramzy Małe, Ramzy Wielkie, Szpitalna Wieś, Sztumska Wieś, Sztumskie Pole, Uśnice, Węgry and Zajezierze.

== Neighbouring gminas ==
Gmina Sztum is bordered by the gminas of Gniew, Malbork, Mikołajki Pomorskie, Miłoradz, Pelplin, Ryjewo and Stary Targ.
