= Piekło, Sztum County =

Piekło
- Village
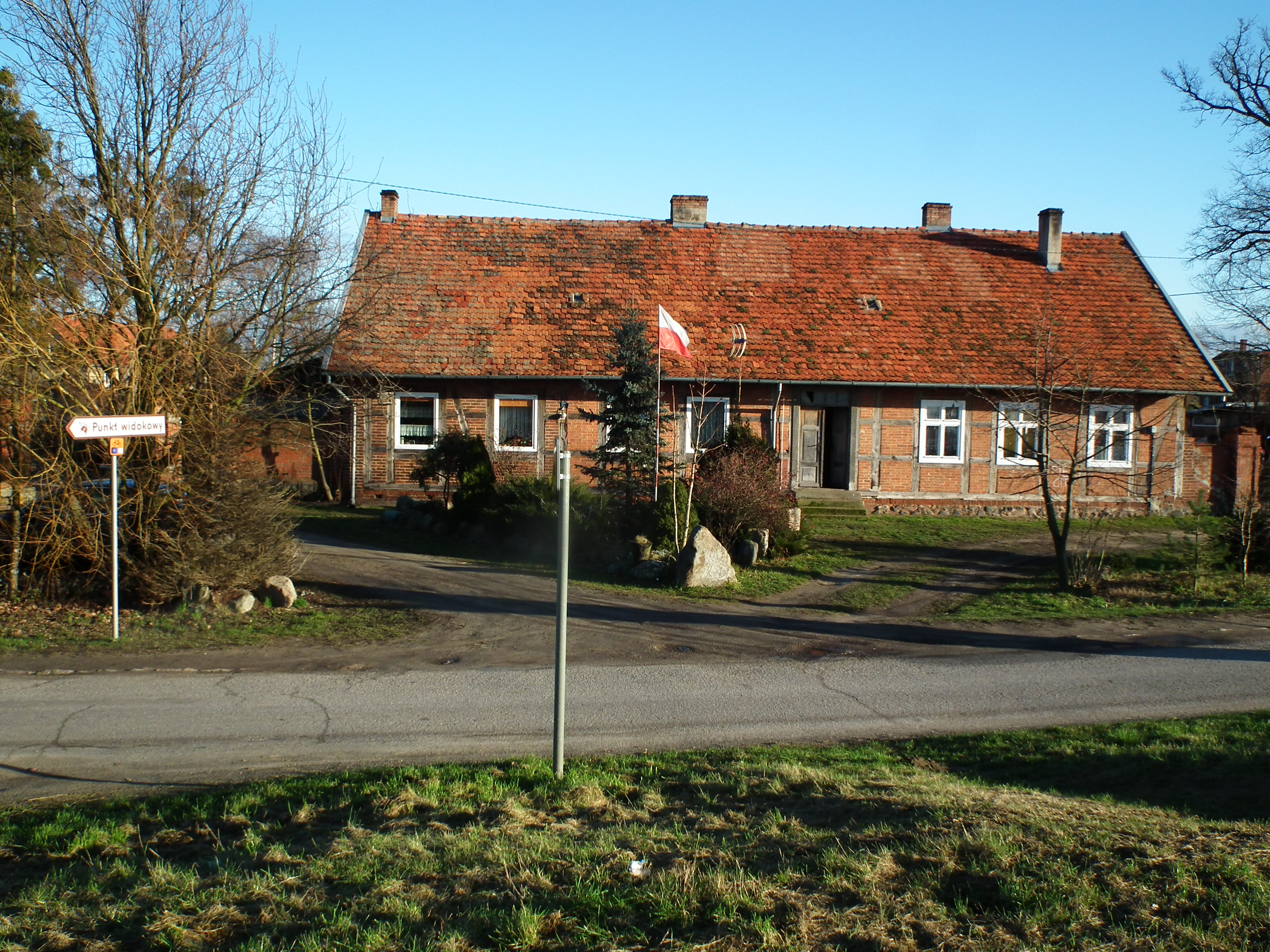

- Location within Poland
- Coordinates: 53°55′55″N 18°51′58″E
- Country: Poland
- Voivodeship: Pomeranian
- County: Sztum
- Gmina: Sztum
- First mentioned: 1570

Population
  - Total: 353
- Time zone: UTC+1 (CET)
  - Summer (DST): UTC+2 (CEST)
- Vehicle registration: GSZ

Piekło [ˈpjɛkwɔ] is a village in the administrative district of Gmina Sztum, within Sztum County, Pomeranian Voivodeship, in northern Poland.

It is situated on the Vistula, in the region of Powiśle.

== History ==
The village was first mentioned in 1570. In 1868, it had a population of 723, including 532 Catholics, 190 Protestants and one Jew, which mainly lived off agriculture and fishing.

In 1937, a Nazi German militia attacked a group of Polish youths returning from singing classes. One of the fathers, Józef Borkowski, stood up in their defense, and was beaten unconscious. Local Polish teacher Jan Hinc was murdered by the Nazis, and is commemorated with a plaque at the local school.

== Cuisine ==
The officially protected traditional foods of Piekło, as designated by the Ministry of Agriculture and Rural Development of Poland are the Piekło marzipan hearts, local cookies, decorated with chocolate or jelly, and the Piekło kiełbasa with black mustard seed, a local type of kiełbasa.
