= Gabhana =

- Nagar Panchayat
- Location in Uttar Pradesh, India Gabhana (India)
- Coordinates: 28.0491896°N 77.9610158°E
- Country: India
- State: Uttar Pradesh
- District: Aligarh

Population (2011)
  - Total: 5,886

Language
  - Official: Hindi
  - Additional official: Urdu
- Time zone: UTC+5:30 (IST)
- PIN: 202136
- Telephone code: 05724
- Vehicle registration: UP-81
- Lok Sabha constituency: Aligarh
- Vidhan Sabha constituency: Gabhana(Barauli)
- Website: ankitsharma6652.github.io/Gabhana

Gabhana is a tehsil, town and a Nagar Panchayat in Aligarh district, 23 km from the district headquarters in the state of Uttar Pradesh, India.

== Geography ==
Gabhana is situated on the Grand Trunk Road 100 km southeast of New Delhi and 80 km from Noida and Ghaziabad, Uttar Pradesh. Neighbouring cities are Khair and Khurja. It is near to Harduaganj Thermal Power Station, one of the oldest hydroelectric power plants of India. This was the Gabhana estate of Jadaun Rajputs, whose descendants migrated here from Karauli State and built the notable Fort Gabhana, a sandstone palace recently renovated quite drastically by the current occupant. The fort is located in the Aligarh district of Uttar Pradesh, India. It was built during the reign of the Raja Surajmal Jadaun in the early 18th century. The fort reflects the architectural style and strategic significance of the era.

== Demographics ==
As of 2011 Indian Census, Gabhana had a total population of 5,886, of which 3,096 were males and 2,790 were females. Population within the age group of 0 to 6 years was 843. The total number of literates in Gabhana was 3,617, which constituted 61.5% of the population with male literacy of 70.3% and female literacy of 51.6%. The effective literacy rate of 7+ population of Gabhana was 71.7%, of which male literacy rate was 81.9% and female literacy rate was 60.4%. The Scheduled Castes and Scheduled Tribes population was 1,875 and 6 respectively. Gabhana had 993 households in 2011.

== Transport ==
Gabhana has a bus stand and a railway station, Somna Railway Station. National Highway NH91 (also known as Gabhana bypass) passes through the town of Gabhana. NH91 Toll Plaza is situated at Somna.
