= Biała Góra, Pomeranian Voivodeship =

Biała Góra
- Village
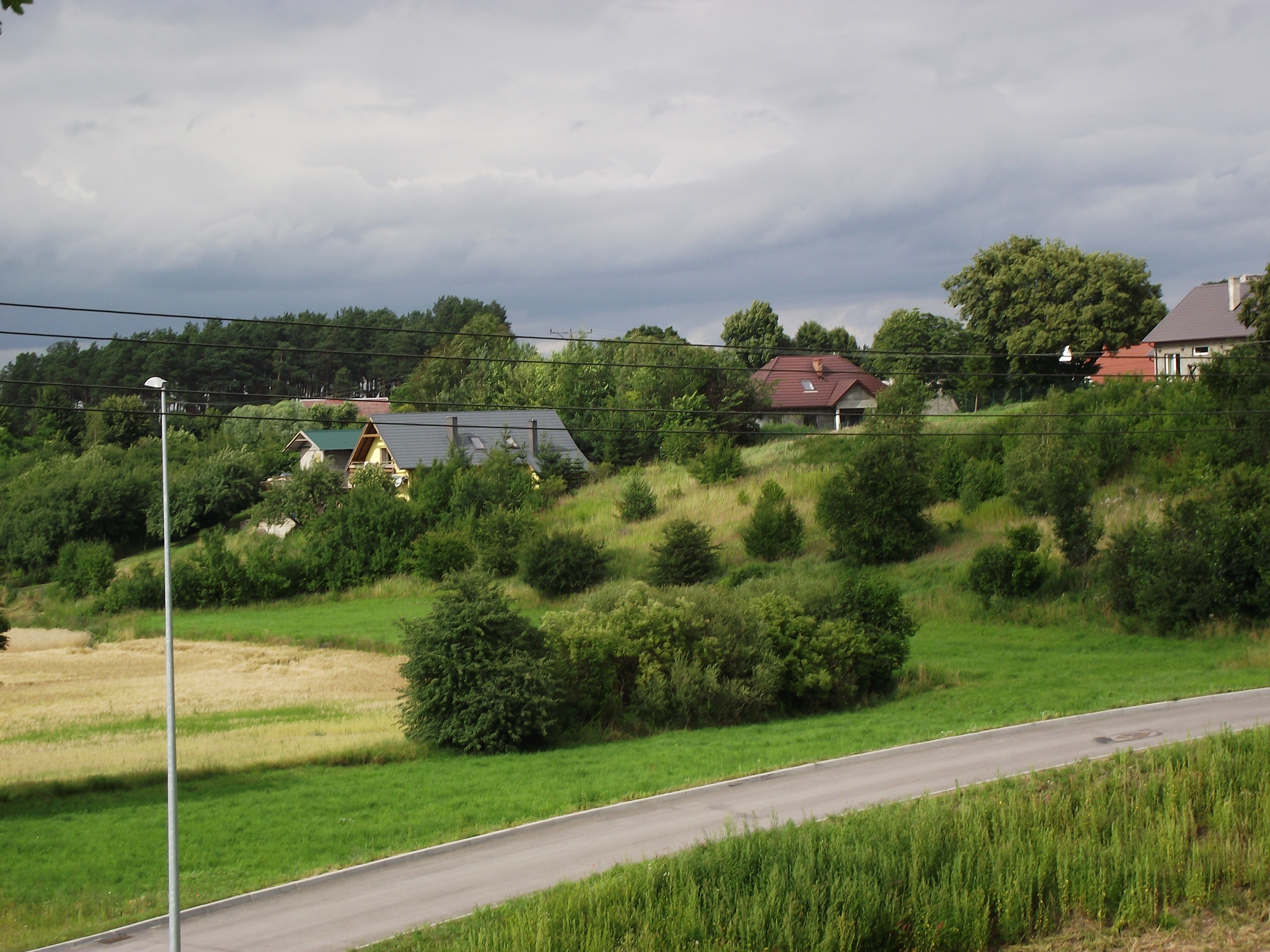

- Location within Poland
- Coordinates: 53°54′52″N 18°53′26″E
- Country: Poland
- Voivodeship: Pomeranian
- County: Sztum
- Gmina: Sztum
- Population: 250
- Time zone: UTC+1 (CET)
  - Summer (DST): UTC+2 (CEST)
- Vehicle registration: GSZ

Biała Góra ([ˈbjawa ˈɡura]) (German: Weißenberg) is a village in the administrative district of Gmina Sztum, within Sztum County, Pomeranian Voivodeship, in northern Poland.
