= Iglas =

- Town
- Location in Uttar Pradesh, India
- Coordinates: 27.72°N 77.93°E
- Country: India
- State: Uttar Pradesh
- District: Aligarh

Government
  - Type: Tehsil
  - Body: Nagar panchayat
  - MLA: Rajkumar Sahyogi (BJP)
  - MP: Rajvir Singh Diller (BJP)
  - Chairman: Smt. Kamlesh Sharma
- Elevation: 178 m (584 ft)

Population (2011)
  - Total: 15,478

Language
  - Official: Hindi
  - Additional: Urdu
  - Additional: Braj Bhasha
- Time zone: UTC+5:30 (IST)
- Postal code: 202124
- Telephone code: 05722
- Vehicle registration: UP 81
- Vidhan Sabha constituency: Iglas
- Lok Sabha constituency: Hathras

Iglas is a town and tehsil in Aligarh district in the Indian state of Uttar Pradesh.

Famous Person Of Iglas-Mahendra Singh

== Geography ==
Iglas is located 24 km from Aligarh along the Aligarh-Mathura Road. It lies at 27.72°N 77.93°E. It has an average elevation of 178 metres (584 feet). The town area extends from Karban River (towards Mathura) to old canal (towards Aligarh). Iglas is 28 km from Khair City and 16 km from Hathras city. It is 14 km from Sasni and 40 km from Mathura city, the birthplace of Lord Krishna.

== Demographics ==
As of 2011 India census, Iglas has a population of 11,861 of which 17% are under 6 years of age. Males constituted 53% of the population and females 47%. The average literacy rate is 95%, which is higher than the national average of 74%. Male literacy is 98% and female literacy 92%.

== Education ==
Iglas is well known place for educational institutions. Students from nearby places come to Iglas for pursuing their education. Iglas as an educational hub offers a wide range of options to students both in regular and professional colleges. The town has institutions offering primary school education to higher education in professional field such as Bachelor of Arts, Bachelor of Science, Master of Arts and Master of Science in different Streams.

== Economy ==
Agriculture is the primary source of income for the locals apart from the services generated by educational institutions. Potato is the main produce of the region and Iglas is one of the main sourcing place for good quality potatoes to various parts of the country. There are over 25 cold storage centers in Iglas for storing agricultural produce.
