= Aligarh district =

District in Uttar Pradesh, India

- District
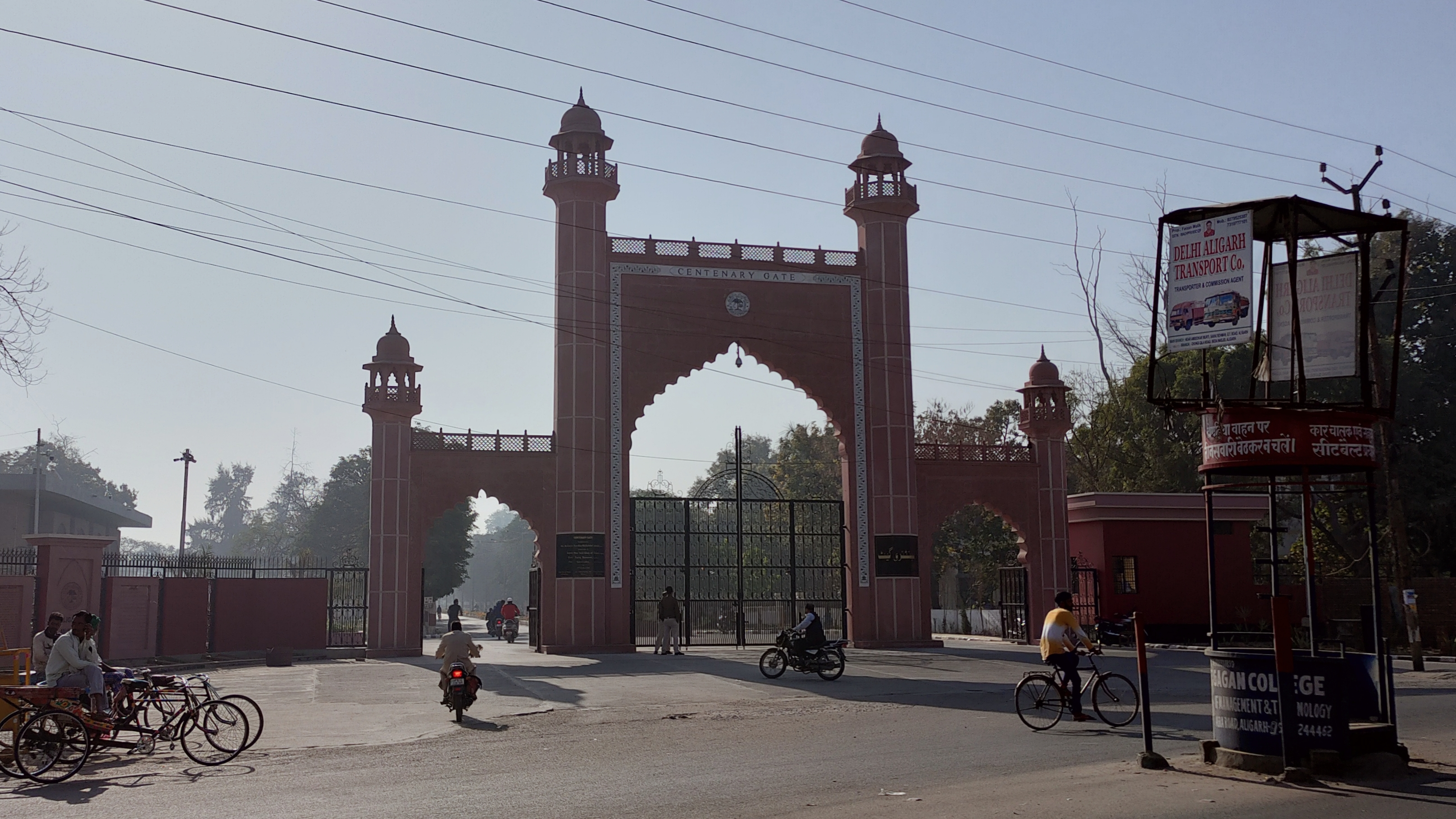
- Centenary Gate, Aligarh Muslim University

- Location of Aligarh district in Uttar Pradesh
- Country: India
- State: Uttar Pradesh
- Division: Aligarh
- Headquarters: Aligarh
- Tehsils: 5

Government
  - Type: Municipal Corporation
  - Body: Aligarh Municipal Corporation
  - Member of Parliament, Lok Sabha: Satish Kumar Gautam, BJP
  - Lok Sabha constituency: Aligarh

Area
  - Total: 3,788 km^{2} (1,463 sq mi)

Population (2011)
  - Total: 3,673,889
- Demonym: Aligarian

Language
  - Official: Hindi
  - Additional official: Urdu
  - Regional: Braj

Demographics
  - Literacy: 69.61%
  - Sex ratio: 894
- Time zone: UTC+5:30 (IST)
- PIN: 202001, 202002
- Telephone code: 0571
- Vehicle registration: UP-81
- Major highways: NH91
- Website: Official Website

Aligarh district (Hindi pronunciation: [əliːgəɽʱ]) is one of the 75 districts in the northern Indian state of Uttar Pradesh. This district is a part of Aligarh division. The district headquarters is Aligarh. The districts which adjoin Aligarh are (clockwise from north) Gautam Buddha Nagar, Bulandshahr, Sambhal, Badaun, Kasganj, Hathras and Mathura of Uttar Pradesh and Palwal district of Haryana.

== Demographics ==
Historical population
Year	Pop.	±% p.a.
1901	869,799	—
1911	844,344	−0.30%
1921	769,060	−0.93%
1931	848,737	+0.99%
1941	994,253	+1.60%
1951	1,118,017	+1.18%
1961	1,278,945	+1.35%
1971	1,541,536	+1.88%
1981	1,884,955	+2.03%
1991	2,449,597	+2.65%
2001	2,992,286	+2.02%
2011	3,673,889	+2.07%

Religions in Aligarh district (2011)
Religion	Percent
Hinduism	79.05%
Islam	19.85%
Other or not stated	1.10%
Distribution of religions

According to the 2011 census, Aligarh district has a population of 3,673,889, roughly equal to the nation of Mauritania or the US state of Oklahoma. This gives the district a ranking of 76th in India (out of a total of 640 districts). The district has a population density of 100 inhabitants per square kilometre (260/sq mi). Its population growth rate over the 2001-2011 decade was 22.78%. Aligarh has a sex ratio of 876 females for every 1,000 males, and a literacy rate of 69.61%. 33.13% of the population lived in urban areas. Scheduled Castes make up 20.56% of the population.

Languages of Aligarh district (2011)
1. Hindi (92.5%)
2. Urdu (5.34%)
3. Braj Bhasha (1.90%)
4. Others (0.22%)

At the time of the 2011 census of India, 92.54% of the population in the district spoke Hindi, 5.34% Urdu and 1.90% Braj bhasha as their first language. The local language is Braj bhasha.

== Tehsils ==
In 1941 to 1991 Census Aligarh District Includes the following tehsils

- Aligarh
- Khair
- Atrauli
- Hathras
- Sikandra Rao
- Iglas

Following Creation of Hathras District in 1997 Hathras, Sikandra Rao, Iglas. Later Iglas was again returned to Aligarh District.

- Koil Aligarh
- Khair
- Atrauli
- Iglas
- Gabhana

== Blocks ==
1. Block-Gonda
2. Block-Atrauli
3. Block-Tappal
4. Gangiri
5. Bijauli
6. Block-Dhanipur
7. Block-Iglas
8. Block-Jawan Sikandarpur
9. Block-Lodhaa
10. Block-Chandous
11. Block-Khair
12. अकराबाद, कोइल (अलीगढ़)
13. Block-Gabhana

== Education in Aligarh ==
- Aligarh Muslim University is the centre of higher education in Aligarh. With around 30,000 students, the university offers more than 250 courses in both traditional and modern fields of education. In addition, there are many decent schools and colleges for primary and secondary level education.
- Raja Mahendra Pratap Singh State University Aligarh
- Mangalayatan University, (Private University)
- Dharam Samaj Post Graduation College (D.S College), a co-ed college formerly affiliated to Dr. Bhimrao Ambedkar University (Agra University). Now affiliated to Raja Mahendra Pratap University, Aligarh
- Shri Varshney College (S.V College), a co-ed college formerly affiliated to Dr. Bhimrao Ambedkar University (Agra University). Now affiliated to Raja Mahendra Pratap University, Aligarh
- Shri Tikaram Girls College (T.R College), an all girls college formerly affiliated to Dr. Bhimrao Ambedkar University (Agra University). Now affiliated to Raja Mahendra Pratap University, Aligarh

== Cities in Aligarh district ==
- Aligarh
- Khair
- Atrauli

== Villages ==
- Ogipur
- Malahpur

== Nearby Districts ==
- Hathras district
- Mathura district
- Bulandshahr district
- Sambhal district
- Gautam Buddha Nagar district (Noida)
- Kasganj district
- Budaun district
- Palwal district
- Etah district

== See also ==
- List of districts of Uttar Pradesh
- Administrative divisions of Uttar Pradesh
