= Nowa Karczma =

Nowa Karczma may refer to the following places in Poland:

- Nowa Karczma, Lower Silesian Voivodeship (south-west Poland)
- Nowa Karczma, Chojnice County in Pomeranian Voivodeship (north Poland)
- Nowa Karczma, Gmina Kościerzyna in Pomeranian Voivodeship (north Poland)
- Nowa Karczma, Gmina Nowa Karczma in Pomeranian Voivodeship (north Poland)
- Nowa Karczma, Sztum County in Pomeranian Voivodeship (north Poland)
- Nowa Karczma, Wejherowo County in Pomeranian Voivodeship (north Poland)
- Nowa Karczma, Warmian-Masurian Voivodeship (north Poland)
- Nowa Karczma, Krynica Morska in Pomeranian Voivodeship (north Poland)
