= Pustkowie =

Pustkowie may refer to the following places:

- Pustkowie, Lubusz Voivodeship (west Poland)
- Pustkowie, Gliwice County in Silesian Voivodeship (south Poland)
- Pustkowie, Lubliniec County in Silesian Voivodeship (south Poland)
- Pustkowie, Chojnice County in Pomeranian Voivodeship (north Poland)
- Pustkowie, Starogard County in Pomeranian Voivodeship (north Poland)
- Pustkowie, West Pomeranian Voivodeship (north-west Poland)
