= Czersko Polskie roller dam, Bydgoszcz =

Dam on the Brda river, Bydgoszcz, Poland

Coordinates: 53°06′40″N 18°07′13″E

Roller dam on the Brda river
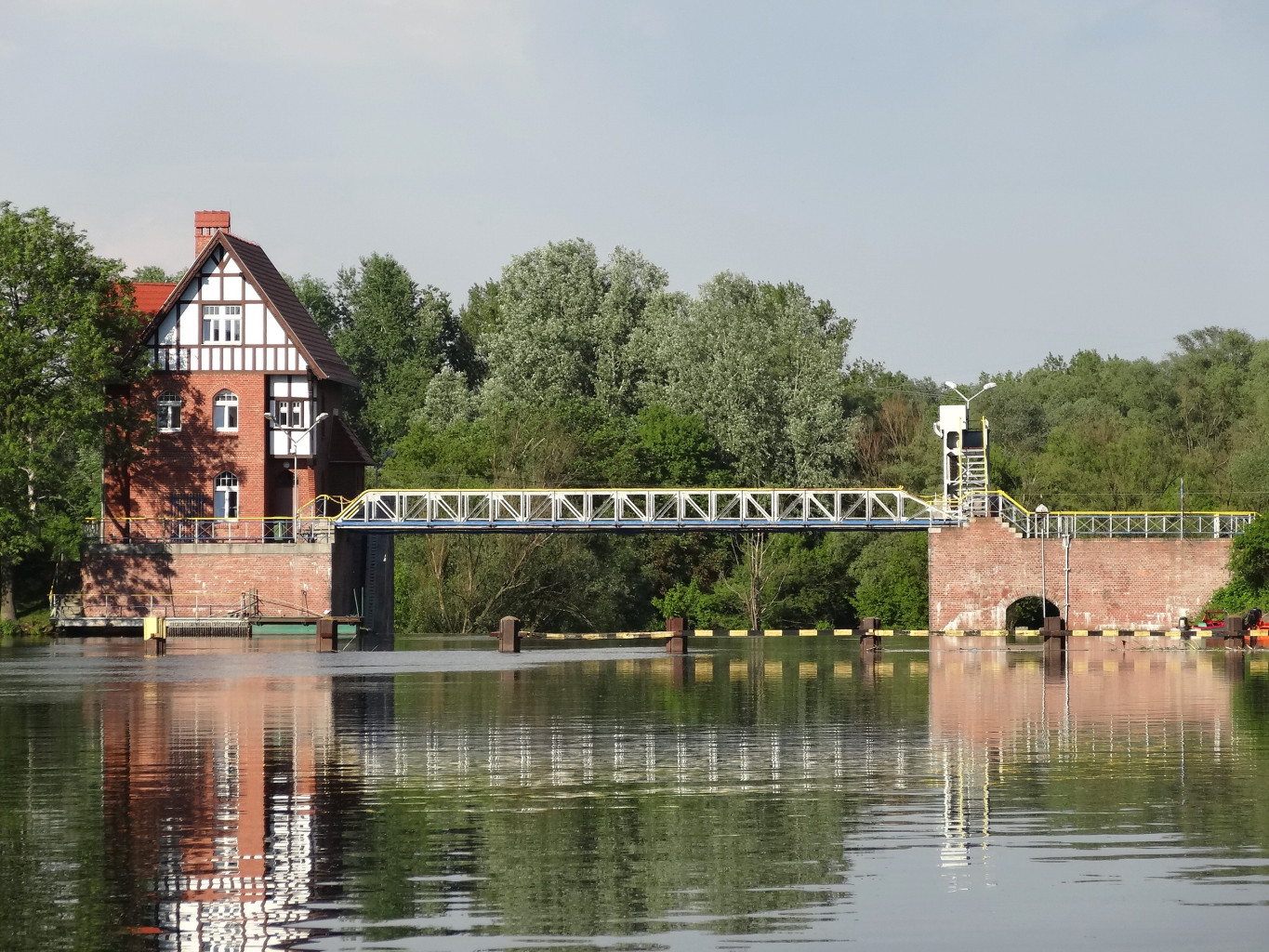
- Roller dam on the Brda river
- Interactive map of Roller dam on the Brda river
- Official name: Jaz Czersko Polskie
- Country: Poland
- Location: Bydgoszcz
- Construction began: 1906
- Operator: MEWAT Sp. z o.o.
- Registered on the Kuyavian-Pomeranian Voivodeship Heritage List Nr.PL.1.9.ZIPOZ.NID_E_04_BL.29939

The Jaz Czersko Polskie is a roller dam located in the area of the mouth of the Brda river to the Vistula river in Bydgoszcz. Belonging to the district of Czersko Polskie, it is the initial stage of the 294.3 kilometres (182.9 mi) long inland navigation route Vistula-Oder waterway, connecting the rivers Vistula and Oder.

It is the oldest roller dam in Poland. This unique Polish hydrotechnical construction has been maintained in an operative order since the beginning of the 20th century.

== Location ==
The dam is located at 157b Toruńska Street at the junction of several districts of Bydgoszcz: Brdyujście, Łęgnowo, Zimne Wody and Czersko Polskie. The facility closes the southeast of the Regatta course area on the Brda river, at a distance of 2.8 kilometres (1.7 mi) from the start of Vistula-Oder Waterway.

It is the southernmost facility of the Czersko Polskie water stage.

== History ==
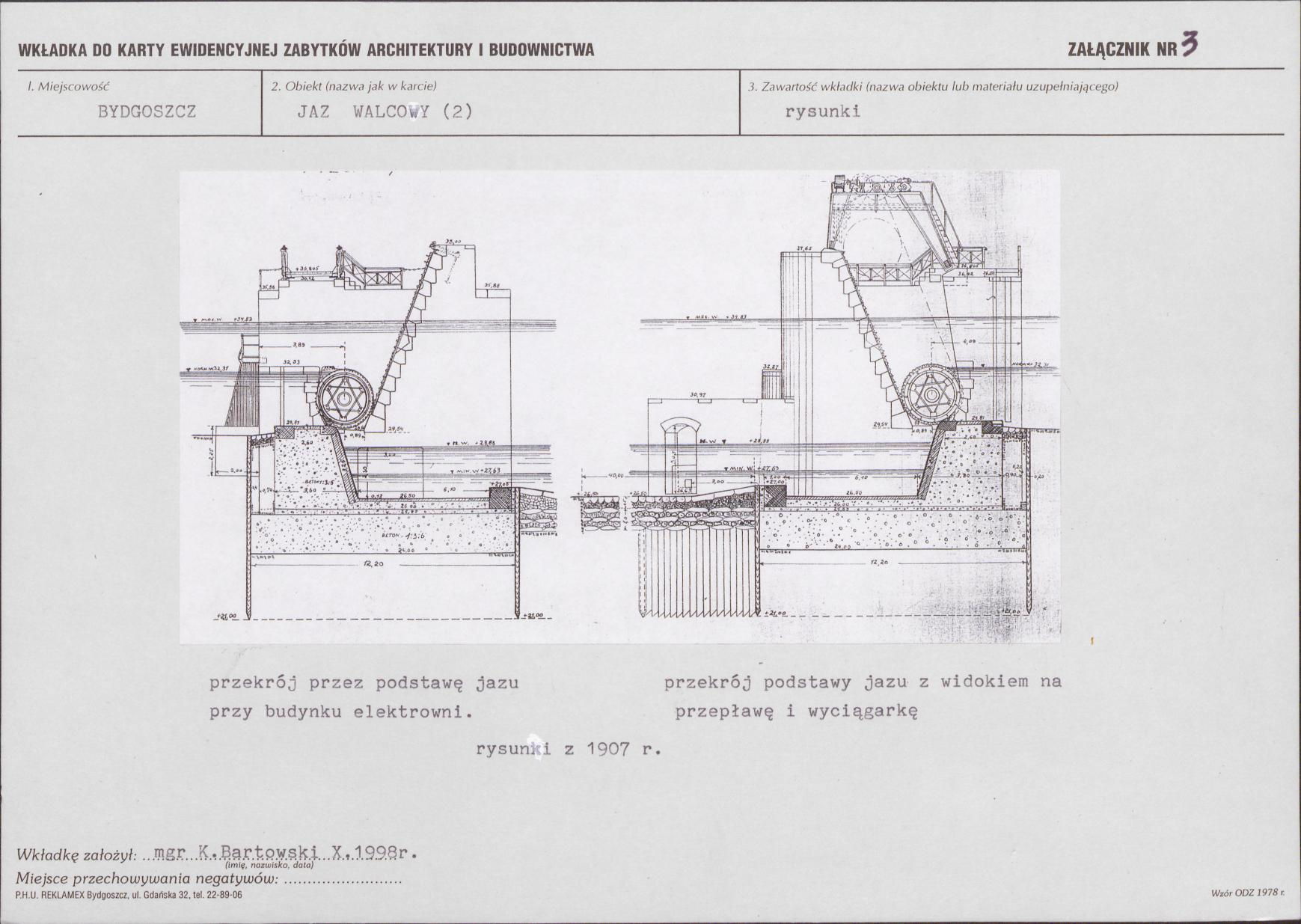
Roller weir plans ca 1907

The first works aiming at canalizing the Brda river section within Bydgoszcz were performed between 1877 and 1879. The results of this works were the construction of:

- the Brdyujście water lock;
- two needle weirs in Czersk Polski district;
- a Kapuściska pass located at six kilometer upstream on the Brda river. This stage was razed in 1904-1907 when a modernization of the Bydgoszcz water junction was carried out.

A cylindrical weir was erected so as to replace the then-existing 50 cm high needle weir: although the steel elements of the previous weir had been dismantled, its granite abutments have survived to this day, more than a meter under water. At the time, the renovation was financed by the city of Bromberg (66%) and the Prussian government (34%): the overall project, including the weir and the power plant on its left abutment, amounted to 1.2 million marks.

The main reason for this modernization plan was the need to enlarge the city Wood harbour facing the increasing waterway flow of timber coming from Małopolska and the Russian-controlled Congress Poland towards the German Empire via the Vistula-Oder water network. As such, after completion of the project in 1906, half of the entire Prussian import of timber (5 million m³) transited through the Brdyujście lock.

In the late 20th century (1994–1997) the weir was expanded with the following:

- a three-span reinforced concrete lateral spillway;
- a second hydroelectric power plant equipped with 4 Kaplan turbines hydro sets, located on the side of the new spillway.

In 2005, the cylindrical weir was renovated in order to restore its operating capacity (e.g. changing hoisting mechanisms and other devices).

In 2024, the Regional Water Management Board decided to fund a replacement of the hydroelectric power plant located in the weir building by a modern and more powerful (125-150 kW) one. Works will be completed in September 2026.

=== Operators ===
Since 2014, the Czersko Polskie roller dam is managed by the Regional Water Management Board (Polish: Regionalny Zarząd Gospodarki Wodnej in Gdańsk and the Kujawy Vistula Catchment Board (Polish: Zarząd Zlewni Wisły Kujawskiej in Toruń.

The premises are operated locally by the Bydgoszcz Water Supervision Board (Polish: Zarząd Nadzór Wodny w Bydgoszczy), which has its seat in the vicinity of the Czersko Polskie lock.

The administrator of the side spillway and the detached hydroelectric power plant on the right bank is the company "MEWAT".

== Function ==
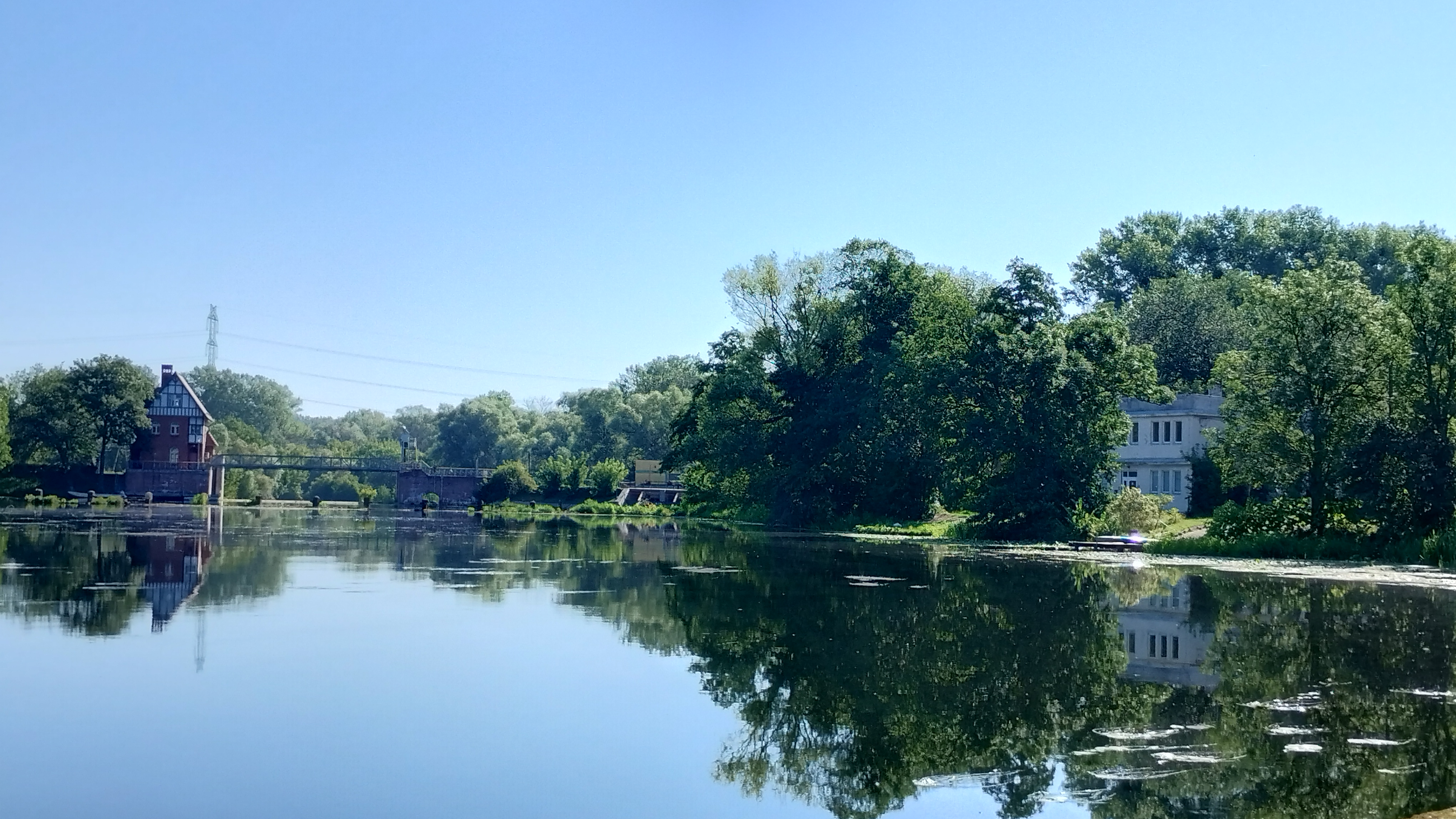
The weir and the hydroelectric power plant (building on the right)

The purposes of the weir are as follows:

- allow the waters of the Brda river to pass through;
- minimize the fluctuations of the river water surface;
- dam the river without hampering the needs of navigation at the Czersko Polskie stage.
- allow uninterrupted operation of water intakes and storm sewer outlets;
- stabilize groundwater and drainage of areas adjacent to the river.

The 3.76 metres (12.3 ft) high dam on the weir guarantees navigability on the Brda between the locks in Bydgoszcz city (located at Marcinkowskiego Street) and Czersko Polskie.

Since 1997, the Bydgoszcz company MEWAT had been operating a hydroelectric power plant on the opposite side of the weir.

== Construction ==
The weir has been built as a 22 metres (72 ft)-wide single-span concrete structure. The dam is made of a steel cylinder with a diameter of 2.5 metres (8.2 ft). It is raised/lowered by a hoisting mechanism placed on the right abutment of the weir, on a steel platform. The mechanism is powered electrically (with a 17 kW engine) or manually in case of emergency by means of a Galle chain moving along toothed tracks mounted in the abutment. The cylinder is sealed by an oak beam mounted in a socket.

An operational platform has been built in a shape of a 24.90 metres (81.7 ft)-long bridge with a steel structure.

The maximum elevation of the sill is 29.72 metres (97.5 ft). The weir maximum capacity is 115–176 m³/s, depending on the degree inclination of the sill flooding.

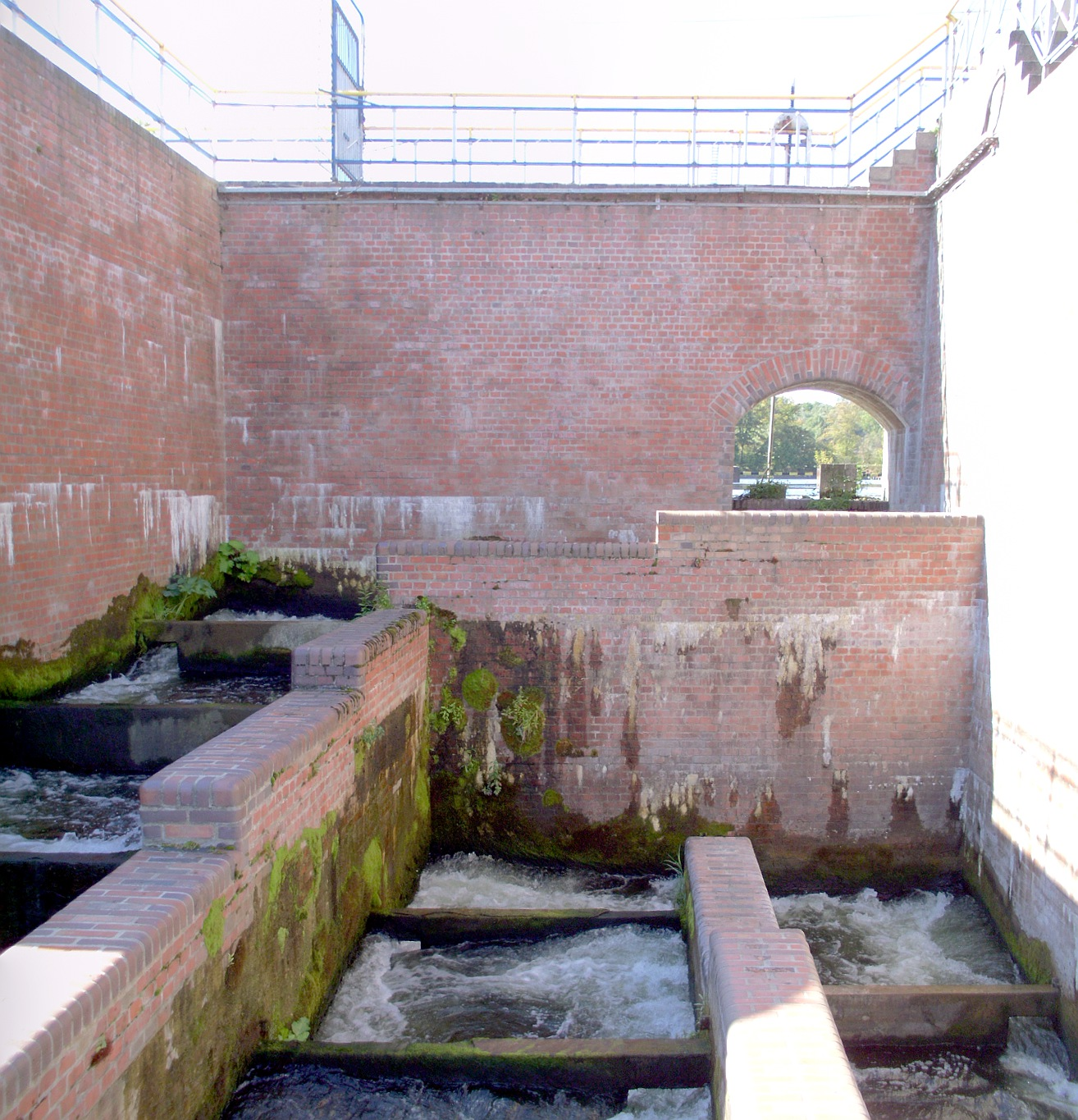
Fish ladder

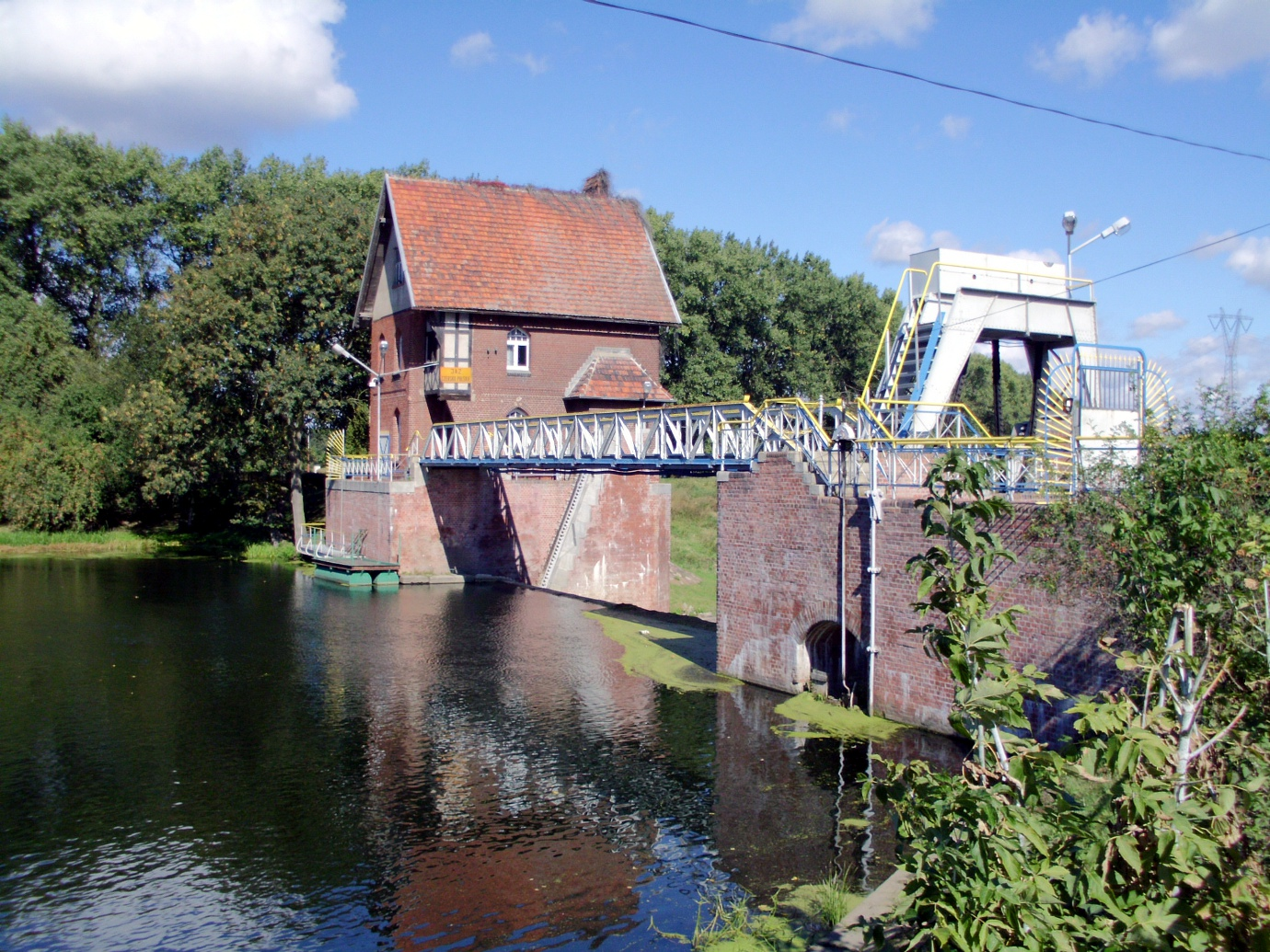
View of the historic building

== Distinctive elements ==
In addition to the weir, the following components at present on the site:

- a fish ladder on the right buttress of the weir, built in 1999;
- a 100 kW hydroelectric power plant in the weir's engine room on the left bank, with a maximum flow rate of 3.5m^{³}/s;
- a 36 kW hydroelectric power plant on the right bank of the weir, managed by the company MEWAT with a maximum flow rate of 30m^{³}/s.

The main power plant is topped by a historic, two-storey brick building, which used to house -at the beginning of the 20th century- a machine room with a generator, a switchboard and a battery room. It operated till the 1960s.

== Architecture ==
The overall architecture of the roller dam ensemble displays historicism character from the end of the 19th century. The main aesthetic features of this design aim at inscribing the hydrotechnical structure into the natural landscape of the Brda river.

In 2005, the weir ensemble was entered into the register of the Kuyavian-Pomeranian Voivodeship Heritage List, under the number PL.1.9.ZIPOZ.NID E 04 BL.29939.

== See also ==
- Bydgoszcz
- Roller dam
- Żegluga Bydgoska

== Bibliography ==
- Umiński, Janusz (1996). Bydgoszcz. Przewodnik [Bydgoszcz. Guide] (in Polish). Bydgoszcz: Regionalny Oddział PTTK "Szlak Brdy".
