= Kiełpin =

Kiełpin may refer to the following places:

- Kiełpin, Greater Poland Voivodeship (west-central Poland)
- Kiełpin, Kuyavian-Pomeranian Voivodeship (north-central Poland)
- Kiełpin, Masovian Voivodeship (east-central Poland)
- Kiełpin, Gorzów County in Lubusz Voivodeship (west Poland)
- Kiełpin, Zielona Góra County in Lubusz Voivodeship (west Poland)
- Kiełpin, Chojnice County in Pomeranian Voivodeship (north Poland)
- Kiełpin, Człuchów County in Pomeranian Voivodeship (north Poland)
- Kiełpin, West Pomeranian Voivodeship (north-west Poland)
