= Jasna =

Jasna may refer to:

== Places ==
- Jasna, Pomeranian Voivodeship, a village in Poland
- Jasná, a village and ski resort in Slovakia
- Lake Jasna, a pair of artificial lakes in Upper Carniola, Slovenia
- Jasna Góra, a monastery and a place of pilgrimage in Częstochowa, Poland

== Other uses ==
- Jasna (given name), a Slavic female given name
- JASNA, the Jane Austen Society of North America

== See also ==
- Yasna, a concept in Zoroastrianism
