= Juditten =

Juditten refers to:

- Juditten, the German name of Mendeleyevo, Kaliningrad, Kaliningrad Oblast, Russia
  - Juditten Church, the oldest church of Sambia
- Juditten, the German name of Judyty, Warmian-Masurian Voivodeship, Poland
- Judittenhof, the German name of Judyty, Pomeranian Voivodeship, Poland
