= Johann von Posilge =

Prussian chronicler (c. 1340 – 1405)

Johann von Posilge (c. 1340 – 1405) was a parish priest of Deutsch Eylau (Iława) and later assistant to Bishop of Pomesania. He is better known as the author of Chronik des Landes Preussen, a chronicle detailing events in Prussia from around 1360. It is one of the most important sources on the history of the Teutonic Knights for the period. After his death, the chronicle was translated from Latin to German continued to 1420. Posilge was not a German, but a native Prussian, born in the village of Posilge (Żuławka Sztumska), east of Marienburg (Malbork). As such, he was more critical of the Knights and deviated from traditional overly panegyric chronicles of the time.
