= Piaski Sztumskie =

- Village
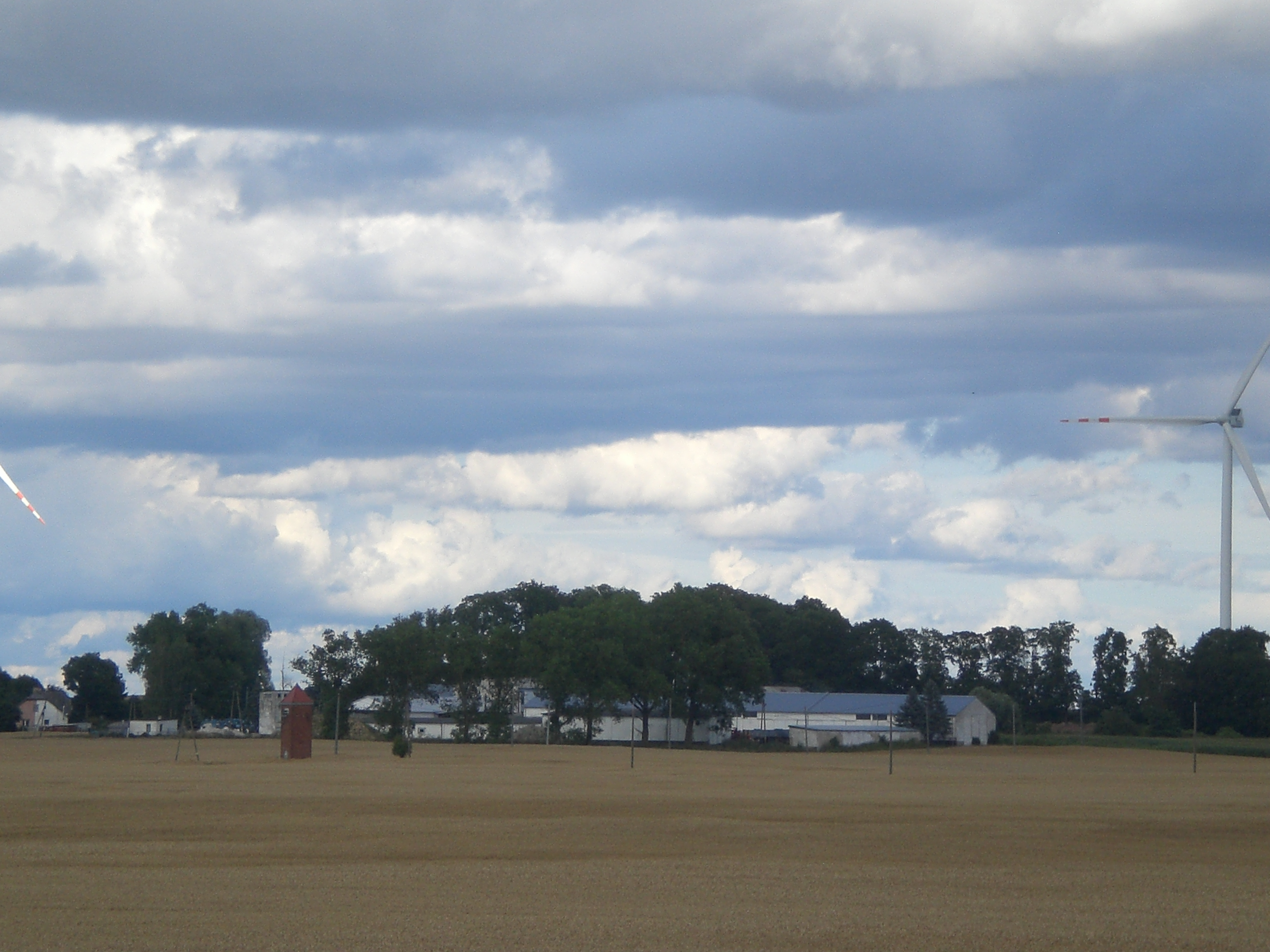

- Location within Poland
- Coordinates: 53°58′08″N 19°18′54″E
- Country: Poland
- Voivodeship: Pomeranian
- County: Sztum
- Gmina: Dzierzgoń

Piaski Sztumskie (Polish pronunciation: [ˈpjaskʲi ˈʂtumskʲɛ]) is a village in the administrative district of Gmina Dzierzgoń, within Sztum County, Pomeranian Voivodeship, in northern Poland.

For the history of the region, see History of Pomerania.
