= Brda (river) =

River in northwestern Poland

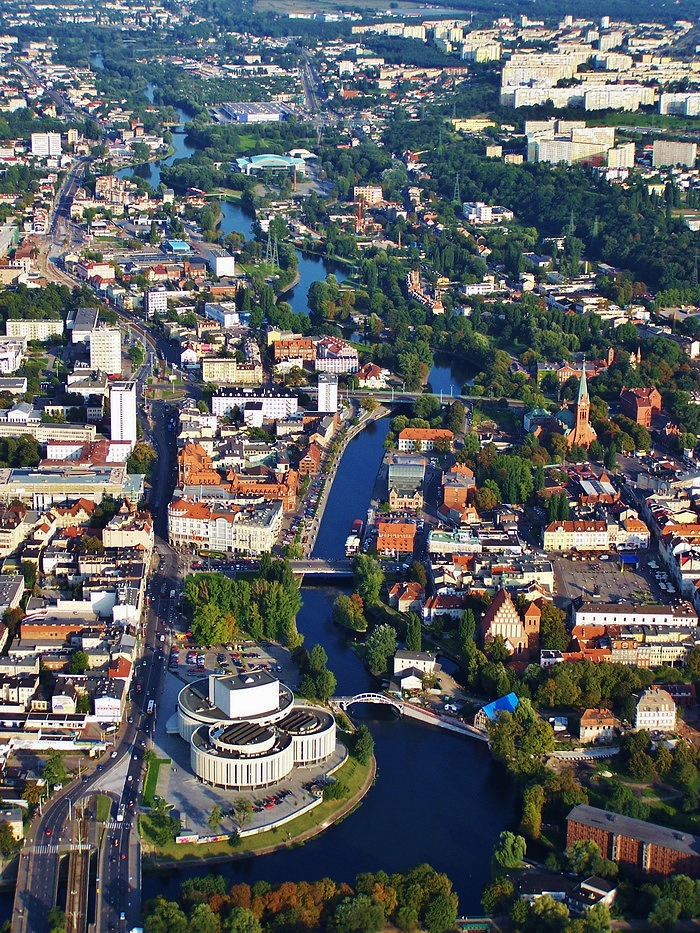
- Brda flowing through Bydgoszcz

- Location of the mouth in Poland

Location
- Country: Poland
- Voivodeship: Pomeranian; Kuyavian-Pomeranian

Physical characteristics
- Source
  - location: Lake Smołowe
  - coordinates: 54°1′57″N 17°4′41″E
- Mouth
  - location: Vistula
  - coordinates: 53°7′37″N 18°8′3″E
- Length: 245 km (152 mi)
- Basin size: 4,665 km^{2} (1,801 sq mi)
- Discharge
  - average: 28.0 m^{3}/s (990 cu ft/s)

Basin features
- Progression: Vistula→ Baltic Sea

The Brda (Polish: [brda]; German: Brahe) is a river in northern Poland. A tributary of the Vistula River, the Brda has a total length of 245 km and a catchment area of 4,665 km^{2}, all within Poland.

== Navigation ==
The Brda is part of the Odra-Vistula waterway, connecting these two rivers via the Warta and Noteć rivers and the Bydgoszcz Canal since the end of the 18th century. The waterway is navigable for modest barges (of CEMT Class II) but with a limited draught.

With the expansion of the European Union to the East, the waterway could play an important role. It is a link in the much longer connection with Eastern Europe via the Vistula, Narew, Bug, Mukhavets, Pripyat, and Dnieper rivers, but this connection remains unnavigable due to a dam near Brest, Belarus.

Currently, only limited numbers of vessels use the Brda River and the adjacent canal (however, the traffic was significantly larger from 1950s to 1970s, then diminishing gradually). It is expected that the waterway will be discovered by leisure boaters in the future. (Source: NoorderSoft Waterways Database)

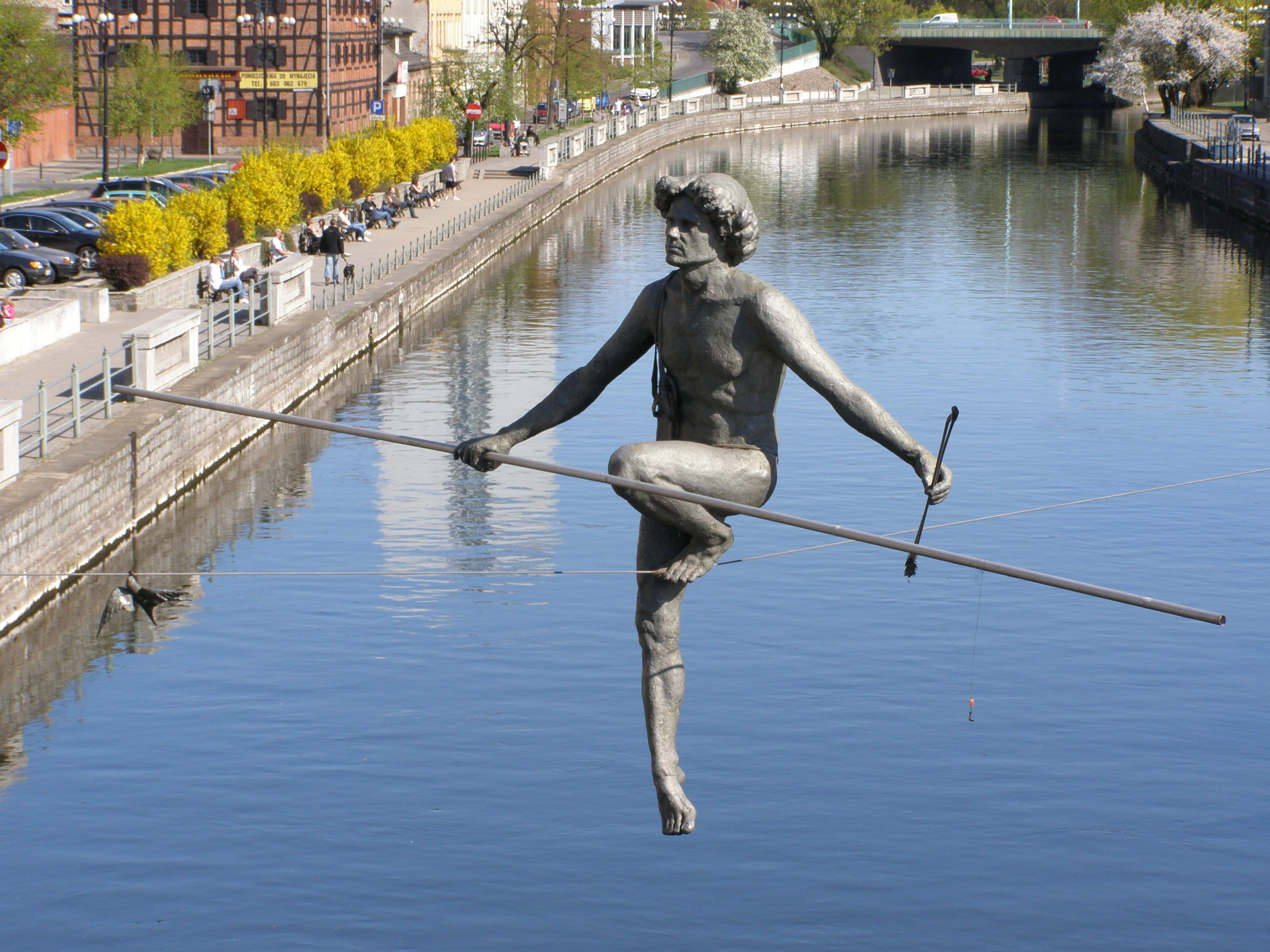
View from the Jerzy Sulima-Kamiński Bridge, Old Town, Bydgoszcz

Man Crossing the River (Polish: Przechodzący przez rzekę), a balancing sculpture across the Brda River in Bydgoszcz, was unveiled in 2004.

== Tourism ==
The Brda is one of the most beautiful kayak routes in Poland. The trail is 233 km long, and goes through forests, lakes and fields.

== Towns and townships on Brda ==
- Przechlewo
- Konarzyny
- Tuchola
- Koronowo
- Bydgoszcz

== See also ==
- List of rivers of Poland
