= Korne, Chojnice County =

Korne
- Settlement
- Location within Poland
- Coordinates: 53°49′13″N 17°22′7″E
- Country: Poland
- Voivodeship: Pomeranian
- County: Chojnice
- Gmina: Konarzyny
- Population: 79

Korne [ˈkɔrnɛ] is a settlement in the administrative district of Gmina Konarzyny, within Chojnice County, Pomeranian Voivodeship, in northern Poland.

For details of the history of the region, see History of Pomerania.
