= Pachoły =

- Village
- Location within Poland
- Coordinates: 53°55′48″N 19°22′48″E
- Country: Poland
- Voivodeship: Pomeranian
- County: Sztum
- Gmina: Dzierzgoń

Pachoły [paˈxɔwɨ] is a village in the administrative district of Gmina Dzierzgoń, within Sztum County, Pomeranian Voivodeship, in northern Poland.

For the history of the region, see History of Pomerania.
