= Jonki =

Jonki Jónczi
- Village
- A residency in the village

- Location within Poland
- Coordinates: 53°52′42″N 17°25′25″E
- Country: Poland
- Voivodeship: Pomeranian
- County: Chojnice
- Gmina: Konarzyny
- Population: 41

Jonki [ˈjɔnki] (Kashubian: Jónczi) is a village in the administrative district of Gmina Konarzyny, within Chojnice County, Pomeranian Voivodeship, in northern Poland.

For details of the history of the region, see History of Pomerania.

During the years of 1975–1998, Jonki belonged to the Słupsk Voivodeship.
