= Bągart, Pomeranian Voivodeship =

Bągart
- Village
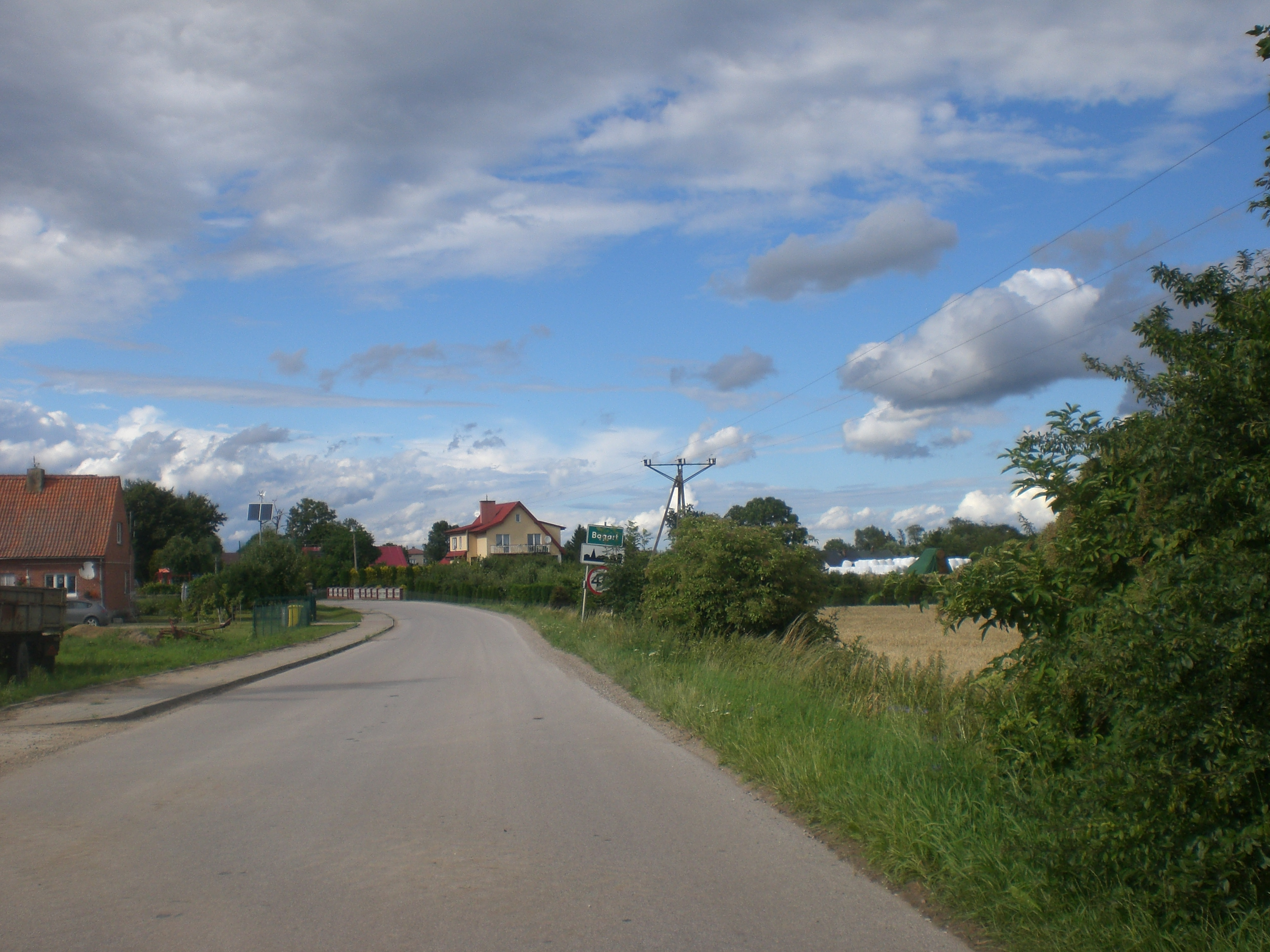

- Location within Poland
- Coordinates: 53°57′59″N 19°21′28″E
- Country: Poland
- Voivodeship: Pomeranian
- County: Sztum
- Gmina: Dzierzgoń
- Population: 420

Bągart [ˈbɔnɡart] is a village in the administrative district of Gmina Dzierzgoń, within Sztum County, Pomeranian Voivodeship, in northern Poland.

For the history of the region, see History of Pomerania.
