= Gmina Dzierzgoń =

Gmina Dzierzgoń Dzierzgoń Commune
- Gmina
- Coat of arms
- Interactive map of Gmina Dzierzgoń
- Coordinates (Dzierzgoń): 53°55′24″N 19°21′5″E
- Country: Poland
- Voivodeship: Pomeranian
- County: Sztum
- Seat: Dzierzgoń

Area
  - Total: 131.4 km^{2} (50.7 sq mi)

Population (2006)
  - Total: 9,533
  - Density: 72.55/km^{2} (187.9/sq mi)
  - Urban: 5,630
  - Rural: 3,903
- Website: http://www.dzierzgon.pl

Gmina Dzierzgoń is an urban-rural gmina (administrative district) in Sztum County, Pomeranian Voivodeship, in northern Poland. Its seat is the town of Dzierzgoń, which lies approximately 21 kilometres (13 mi) east of Sztum and 68 km (42 mi) south-east of the regional capital Gdańsk.

The gmina covers an area of 131.4 square kilometres (50.7 sq mi), and as of 2006 its total population is 9,533 (out of which the population of Dzierzgoń amounts to 5,630, and the population of the rural part of the gmina is 3,903).

== Villages ==
Apart from the town of Dzierzgoń, Gmina Dzierzgoń contains the villages and settlements of Ankamaty, Bągart, Blunaki, Bruk, Budzisz, Chartowo, Chojty, Jasna, Jeziorno, Judyty, Kamienna Góra, Kuksy, Lisi Las, Litewki, Minięta, Morany, Nowa Karczma, Nowiec, Nowiny, Pachoły, Pawłowo, Piaski Sztumskie, Poliksy, Prakwice, Spalonki, Stanówko, Stanowo, Stara Wieś, Tywęzy and Żuławka Sztumska.

== Neighbouring gminas ==
Gmina Dzierzgoń is bordered by the gminas of Markusy, Mikołajki Pomorskie, Rychliki, Stare Pole, Stary Dzierzgoń and Stary Targ.
