= Boryń, Pomeranian Voivodeship =

Boryń Bòrëń
- Hamlet
- Location within Poland
- Coordinates: 53°54′40″N 17°25′38″E
- Country: Poland
- Voivodeship: Pomeranian
- County: Chojnice
- Gmina: Konarzyny
- Population: 6

Boryń [ˈbɔrɨɲ] (Kashubian: Bòrëń) is a hamlet in the administrative district of Gmina Konarzyny, within Chojnice County, Pomeranian Voivodeship, in northern Poland.

For details of the history of the region, see History of Pomerania.
