= Ankamaty =

- Village
- Location within Poland
- Coordinates: 53°55′42″N 19°16′53″E
- Country: Poland
- Voivodeship: Pomeranian
- County: Sztum
- Gmina: Dzierzgoń
- Population: 80

Ankamaty [ankaˈmatɨ] is a village in the administrative district of Gmina Dzierzgoń, within Sztum County, Pomeranian Voivodeship, in northern Poland.

Before 1772 the area was part of Kingdom of Poland, 1772-1945 Prussia and Germany. For the history of the region, see History of Pomerania.
