= Pawłowo, Sztum County =

Village in Pomeranian Voivodeship, Poland

Pawłowo
- Village
- Location within Poland
- Coordinates: 53°57′42″N 19°18′17″E
- Country: Poland
- Voivodeship: Pomeranian
- County: Sztum
- Gmina: Dzierzgoń

Pawłowo [paˈvwɔvɔ] is a village in the administrative district of Gmina Dzierzgoń, within Sztum County, Pomeranian Voivodeship, in northern Poland.

For the history of the region, see History of Pomerania.
