= Bruk, Pomeranian Voivodeship =

Bruk
- Village
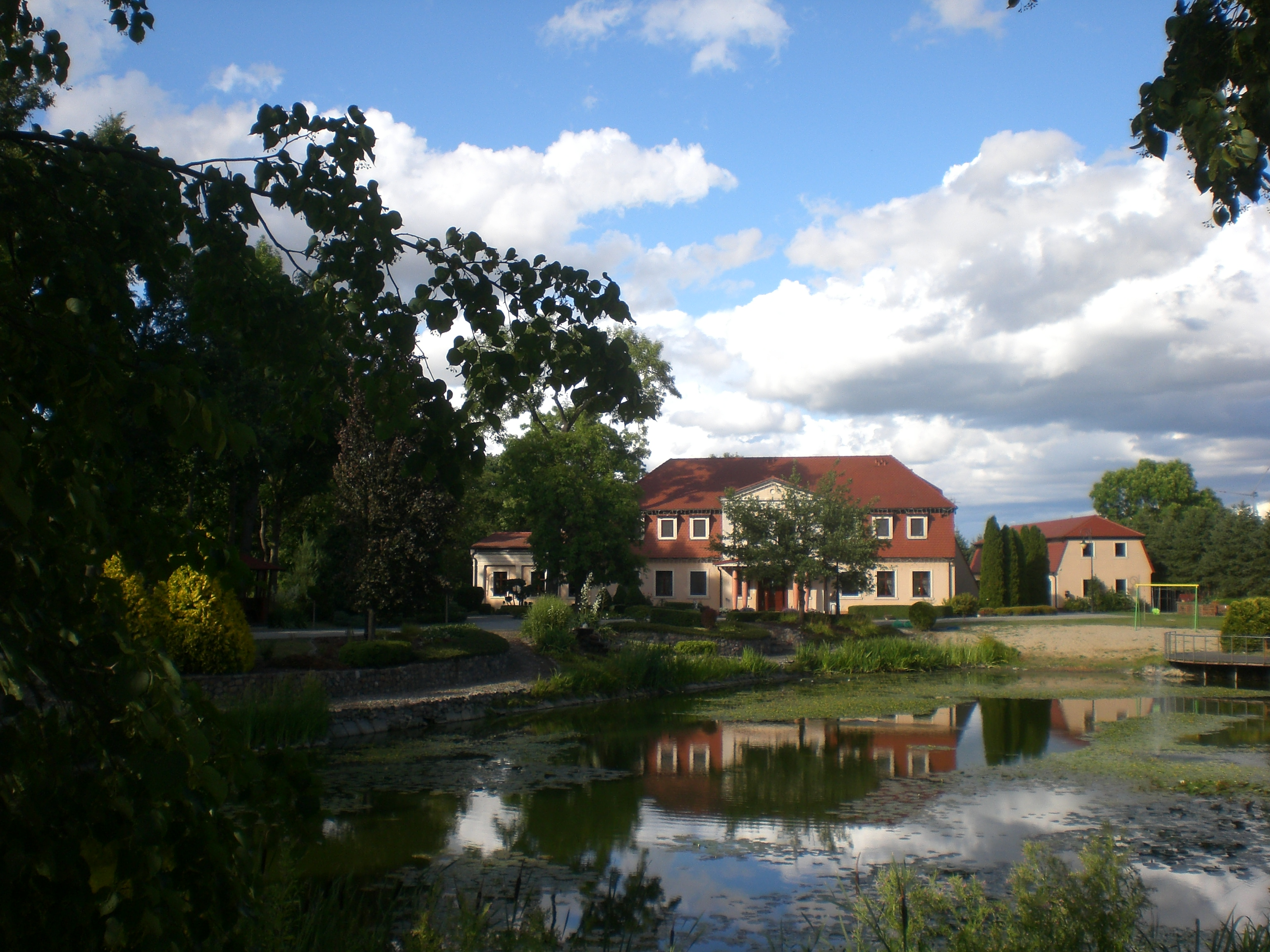

- Location within Poland
- Coordinates: 53°57′54″N 19°17′41″E
- Country: Poland
- Voivodeship: Pomeranian
- County: Sztum
- Gmina: Dzierzgoń
- Population: 560

Bruk ([bruk]) (German: Bruch) is a village in the administrative district of Gmina Dzierzgoń, within Sztum County, Pomeranian Voivodeship, in northern Poland.

For the history of the region, see History of Pomerania.
