= Binduga, Pomeranian Voivodeship =

Binduga Bindëga
- Village
- Location within Poland
- Coordinates: 53°53′56″N 17°19′59″E
- Country: Poland
- Voivodeship: Pomeranian
- County: Chojnice
- Gmina: Konarzyny
- Population: 53

Binduga [binˈduɡa] (Kashubian: Bindëga) is a village in the administrative district of Gmina Konarzyny, within Chojnice County, Pomeranian Voivodeship, in northern Poland.

For details of the history of the region, see History of Pomerania.
