= Kępinka, Pomeranian Voivodeship =

Kępinka Małô Kãpina
- Colony
- Location within Poland
- Coordinates: 53°53′24″N 17°21′18″E
- Country: Poland
- Voivodeship: Pomeranian
- County: Chojnice
- Gmina: Konarzyny
- Population: 24

Kępinka [kɛmˈpinka] (Kashubian: Małô Kãpina) is a colony in the administrative district of Gmina Konarzyny, within Chojnice County, Pomeranian Voivodeship, in northern Poland.

For details of the history of the region, see History of Pomerania.
