= Josef Rudnick =

German businessman and politician

Josef Rudnick (25 May 1917 – 14 July 2009) was a German businessman and politician of the Christian Democratic Union of Germany.

== Biography ==
Rudnick was born in Sichts (today Żychce, Kashubia, Poland) in the Prussian Province of West Prussia and grew up in Deutsch Krone. He was active in catholic Youth organizations and founded a local group of young Catholics in 1935–36, which caused persecution by the Nazi authorities including a house search and an interrogation by the Gestapo.

After World War II Rudnick was expelled from his hometown, which became Polish and worked at the administration of Rheine in 1945–49. In 1950 Rudnick founded a clothing company, which became one of the leading German shirt-producers with about 1500 employees. He also engaged in the political reconstruction and was a founding member of the local CDU of the Kreis Steinfurt and their Youth organisation Junge Union.

Already throughout the 1960s and 70's Rudnick started to approach textile factories in Eastern Europe such as Wolczanka S.A. in Łódź. He was an active supporter of the Catholic Church in Poland and benefited the construction of the Church of the Congregation of the Sisters of Our Lady of Mercy in Łódź. Rudnick organised several transports of humanitarian aid throughout the Martial law in Poland.

Josef Rudnick died on 14 July 2009, four weeks after his wife.

== Awards ==
Rudnick was honored with

- Verdienstorden der Bundesrepublik Deutschland
- Verdienstorden des Landes Nordrhein-Westfalen
- Ludwig-Erhard-Medaille für Verdienste um die Soziale Marktwirtschaft
- Order of Merit of the Republic of Poland
- Honorary citizen of Łódź
- Papal merit medal (2002)
