= Jaranty =

Jaranty Jarantë
- Colony
- Location within Poland
- Coordinates: 53°56′4″N 17°22′1″E
- Country: Poland
- Voivodeship: Pomeranian
- County: Chojnice
- Gmina: Konarzyny
- Population: 39

Jaranty [jaˈrantɨ] (Kashubian: Jarantë) is a colony in the administrative district of Gmina Konarzyny, within Chojnice County, Pomeranian Voivodeship, in northern Poland.

For details of the history of the region, see History of Pomerania.
