= Żychce =

- Village
- Location within Poland
- Coordinates: 53°50′39″N 17°21′39″E
- Country: Poland
- Voivodeship: Pomeranian
- County: Chojnice
- Gmina: Konarzyny
- Population: 227

Żychce [ˈʐɨxt͡sɛ] is a village in the administrative district of Gmina Konarzyny, within Chojnice County, Pomeranian Voivodeship, in northern Poland.

For details of the history of the region, see History of Pomerania.

== Notable residents ==
- Heros von Borcke (1835–1895), Prussian cavalry officer
- Josef Rudnick (1917–2009), businessman and politician
