= Niepszczołąg =

- Colony
- Location within Poland
- Coordinates: 53°52′27″N 17°26′4″E
- Country: Poland
- Voivodeship: Pomeranian
- County: Chojnice
- Gmina: Konarzyny
- Population: 4

Niepszczołąg [ɲɛpʂˈt͡ʂɔwɔnk] is a colony in the administrative district of Gmina Konarzyny, within Chojnice County, Pomeranian Voivodeship, in northern Poland.

For details of the history of the region, see History of Pomerania.
