= Blunaki =

- Village
- Location within Poland
- Coordinates: 53°53′9″N 19°17′5″E
- Country: Poland
- Voivodeship: Pomeranian
- County: Sztum
- Gmina: Dzierzgoń
- Population: 120

Blunaki [bluˈnaki] is a village in the administrative district of Gmina Dzierzgoń, within Sztum County, Pomeranian Voivodeship, in northern Poland.

Before 1772 the area was part of Kingdom of Poland, and in 1772-1945 it belonged to Prussia and Germany. For the history of the region, see History of Pomerania.
