= Prakwice =

- Village
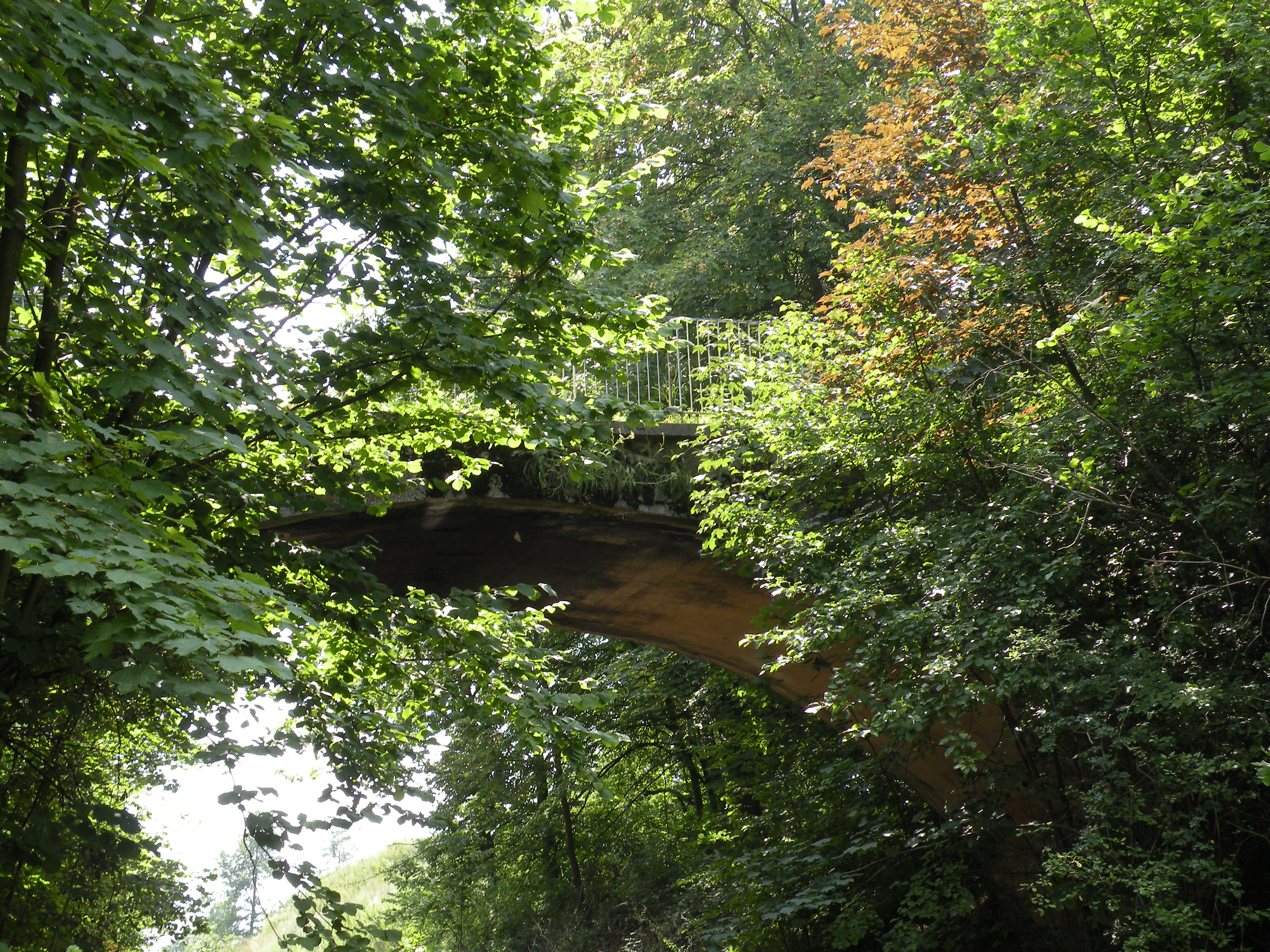
- Road bridge over the dismantled railway line in Prakwice

- Location within Poland
- Coordinates: 53°54′47″N 19°23′01″E
- Country: Poland
- Voivodeship: Pomeranian
- County: Sztum
- Gmina: Dzierzgoń

Prakwice [prakˈfit͡sɛ] is a village in the administrative district of Gmina Dzierzgoń, within Sztum County, Pomeranian Voivodeship, in northern Poland.
