= Ciecholewy, Chojnice County =

Ciecholewy Cechòlewë
- Village
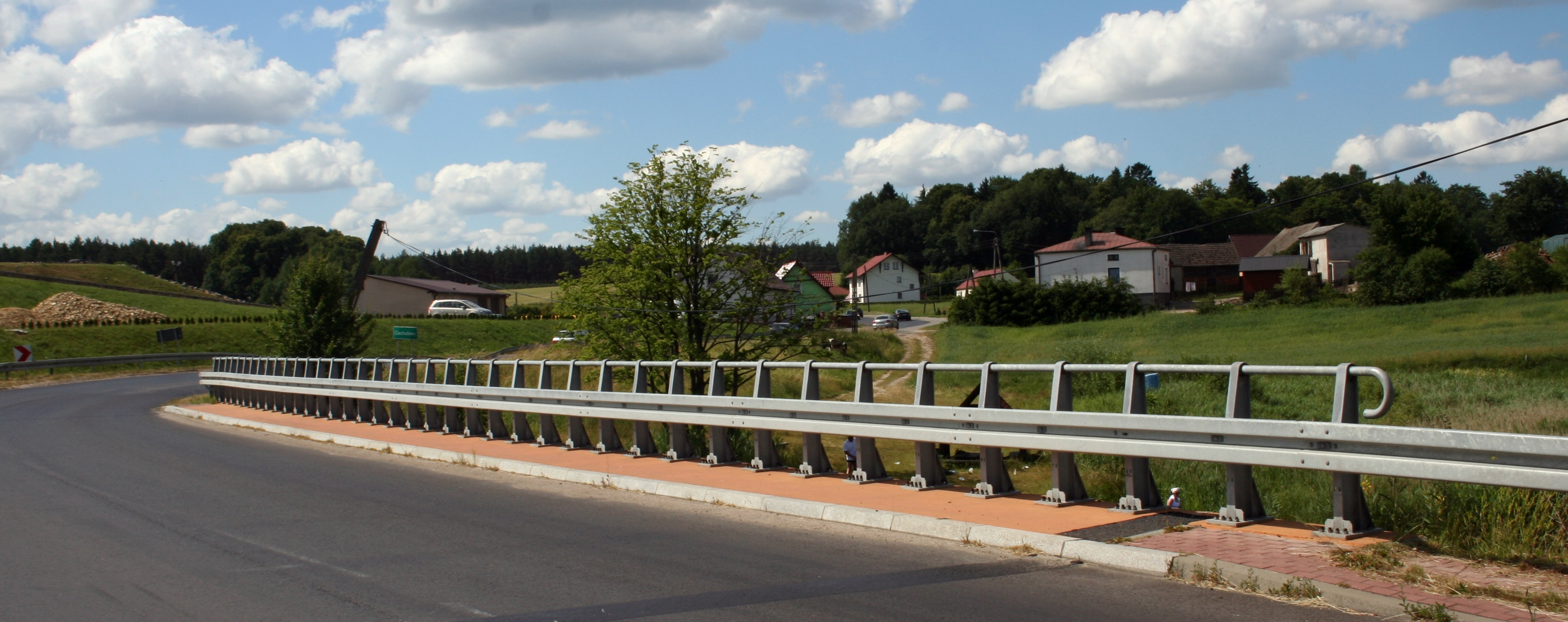

- Location within Poland
- Coordinates: 53°48′34″N 17°22′51″E
- Country: Poland
- Voivodeship: Pomeranian
- County: Chojnice
- Gmina: Konarzyny
- Population: 155

Ciecholewy [t͡ɕɛxɔˈlɛvɨ] (Kashubian: Cechòlewë) is a village in the administrative district of Gmina Konarzyny, within Chojnice County, Pomeranian Voivodeship, in northern Poland.

For details of the history of the region, see History of Pomerania.
