= Borne, Gmina Konarzyny =

Borne
- Settlement
- Location within Poland
- Coordinates: 53°49′22″N 17°24′53″E
- Country: Poland
- Voivodeship: Pomeranian
- County: Chojnice
- Gmina: Konarzyny
- Population: 12

Borne [ˈbɔrnɛ] is a settlement in the administrative district of Gmina Konarzyny, within Chojnice County, Pomeranian Voivodeship, in northern Poland.

For details of the history of the region, see History of Pomerania.
