= Budzisz =

- Village
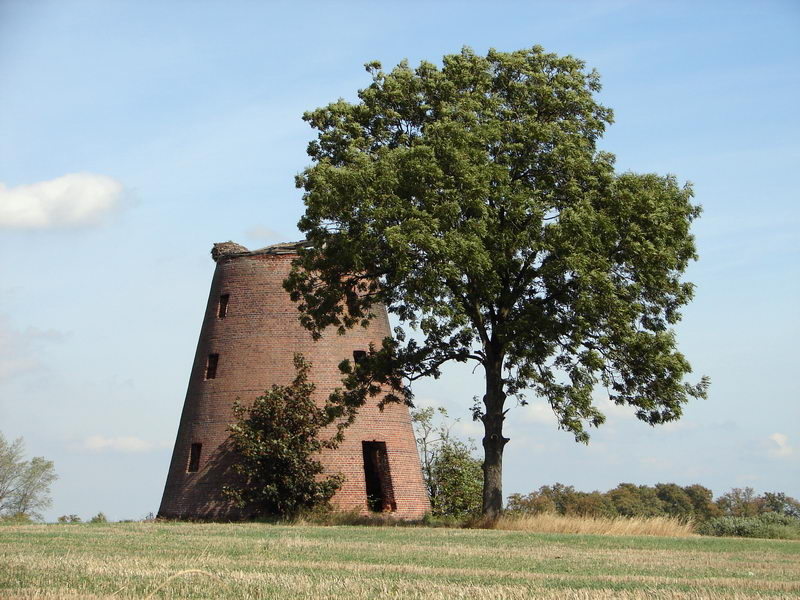
- Ruined smock mill in the village

- Location within Poland
- Coordinates: 53°58′57″N 19°16′15″E
- Country: Poland
- Voivodeship: Pomeranian
- County: Sztum
- Gmina: Dzierzgoń

Population
  - Total: 100

Budzisz [ˈbud͡ʑiʂ] is a village in the administrative district of Gmina Dzierzgoń, within Sztum County, Pomeranian Voivodeship, in northern Poland.
