= Popielewo, Chojnice County =

Popielewo
- Village
- Location within Poland
- Coordinates: 53°53′27″N 17°22′23″E
- Country: Poland
- Voivodeship: Pomeranian
- County: Chojnice
- Gmina: Konarzyny
- Population: 31

Popielewo [pɔpjɛˈlɛvɔ] is a village in the administrative district of Gmina Konarzyny, within Chojnice County, Pomeranian Voivodeship, in northern Poland.

For details of the history of the region, see History of Pomerania.
