= Lisi Las =

- Settlement
- Location within Poland
- Coordinates: 53°59′N 19°17′E
- Country: Poland
- Voivodeship: Pomeranian
- County: Sztum
- Gmina: Dzierzgoń

Lisi Las [ˈliɕi ˈlas] is a settlement in the administrative district of Gmina Dzierzgoń, within Sztum County, Pomeranian Voivodeship, in northern Poland.

For the history of the region, see History of Pomerania.
