= Zielona Huta =

Zielona Huta Zelonô Hëta
- Village

- Location within Poland
- Coordinates: 53°50′33″N 17°24′8″E
- Country: Poland
- Voivodeship: Pomeranian
- County: Chojnice
- Gmina: Konarzyny
- Population: 283

Zielona Huta (Polish: [ʑɛˈlɔna ˈxuta]; Kashubian: Zelonô Hëta) is a village in the administrative district of Gmina Konarzyny, within Chojnice County, Pomeranian Voivodeship, in northern Poland.

For details of the history of the region, see History of Pomerania.
