= Gmina Konarzyny =

Gmina Konarzyny Konarzyny Commune
- Gmina
- Flag Coat of arms
- Interactive map of Gmina Konarzyny
- Coordinates (Konarzyny): 53°49′22″N 17°22′38″E
- Country: Poland
- Voivodeship: Pomeranian
- County: Chojnice
- Seat: Konarzyny

Area
  - Total: 104.27 km^{2} (40.26 sq mi)

Population (2006)
  - Total: 2,178
  - Density: 20.89/km^{2} (54.10/sq mi)
- Website: https://konarzyny.pl

Gmina Konarzyny (Kashubian: Kònarzënë) is a rural gmina (administrative district) in Chojnice County, Pomeranian Voivodeship, in northern Poland. Its seat is the village of Konarzyny, which lies approximately 18 kilometres (11 mi) north-west of Chojnice and 102 km (63 mi) south-west of the regional capital Gdańsk.

The gmina covers an area of 104.27 square kilometres (40.3 sq mi), and as of 2006 its total population is 2,178.

== Villages ==
Gmina Konarzyny contains the villages and settlements of Binduga, Borne, Boryń, Ciecholewy, Duża Kępina, Dzięgiel, Jaranty, Jonki, Kępinka, Kiełpin, Konarzynki, Konarzyny, Korne, Niepszczołąg, Nierostowo, Nowa Karczma, Nowa Parszczenica, Parszczenica, Popielewo, Pustkowie, Rowista, Zielona Chocina, Zielona Huta, Złota Góra, Żychce and Żychckie Osady.

== Neighbouring gminas ==
Gmina Konarzyny is bordered by the gminas of Chojnice, Człuchów, Lipnica and Przechlewo.
