= Stanówko =

- Settlement
- Location within Poland
- Coordinates: 53°55′00″N 19°19′33″E
- Country: Poland
- Voivodeship: Pomeranian
- County: Sztum
- Gmina: Dzierzgoń

Stanówko [staˈnufkɔ] is a settlement in the administrative district of Gmina Dzierzgoń, within Sztum County, Pomeranian Voivodeship, in northern Poland.

For the history of the region, see History of Pomerania.
