= Duża Kępina =

Duża Kępina Wielgô Kãpina
- Colony
- Location within Poland
- Coordinates: 53°53′35″N 17°20′42″E
- Country: Poland
- Voivodeship: Pomeranian
- County: Chojnice
- Gmina: Konarzyny
- Population: 25

Duża Kępina [ˈduʐa kɛmˈpina] (Kashubian: Wielgô Kãpina) is a colony in the administrative district of Gmina Konarzyny, within Chojnice County, Pomeranian Voivodeship, in northern Poland.

For details of the history of the region, see History of Pomerania.
