= Zielona Chocina =

Zielona Chocina Zelonô Chòcëna
- Village

- Location within Poland
- Coordinates: 53°53′44″N 17°24′15″E
- Country: Poland
- Voivodeship: Pomeranian
- County: Chojnice
- Gmina: Konarzyny
- Population: 81

Zielona Chocina (Polish: [ʑɛˈlɔna xɔˈt͡ɕina]) (Kashubian: Zelonô Chòcëna) is a village in the administrative district of Gmina Konarzyny, within Chojnice County, Pomeranian Voivodeship, in northern Poland.

For details of the history of the region, see History of Pomerania.
