= Konarzyny, Chojnice County =

Konarzyny Kònôrzënë
- Village
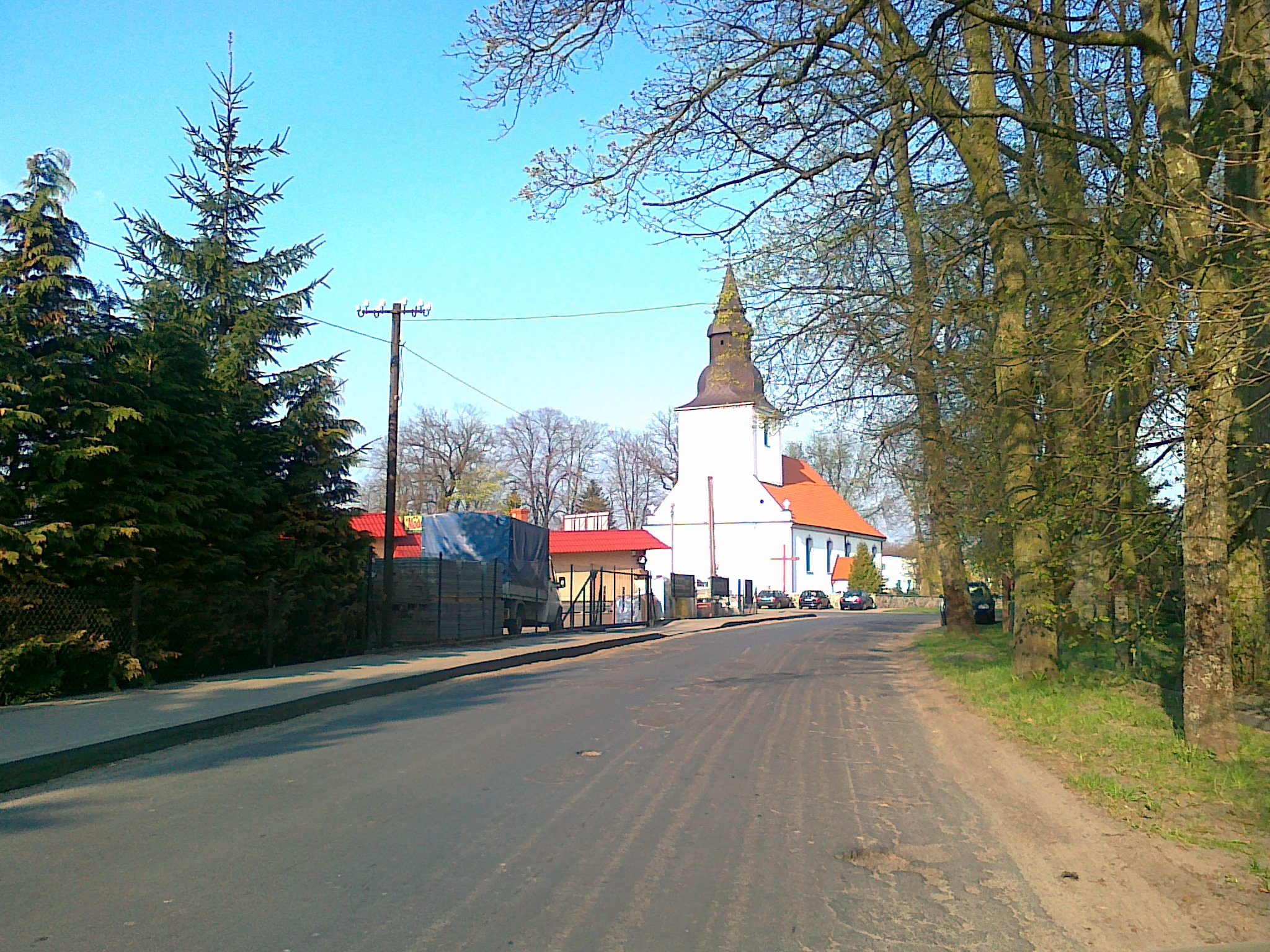

- Location within Poland
- Coordinates: 53°49′22″N 17°22′38″E
- Country: Poland
- Voivodeship: Pomeranian
- County: Chojnice
- Gmina: Konarzyny

Population
  - Total: 702
- Time zone: UTC+1 (CET)
  - Summer (DST): UTC+2 (CEST)

Konarzyny [kɔnaˈʐɨnɨ] (Kashubian: Kònôrzënë) is a village in Chojnice County, Pomeranian Voivodeship, in northern Poland. It is the seat of the gmina (administrative district) called Gmina Konarzyny. As of 2022, the village has a population of 702.
