= Żuławka Sztumska =

- Village
- Location within Poland
- Coordinates: 54°0′51″N 19°15′6″E
- Country: Poland
- Voivodeship: Pomeranian
- County: Sztum
- Gmina: Dzierzgoń
- Population: 560

Żuławka Sztumska [ʐuˈwafka ˈʂtumska] is a village in the administrative district of Gmina Dzierzgoń, within Sztum County, Pomeranian Voivodeship, in northern Poland.
