= Judyty, Pomeranian Voivodeship =

Judyty
- Village
- Location within Poland
- Coordinates: 53°55′39″N 19°20′47″E
- Country: Poland
- Voivodeship: Pomeranian
- County: Sztum
- Gmina: Dzierzgoń

Judyty [juˈdɨtɨ] is a village in the administrative district of Gmina Dzierzgoń, within Sztum County, Pomeranian Voivodeship, in northern Poland.

For the history of the region, see History of Pomerania.
