= Jasna, Pomeranian Voivodeship =

Jasna
- Village
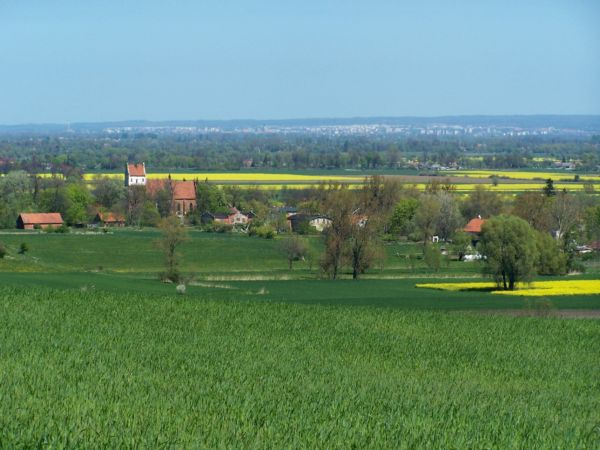

- Location within Poland
- Coordinates: 54°0′14″N 19°18′16″E
- Country: Poland
- Voivodeship: Pomeranian
- County: Sztum
- Gmina: Dzierzgoń
- Population: 350

Jasna [ˈjasna] is a village in the administrative district of Gmina Dzierzgoń, within Sztum County, Pomeranian Voivodeship, in northern Poland.
