= Nowa Karczma, Sztum County =

Nowa Karczma
- Settlement
- Location within Poland
- Coordinates: 53°56′02″N 19°19′28″E
- Country: Poland
- Voivodeship: Pomeranian
- County: Sztum
- Gmina: Dzierzgoń
- Time zone: UTC+1 (CET)
  - Summer (DST): UTC+2 (CEST)

Nowa Karczma [ˈnɔva ˈkart͡ʂma] is a settlement in the administrative district of Gmina Dzierzgoń, within Sztum County, Pomeranian Voivodeship, in northern Poland. It is located in the region of Powiśle.
