= Krzysztof Poliński =

Polish musician (born 1964)

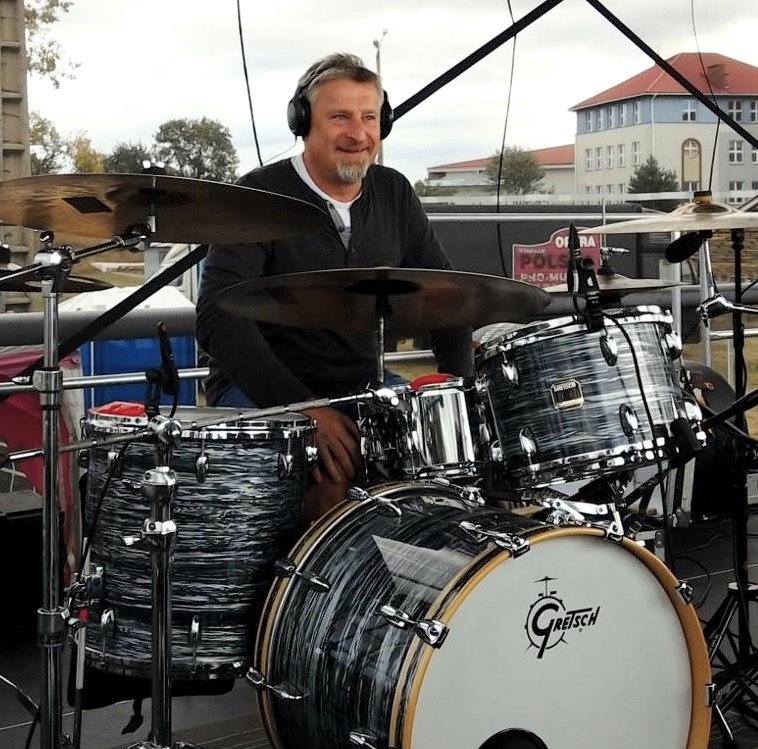
Krzysztof Poliński in 2015

Krzysztof "Polo" Poliński (born March 3, 1964, in Warsaw, Poland) is a Polish rock drummer, session musician, and arranger. Throughout his career, he has participated in numerous music projects encompassing genres such as jazz, blues, and hard rock, with particular focus on rock.

== Early career and cooperation with Edyta Bartosiewicz ==
In 1989, Krzysztof Poliński finished the Józef Elsner School of Music (2nd level) in Warsaw, Poland.

He began his musical career in the late 1980s as a member of jazz groups Blue Trane and Set Off. Together with Blue Trane, he won the second place at the Jazz Juniors Festival in Kraków, Poland, and the third place at a music festival in Dunkirk, France.

Between 1988 and 1990, he was a member of a band Holloee Poloy with which he recorded and published The Big Beat (1990). The album was also a phonographic debut of a well-known and highly recognized Polish rock artist Edyta Bartosiewicz. During the next ten years, as a member of Bartosiewicz's band, Poliński recorded albums Love (1992) (tracks 1–3, 6, 7, 10), Sen (1994), Szok'N'Show (1995), Dziecko (1997), Wodospady (1998), and Dziś są moje urodziny (1999) as well as played concerts around the country and abroad. By the end of September 1997, more than 200,000 copies of Dziecko had been sold in Poland, which brought the album a Platinum status.

== Early 2000s and cooperation with Urszula ==
In 2000, Poliński began an ongoing cooperation with another Polish rock artist – Urszula. As a member of her band, he has recorded albums Udar (2001), The Best (2002), Dziś już wiem (2010), Eony Snu (2013), Wielki odlot 2 – Najlepsze 80-te (2014), Biała droga Live – Woodstock Festival Poland 2015 (2015), and Biała droga Live (2016) and has performed around the country and abroad.

In February 2017, the album Urszula z kwartetem smyczkowym – Złote przeboje akustycznie came out. It presents songs recorded during a concert that took place on November 20, 2016, in Pałac Młodzieży (youth educational center) in Katowice, Poland. During this performance as well as the entire 2016 fall tournée, Urszula's band was accompanied by a string quartet of the AUKSO Chamber Orchestra of Tychy, Poland.

== Other projects ==
Between 2007 and 2013, Poliński was also a member of a rock band Vino. In 2007, the group participated in the national finals for the Eurovision Song Contest with the song "Come In My Heart" and ended at the fifth place. The same year, Vino also qualified to the second phase of the Vena Festival with the song "Rolling Sun". In 2012, Vino played several concerts which were part of Jack Daniel's Rocks as well as performed in the Hard Rock Café in Warsaw during the national finals for the global competition for upcoming bands – Hard Rock Rising. The ultimate winner had the opportunity to perform during the Hard Rock Calling festival in Hyde Park.

Krzysztof Poliński has also participated in a wide range of other projects which have resulted in albums Bananowe drzewa (1996) by rock band Róże Europy, Nie znasz mnie (2005) by singer Ewelina Flinta, The Triptic (2007) by hard rock band Sweet Noise, and Goodbye (2008) by Anita Lipnicka and John Porter. He also appeared on albums Kolory (1996) by band Firebirds and Zapamiętaj (2009) by band Bracia. Episodically, he worked with singer Irena Jarocka and group Oddział Zamknięty.

With addition to the recorded albums, the cooperation with Ewelina Flinta, Anita Lipnicka, and John Porter also led to numerous concert tours.

== dylan.pl ==
Since 2016, Poliński has been a member of Polish band dylan.pl (together with Filip Łobodziński, Jacek Wąsowski, Marek Wojtczak, and Tomasz Hernik). The group has prepared its own adaptations of 29 songs by legendary American musician Bob Dylan. In March 2017, dylan.pl released its first album – a two-disc Niepotrzebna pogodynka, żeby znać kierunek wiatru (2017). Its main publisher is a Polish media company Agora SA.

== Theater and film ==
Since 2000, Krzysztof Poliński has also regularly performed in a musical "Jeździec Burzy" staged by the Rampa Theater in Warsaw, Poland. The play tells the story of legendary American singer and poet Jim Morrison and the band of which he was a member – The Doors. In the musical, Poliński impersonates The Doors' drummer John Densmore by performing the band's music live throughout the entire show.

Moreover, as a result of the cooperation with a Polish composer Krzesimir Dębski, Krzysztof Poliński also recorded music for a Polish TV series Ranczo (2006–2016) as well as movies Magiczne Drzewo (2008), 1920 Bitwa Warszawska (2011), and Sztos 2 (2011).

== Charity work ==
During his artistic and professional career, Poliński has also taken part in numerous charity events, such as the Grand Finale fundraiser of the Great Orchestra of Christmas Charity.

In January 2009, Poliński also co initiated and participated in a charity concert for a Polish alpinist Paweł Kulinicz. The event was held in an art center Fabryka Trzciny in Warsaw, Poland.

== Awards ==
In January 2017, a Polish magazine for drummers Magazyn Perkusista recognized Poliński as one of the best 101 drummers in the country's history.

== Personal life ==
Krzysztof Poliński is married to Katarzyna and they have two daughters – Aleksandra and Agata.

Poliński lives in Otwock, Poland.

He's interested in history, railroading, and sport. He rides his bicycle and runs on a regular basis. In his free time, he also enjoys mushrooming and cooking.

For many years, he's been a fan of the Championship football team Bolton Wanderers F.C.

== Discography and guest appearances ==
- (1990) The Big Beat – Holloee Poloy
- (1992) Love – Edyta Bartosiewicz
- (1994) Sen – Edyta Bartosiewicz
- (1995) Szok'n'Show – Edyta Bartosiewicz
- (1996) Bananowe drzewa – Róże Europy
- (1996) Kolory – Firebirds
- (1997) Dziecko – Edyta Bartosiewicz
- (1998) Wodospady – Edyta Bartosiewicz
- (1999) Dziś są moje urodziny – Edyta Bartosiewicz
- (2001) Udar – Urszula
- (2002) The Best – Urszula
- (2005) Nie znasz mnie – Ewelina Flinta
- (2007) The Triptic – Sweet Noise
- (2008) Goodbye – Anita Lipnicka & John Porter
- (2009) Zapamiętaj – Bracia
- (2010) Dziś już wiem – Urszula
- (2013) Eony Snu – Urszula
- (2014) Wielki odlot 2 – Najlepsze 80-te – Urszula
- (2015) Biała droga Live - Woodstock Festival Poland 2015 – Urszula
- (2016) Biała droga Live – Urszula
- (2017) Niepotrzebna pogodynka, żeby znać kierunek wiatru
- (2017) Urszula z kwartetem smyczkowym - Złote przeboje akustycznie – Urszula

== Filmography ==
- (2006–2016) Ranczo
- (2008) Magiczne Drzewo
- (2011) 1920 Bitwa warszawska
- (2011) Sztos 2
