= Ranczo Wilkowyje =

Polish film

- Directed by: Wojciech Adamczyk
- Written by: Robert Brutter; Jerzy Niemczuk
- Starring: Ilona Ostrowska; Paweł Królikowski; Radosław Pazura; Artur Barciś; Dorota Chotecka; Franciszek Pieczka
- Cinematography: Janusz Sosnowski
- Edited by: Marek Król
- Music by: Krzesimir Dębski
- Production company: Studio A
- Release date: December 26, 2007
- Running time: 96 minutes
- Country: Poland
- Box office: $2,240,641

Ranczo Wilkowyje is a Polish film released in 2007 directed by Wojciech Adamczyk, which follows the story of television series produced by TVP Ranczo. The film was shown in cinemas and is available for sale on DVD.

== Additional Information ==
- Term began shooting on 17 July 2007. The photos were made in Latowicz and Jeruzal.
- English language has been replaced by a voice-over and Polish subtitles.

== Cast ==
Actor	Role
Ilona Ostrowska	Lucy Wilska
Cezary Żak	Priest Piotr Kozioł
Cezary Żak	Paweł Kozioł
Violetta Arlak	Halina Kozioł
Paweł Królikowski	Jakub "Kusy"
Marta Chodorowska	Klaudia Kozioł
Bogdan Kalus	Tadeusz Hadziuk
Piotr Pręgowski	Patryk Pietrek
Franciszek Pieczka	Stanisław "Stach" Japycz
Sylwester Maciejewski	Maciej Solejuk
Katarzyna Żak	Kazimiera Solejuk
Marta Lipińska	Michałowa
Grzegorz Wons	Andrzej Więcławski
Dorota Chotecka	Krystyna Więcławska
Artur Barciś	Arkadiusz Czerepach
Piotr Ligienza	Fabian Duda
Wojciech Wysocki	Doktor Mieczysław Wezół
Arkadiusz Nader	Policjant Stasiek
Magdalena Waligórska	Wioletka
Radosław Pazura	Louis
Danuta Borsuk	Mother of the bride
Filip Bobek	Flower deliverer
