= Robert Janson =

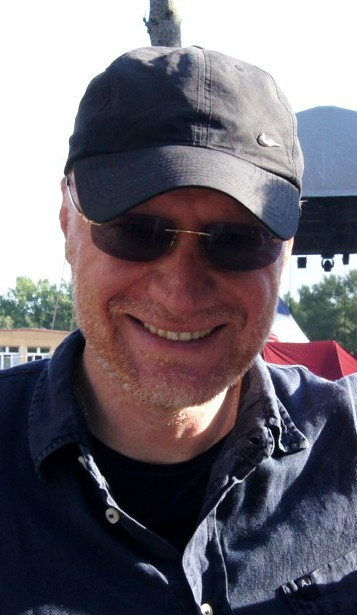
- Janson in 2012

Background information
- Born: 7 June 1965 (age 59); Czeladź, Poland
- Genres: Pop, pop rock
- Occupation(s): Musician, composer, singer, songwriter
- Instrument(s): Guitar, vocals
- Labels: BMG Poland, PolyGram Polska, Zic Zac, Agora

Robert Janson (born 7 June 1965 in Czeladź) is a Polish composer, singer, guitarist, leader and co-founder of pop band Varius Manx. He is a member of Polish Society of the Phonographic Industry.

In 1989, Robert Janson formed Varius Manx with the Marciniak brothers, Michał and Paweł. After Anita Lipnicka joined and the album Emu was released in 1994, the group became famous in Poland. Robert Janson received the Fryderyk award in 1995 and 1996 for Best Composer. In 1997, Janson decided to pursue his solo career and released his first solo album Trzeci Wymiar followed by another Nowy Świat 2 years later.

On 28 May 2006 Robert Janson, along with the other band members of Varius Manx, were involved in car accident in Milicz. Janson was in critical condition, vocalist Monika Kuszyńska had been partially paralysed from the waist down needed to use a wheelchair. Robert Janson was found guilty of causing an accident. The court sentenced him to two years suspended imprisonment and 11,000 PLN fine.

== Discography ==
=== Solo ===
- Trzeci wymiar (1997)
- Muzyka z filmu Nocne graffiti (1997)
- Nowy świat (1999)
- Świadectwo. Muzyka filmowa (2008)
