= Varius Manx =

Polish band

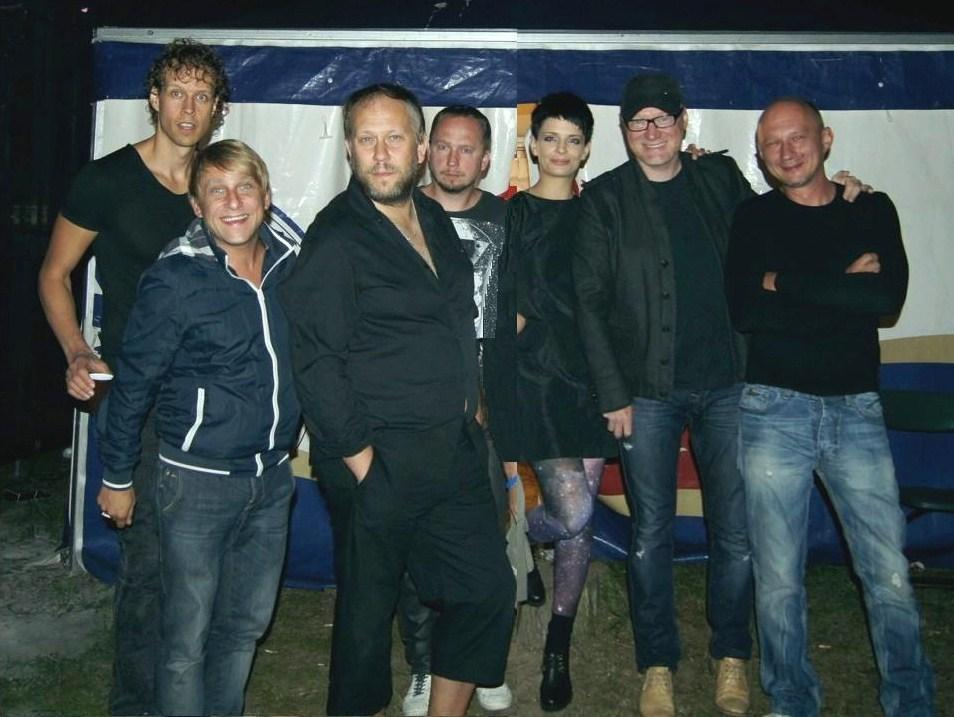
- Varius Manx (2012)

Background information
- Origin: Poland
- Genres: pop, pop rock
- Years active: 1989–present
- Labels: SPV, Zic Zac, BMG Poland, Pomaton EMI, Sony Music Entertainment Poland
- Members: Robert Janson; Michał Marciniak; Paweł Marciniak; Sławek Romanowski; Kasia Stankiewicz
- Past members: Edyta Kuczyńska; Anita Lipnicka; Monika Kuszyńska; Anna Józefina Lubieniecka
- Website: www.variusmanx.pl

Varius Manx are a Polish pop group, formed in Łódź in 1989 by composer Robert Janson. The name is a variation on the English word "various" plus Manx, the variety of cat. The band have sold more than 2 million albums in their native Poland.

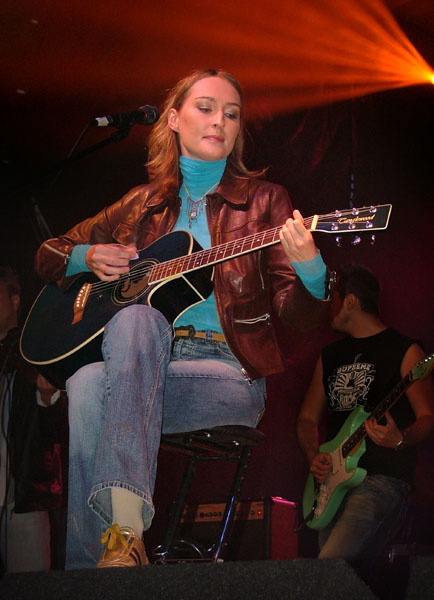
The band's original lead singer, Anita Lipnicka

The band's first album, The Beginning, which consisted entirely of instrumental music, was released in 1990 to measured success. The 1993 follow-up The New Shape, featured vocals by Janson, Robert Amirian, and guests including Edyta Bartosiewicz.

The band's breakthrough was its 1994 album Emu, which marked a stark change in artistic direction. The band now had a lead singer, Anita Lipnicka, and now performed primarily in Polish. The formula was highly successful, and both Emu and the subsequent album Elf (1995) each sold more than half a million copies. The band won the Polish music award, the Fryderyk, in 1995 for best musical group. The band provided much of the soundtrack to the film Młode wilki, featuring in part songs from Elf. In 1994 they won the Sopot International Song Festival.

In 1996 Varius Manx appeared on the television show Szansa na sukces (A Chance For Success), a karaoke show in which participants would sing the songs of the visiting band. The show was won by 19-year-old Kasia Stankiewicz. When, shortly afterward, Lipnicka left the band to pursue a solo career, the remaining members asked Stankiewicz to take her place. The resulting lineup recorded Ego, which was also highly successful, and produced what is probably Varius Manx's best-known song, "Orła cień" (An Eagle's Shadow), which was featured in the film Kiler. Like its two predecessors, the album included a number of songs in English.

In 1997 the band released its next album, End, this time entirely in Polish; it sold a respectable 130,000 copies, although far less than its predecessors. The same year, Varius Manx contributed to a second soundtrack, for the film Nocne Graffiti, after which it took a creative pause; Stankiewicz recorded her first solo album. Varius Manx released a greatest hits album in 2000, Najlepsze z dobrych (The Best of the Good), which included four new tracks as well as reworked versions of some of the band's hits. It was Kasia Stankiewicz's last album with the band, as she departed the following year to pursue her solo career.

Monika Kuszyńska was chosen as the band's new singer in May 2001. With her, the band recorded Eta (2001) and Eno (2002). In 2002 Varius Manx won the Baltic Prize in Karlshamn, Sweden with the song "Moje Eldorado". The cover for the band's 2004 album Emi was chosen in a competition, in which 317 suggestions were sent in; the winner was an image of a white cat, a play on the band's name.

On 28 May 2006, the band were involved in a serious car accident. Robert Janson and Monika Kuszyńska were badly injured. Janson recovered, however Kuszyńska remains paralysed. In summer 2006 in Sopot the most famous Polish artists (including the band's two previous vocalists) took part in a charity concert which was organised to raise money for the rehabilitation of Janson and Kuszyńska.

== Discography ==
Title	Album details	Peak chart positions	Sales	Certifications
Title	Album details	POL	Sales	Certifications
The Beginning	Released: March 5, 1990; Label: SPV; Formats: CD, CS	—		
The New Shape	Released: May 3, 1993; Label: SPV; Formats: CD, CS	—		
Emu	Released: June 6, 1994; Label: Zic Zac; Formats: CD, CS	—	POL: 800,000+	POL: 4× Platinum
Elf	Released: April 24, 1995; Label: Zic Zac; Formats: CD, CS	—	POL: 1,000,000+	POL: 5× Platinum
Ego	Released: June 21, 1996; Label: Zic Zac; Formats: CD, CS	—	POL: 400,000+	POL: 2× Platinum
End	Released: September 8, 1997; Label: Sony Music Poland; Formats: CD, CS	—	POL: 100,000+	POL: Platinum
Eta	Released: August 27, 2001; Label: Pomaton EMI; Formats: CD	13		
Eno	Released: September 21, 2002; Label: Pomaton EMI; Formats: CD, digital download	15		
Emi	Released: May 31, 2004; Label: Pomaton EMI; Formats: CD, digital download	—		
Eli	Released: March 21, 2011; Label: Sony Music Poland; Formats: CD, digital download	7		
Ent	Released: April 13, 2018; Label: Agora; Formats: CD, digital download	6		
"—" denotes a recording that did not chart or was not released in that territory.
