= Edyta Bartosiewicz =

Polish singer-songwriter (born 1965)

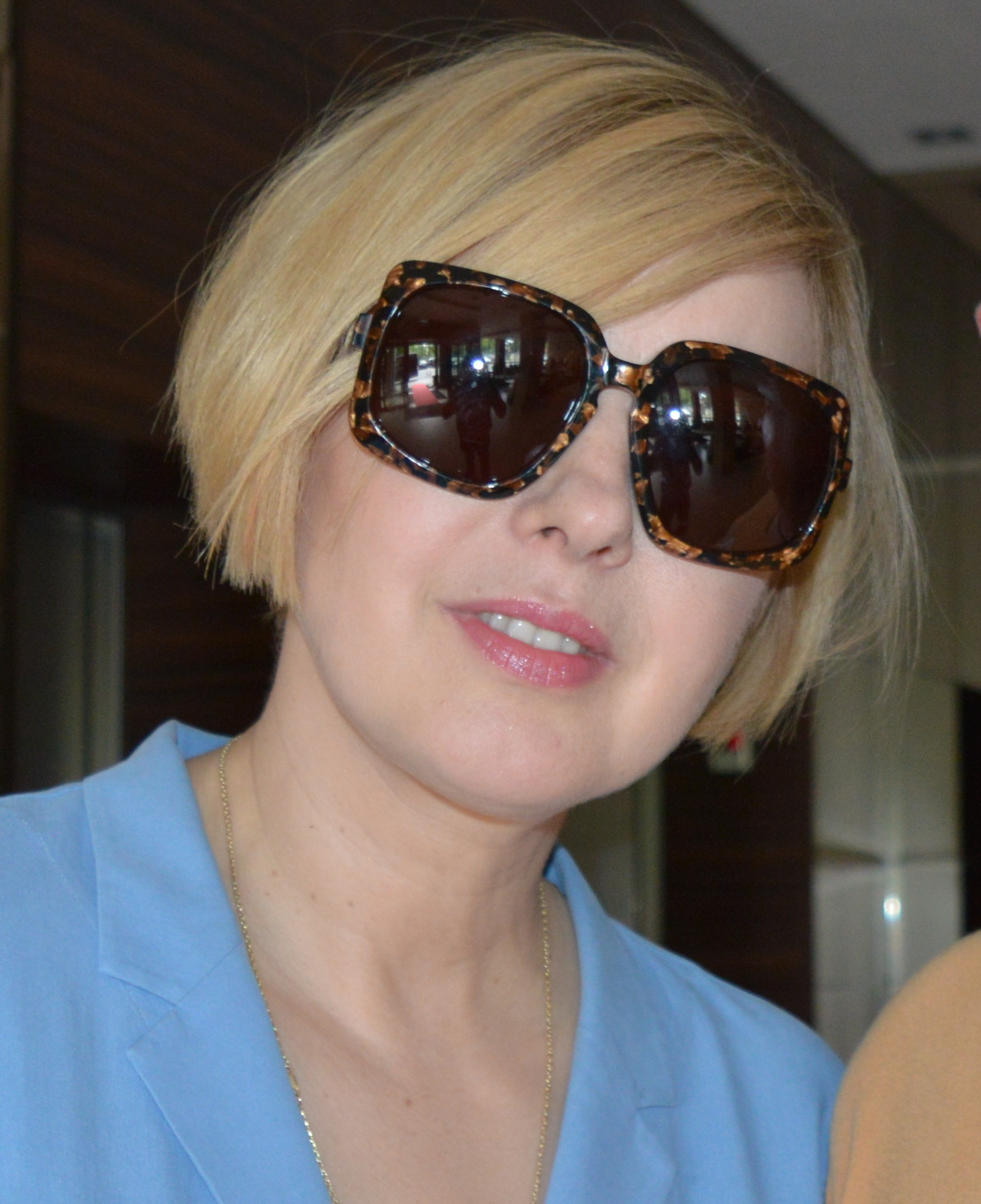
- Bartosiewicz in 2015

Background information
- Also known as: Edzia, Eddie
- Born: Edyta Małgorzata Bartosiewicz; 11 January 1965 (age 61); Warsaw, Poland
- Genres: Pop rock, rock
- Occupations: Composer, songwriter, singer
- Instruments: Vocals, guitar
- Years active: 1990–2002, 2004, 2010–
- Labels: Izabelin Studio, PolyGram Poland, Universal Music Poland, Parlophone Music Poland
- Website: www.edytabartosiewicz.com

Edyta Małgorzata Bartosiewicz (born 11 January 1965) is a Polish rock singer, composer, and songwriter. In Poland, she's known for her highly reflective and unusual lyrics. Sixteen of her singles reached the top of Polish Radio charts. Over the course of her musical career, she has received five Fryderyk awards – the most important recognition in the Polish music industry.

== Biography ==
=== Early career ===
Bartosiewicz learned to play guitar at age ten. She studied at Nicolaus Copernicus High School in Warsaw (XXXIII L.O. im. Mikołaja Kopernika), and was interested in sports, and later attended SGPiS in Warsaw (now SGH, Warsaw School of Economics.)

Interested in music and having played in a few bands, she left for London in 1986 where she met The Blue Aeroplanes. After her return to Warsaw, having dropped out of college, she joined the Staff group. In 1989 she won Mokotowska Jesień Muzyczna. In the following year, she appeared on The Big Beat, an album by the band Holloee Poloy (formerly the Staff group). She received a number of awards and sang guest and backing vocals on various records.

=== Solo career ===
Edyta quit Halloee Poloy due to, as she said herself, resistance to her composing and songwriting style. At the end of 1991 she started recording the album Love in studio S-4 in Warsaw. Rafał Paczkowski was responsible for the production of that album. This time her album was successful. By 2001, 67,000 copies had been sold and finally the album achieved Gold status. The most popular singles from this album were: “If”, “Goodbye to the Roman Candles,” “Blues for you”, “Have to Carry On”. The album was also released in Western Europe by Chrysalis Records but did not achieve much popularity there.

On 18 May 1994 the album “Dream” (Sen) was released by Izabelin Studio. It was recorded with a completely new band i.e. Michał Grymuza (guitars), Radosław Zagajewski (bass), Krzysztof Palczewski (keyboard). Leszek Kamiński ( Bartosiewicz's husband as of 1990) was responsible for the production. This time her new album was sung mostly in Polish unlike the previous one "Love", sung mostly in English. The music can be described as eclectic, including acoustic songs as well as hard rock songs such as cover of the song "Move Over" by Janis Joplin. Her songs: “Dream” (Sen), “Capricorn” (Koziorożec), “Tattoo” (Tatuaż), or “Joke at a Zoo” (Żart w zoo) were a huge success on the music charts.

In 1994, at the end of September, nine concerts were given in the nine biggest Polish cities. The tour was a huge success, as well as the album, which achieved Platinum status after selling over 300 thousand copies. Bartosiewicz herself was declared the best singer by the readers of the Polish magazine "Only Rock" ("Tylko Rock" – now known as "Teraz Rock" ["Now Rock"]), and the album's title song "Dream" ("Sen") is still one of her best known. The singer also received two 1995 Fryderyk Awards in the category: Best Artist and Best Pop/Rock Album.

By the beginning of 1995 a new single “Wonderful tonight” was released. It was a cover of Eric Clapton song and it reached second place on Hit Parade of Program 3 (Polish radio station). At the beginning of July the single "Madness" ("Szał") was released to promote the album "Shock’n’show (Szok'n'show)".

In October people saw Edyta perform live in 13 cities. The tour ended in May 1996. The biggest hits were: the promotional single “Madness”, Time of high tide”, “The Clock” (“Zegar”) which was released as a single in November, and the great, immortal ballad “The Last One” (“Ostatni”). The single “Anger is no use” (“Na nic gniew”) which was released during that summer is also worth noting. The album “Shock’n’Show” received the platinum status and to this day more than 280.000 of MC and CD copies have been sold. In 1995 the album won the Fryderyk (Polish music award) in the category Rock Album, and was nominated in eight different categories. The readers of music magazines lauded her work:

- The Best Album Award – readers of “Only Rock” (“Tylko Rock”) plebiscite
- The Best Singer Award – readers of “Only Rock” plebiscite
- Second place in Hit of the year category – readers “Only Rock” plebiscite
- Seventh place for “The Clock”
- Second place in the Best Singer category – readers of “Brum” plebiscite
- The Best Video of the Year Award for “Madness” – readers of “Brum” plebiscite

The video for “The Clock” won “Zloty Yacht” in category The Best Video of the Year. A new challenge for Bartosiewicz at the end of 1995 was a music production of an album of the group Firebirds.

The year 1996 was as impressive in Bartosiewicz's career as the previous one. She played dozens of concerts, including July 9 when she opened Bryan Adams’ concert in the Spodek Katowicki. She was a star during "Wegorzewo 1996" (Polish music festival). Edyta's recital during Sopot Festival was very well received. It was there that she achieved Platinum status for her albums "Dream" and "Shock’n’show". She received a warm reception. The recital lasted about 40 minutes but thanks to enthusiastic reaction of the public it was prolonged for 4 encores. Edyta performed her biggest hits but also presented her two new songs "Only a moment" ("Tylko moment") and "Think about me" ("Pomyśl o mnie"), which became a single.

In October she started working on her new album, which was recorded in January and February 1997. The premiere of Edyta's fourth album entitled "Dziecko" ("Child") took place on June 9, and the single "Jenny" got airplay in radio stations from April 21. By September more than 100.000 copies were sold, and the album was in the top ten of bestselling albums of the year. The album was promoted on tour and a second single "Skłamałam" ("I Lied"), became a big hit. During a concert in "Stodola" (Stodoła) in Warsaw she went platinum yet again for the "Dziecko" (more than 200.000 CD and MC sold). Next singles: "Nie znamy się” („We Don't Know Each Other”), ‘Boogie czyli zemsta slodka jest’ and the title track “Dziecko” enjoyed popularity. In February Edyta played three concerts in the United States and Canada. In March 1998 Edyta once again won the Fryderyk for “Best Rock Album”. Additionally, she was nominated in five other categories. The album “Dziecko” is thought to be the most honest album of Polish rock and, generally speaking, Polish entertainment music. (Machina 03/02).

In July 1998 Edyta entered the studio to record a new album. This time it was not with Leszek Kaminski but with an English publisher Rafał Mckenna who also worked with artists such as Blur, Pulp, or Radiohead. The first song from this album was "Miłość jak ogień" ("Love Like Fire") which immediately reached No. 1 on Polish hit lists. The premiere of the album "Wodospady" ("Waterfalls") took place on 9 November 1998. Another single was the title track. The reviews characterized it as the most mature of her albums. Songs like "Mandarynka" ("Mandarin") revealed Edyta's interest in psychedelic music. On the other hand, Edyta did not turn her back on the image known from her previous albums, confirmed with songs like "Miłość jak ogień" and "Wodospady Łez". In many reviews it is said that the most distinguished long plays are "Dream", "Child" and "Waterfalls". The video to the third single "Siedem mórz, siedem ladów" ("Seven Seas, Seven Lands") was shot in picturesque landscapes in the US (precincts of Los Angeles). In May 1999 the last single promoting "Waterfalls", entitled "The Rebel" ("Buntowniczka") was released. To date, 75,000 copies have been sold which gave Edyta another golden status title. In 1998 she was nominated to the Fryderyk in multiple categories.

On 29 November 1999 the album Today are my birthday- the best of ("Dziś są moje urodziny- the best of") was released. This was the album summing up Edyta's artistic work and was promoted with the song "21st century" ("XXI wiek"). The album, as Edyta admitted, a contractual obligation. At the beginning of 2000 the song "Master" ("Mistrz") was released and promoted a medley. She ended 1999 with a departure from her record label Universal Music Polska.

The year 2000 started with a prestigious award for Personality of the Decade presented by "Only Rock" magazine. In February 2000 Edyta collaborated with Justyna Steczkowska. She wrote a number of lyrics for Justyna's album "Day & Night". Moreover, she also made a well-matched duet with Kazik Staszewski in the hit-song "Four Rooms", which promoted Kazik's album "Melassa". In the same year she collaborated with Anita Lipnicka. Together they created "The Last Letter" song – Edyta prepared the music and Anita wrote the lyrics. Effect of that collaboration was presented on Anita's album "My eyes are green" (2000). In January 2001 Edyta, together with the band Agressiva 69, recorded the title song for Mariusz Treliński's movie Egoists.

In January 2001 the song "The Tale" appeared on the subsequent volume of the Fridays for fives medley by Radio ZET. The song became a hit. The beginning of 2001 also brought changes to Edyta's group: drummer Krzysztof Poliński was replaced by Przemek Momot, who had worked with, among others, Kasia Nosowska, Robert Gawliński, groups Yugoton and Women; and bass player Radek Zagajewski was replaced by Michał Grott. In November 2001 Edyta published a re-release of her first solo album Love. The album was published in Universal's series "Invincible". Bartosiewicz was also asked to write a number of lyrics for Edyta Górniak’s album The Pearl (2002). The song "I don't ask for more" became a second single from that album. Edyta is also author of the lyrics for the title track, which was released as a fourth single.

At the beginning of 2002 Edyta signed a contract with BMG Poland and on 4 March she started work on a new album. On 17 June the single "Innocence", that was supposed to promote the new album, was released. On 29 June the video clip for that song was broadcast. The new album was supposed to be released in August 2002; however, for unknown reasons, and despite the fact that the album was finished, the release-date was postponed multiple times. After a while Edyta and BMG Poland declared the contract null and void, and to date the album has not been released.

In 2004, quite unexpectedly, Edyta performed in a duet with Krzysztof Krawczyk in a song "It's hard for... (us to be together)". That song became a second single from Krawczyk's album "That which is important in life" and achieved a great commercial success on the market, becoming the biggest hit of 2004. In August, Edyta appeared together with Krzysztof Krawczyk during the Sopot music festival. Moreover, Edyta performed during 2004 New Year's Eve concert organized by TVP (state-owned Polish Television). The year 2004 was extremely successful for Edyta Bartosiewicz. She managed a comeback in media and was on the covers of many popular magazines for a long time.

After a 6-month break Edyta returned on 5 June 2005, performing on Cracowian Main Market Square during the Enchanted Song Festival. Edyta was among such stars as: Anna Maria Jopek, Sylwia Wiśniewska, Urszula, Andrzej Piaseczny, Grzegorz Turnau, Michał Wiśniewski, and Paweł Kukiz. She truly enchanted the crowd with her two hit songs: “Jenny” and “The Last One”.

In September 2005, Edyta performed during a special 10-year-anniversary concert for Myslovitz; during which she performed the song “I would like to die of love” together with Myslovitz’s frontman, Artur Rojek.

Motivated by the huge success of her duet with Krzysztof Krawczyk, Edyta returned to work on her new album. She returned to Sony & BMG (formerly BMG Poland) and the release of her new album was scheduled for spring 2006. Unfortunately, just when the album was about to be released, a tragedy happened. Manager, concert organizer and Edyta's best friend – Jacek Nowakowski, died on 9 March. He was only thirty-four. Edyta, devastated, cancelled the release of the new album.

On 2 September 2006 Edyta performed during a Tomasz Stańko, her last appearance for two years. She returned to the stage on 5 July 2008 at the TOPtrendy Festival in Sopot, on the occasion of Krzysztof Krawczyk's 45th anniversary on stage. With Krawczyk, she performed "The Tale" and "It's Hard For... (Us to Be Together)."

== Discography ==
=== Studio albums ===
Title	Album details	Peak chart positions	Sales	Certifications
Title	Album details	POL	Sales	Certifications
Love	Released: 1992; Label: Izabelin Studio; Formats: CD, cassette, LP	—		
Sen	Released: 1994; Label: Izabelin Studio; Formats: CD, cassette, digital download	—	POL: 600,000+	POL: 3× Platinum
Szok'n'Show	Released: 1995; Label: Izabelin Studio, PolyGram Poland; Formats: CD, cassette, digital download	—	POL: 400,000+	POL: 2× Platinum
Dziecko	Released: 1 June 1997; Label: Izabelin Studio, PolyGram Poland; Formats: CD, cassette, digital download	—	POL: 200,000+	POL: Platinum
Wodospady	Released: 9 November 1998; Label: Izabelin Studio, PolyGram Poland; Formats: CD, cassette, digital download	—		
Renovatio	Released: 1 October 2013; Label: Parlophone Music Poland; Formats: CD, LP, digital download	1	POL: 30,000+	POL: Platinum
Ten moment	Released: 8 May 2020; Label: Eba Records	5		
"—" denotes a recording that did not chart or was not released in that territory.

=== Compilation albums ===
Title	Album details	Peak chart positions
Title	Album details	POL
Dziś są moje urodziny	Released: 29 November 1999; Label: Universal Music Poland; Formats: CD, cassette, digital download	26
Love & More	Released: 27 October 2014; Label: Polskie Radio; Formats: CD, LP, digital download	—
"—" denotes a recording that did not chart or was not released in that territory.

== Selected awards ==
- 1990 Mateusz Święcicki Award (Nagroda im. M. Święcickiego)
- 1992 Amber Nightingale Award – Sopot festival
- 1994 Fryderyk Awards – Best Artist and Best Pop/Rock Album
- 1994 Fryderyk Awards – Best Female Vocalist
- 1995 Fryderyk Awards – Best Rock Album (also eight other nominations)
- 1997 Fryderyk Awards – Best Rock Album (and five other nominations)
- 2004 Fryderyk Awards – Best Song Trudno tak...razem być nam ze sobą (So hard...for us to be together)
