= Jeruzal, Mińsk County =

Jeruzal
- Village
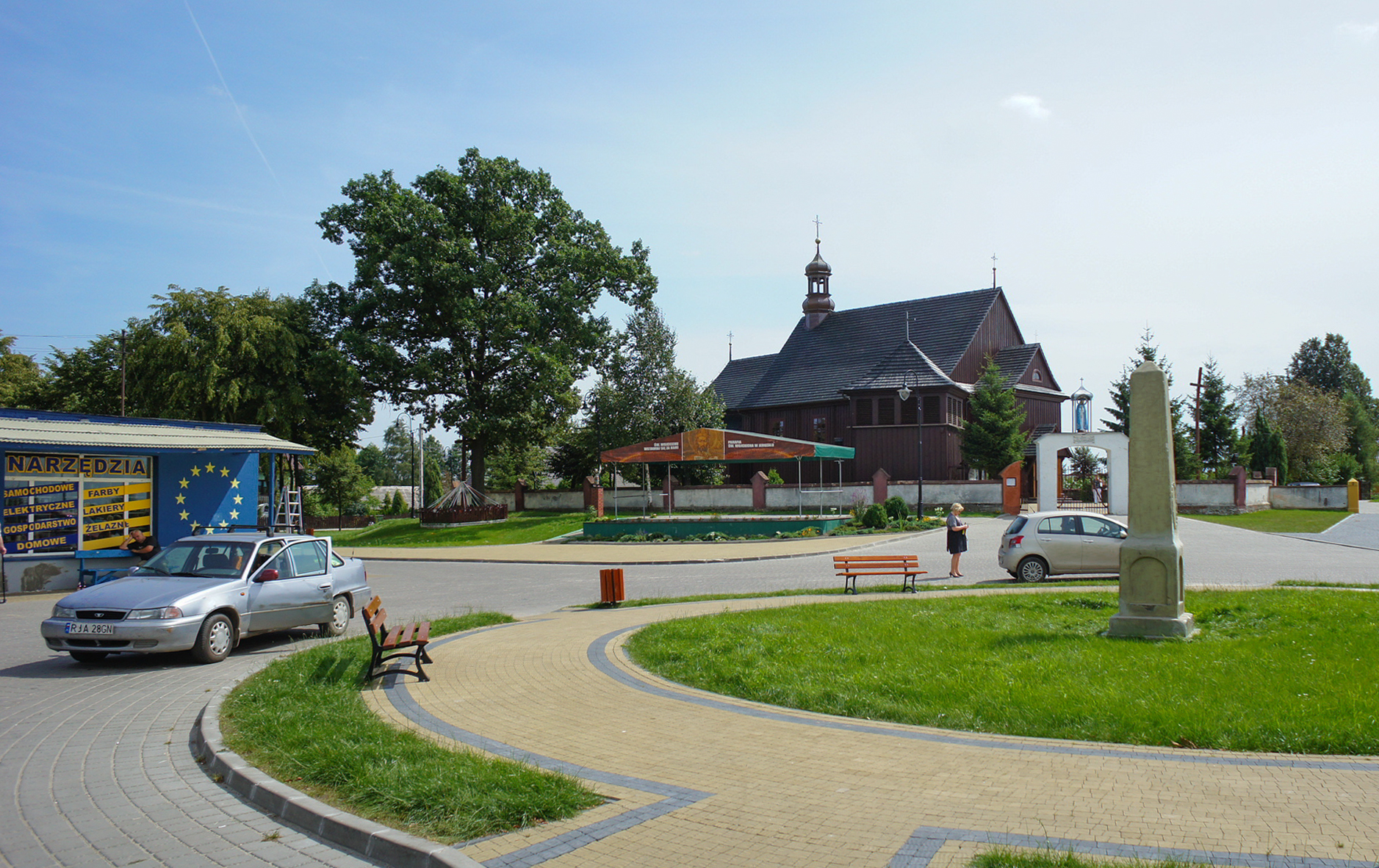

- Location within Poland
- Coordinates: 52°3′57″N 21°50′53″E
- Country: Poland
- Voivodeship: Masovian
- County: Mińsk
- Gmina: Mrozy
- Population: 316

Jeruzal [jɛˈruzal] is a village in the administrative district of Gmina Mrozy, within Mińsk County, Masovian Voivodeship, in east-central Poland.

== History ==
The village was first mentioned in 1426 with the name Żeliszew. From the 16th to the 18th centuries, the town was the property of various noble families: the Oborskis, Głogów Rudzińskis, and the Cieszkowskis. In 1533 the Oborskis granted the privilege to set up a private town here. They erected it as a parish. Initially, the city functioned under the names Żeliszew and Łukowiec. Because the town was located just a few kilometers away from four other cities - Latowicz, Kuflew, Seroczyn and Wodynie - the economy never developed. In the 18th century, the city had a population of just 150. The situation did not improve when the town's name was changed to Jeruzalem (Jerusalem), the name which eventually evolved into today's form.

During the Counter-Reformation and the Swedish Deluge the town was a local pilgrimage center. In 1810, Jerusalem still only had 198 residents and around 1820 the town finally lost its charter (lost its civic rights).

== Landmarks ==
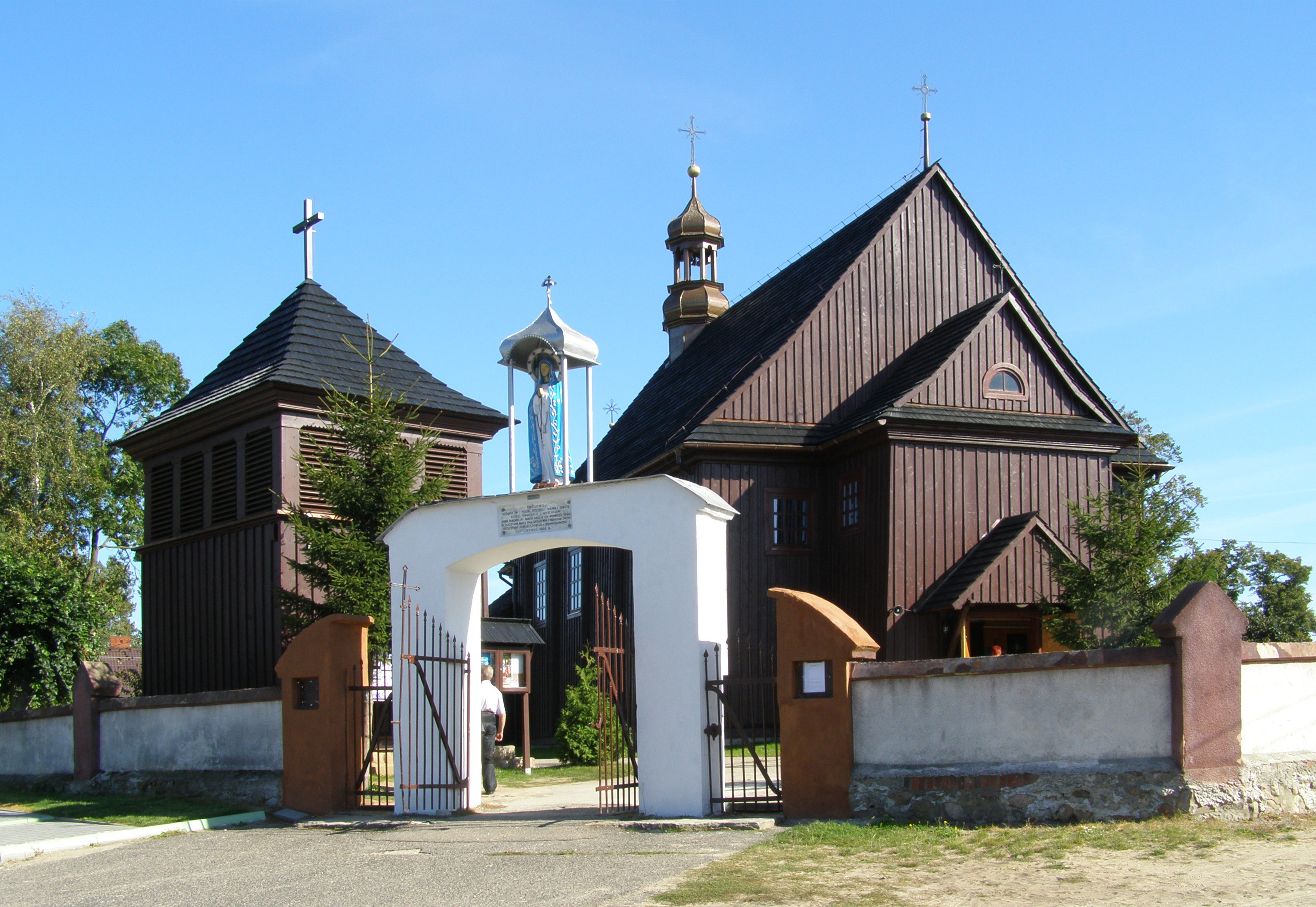
The church in Jeruzal showing the gate, facade and bell tower

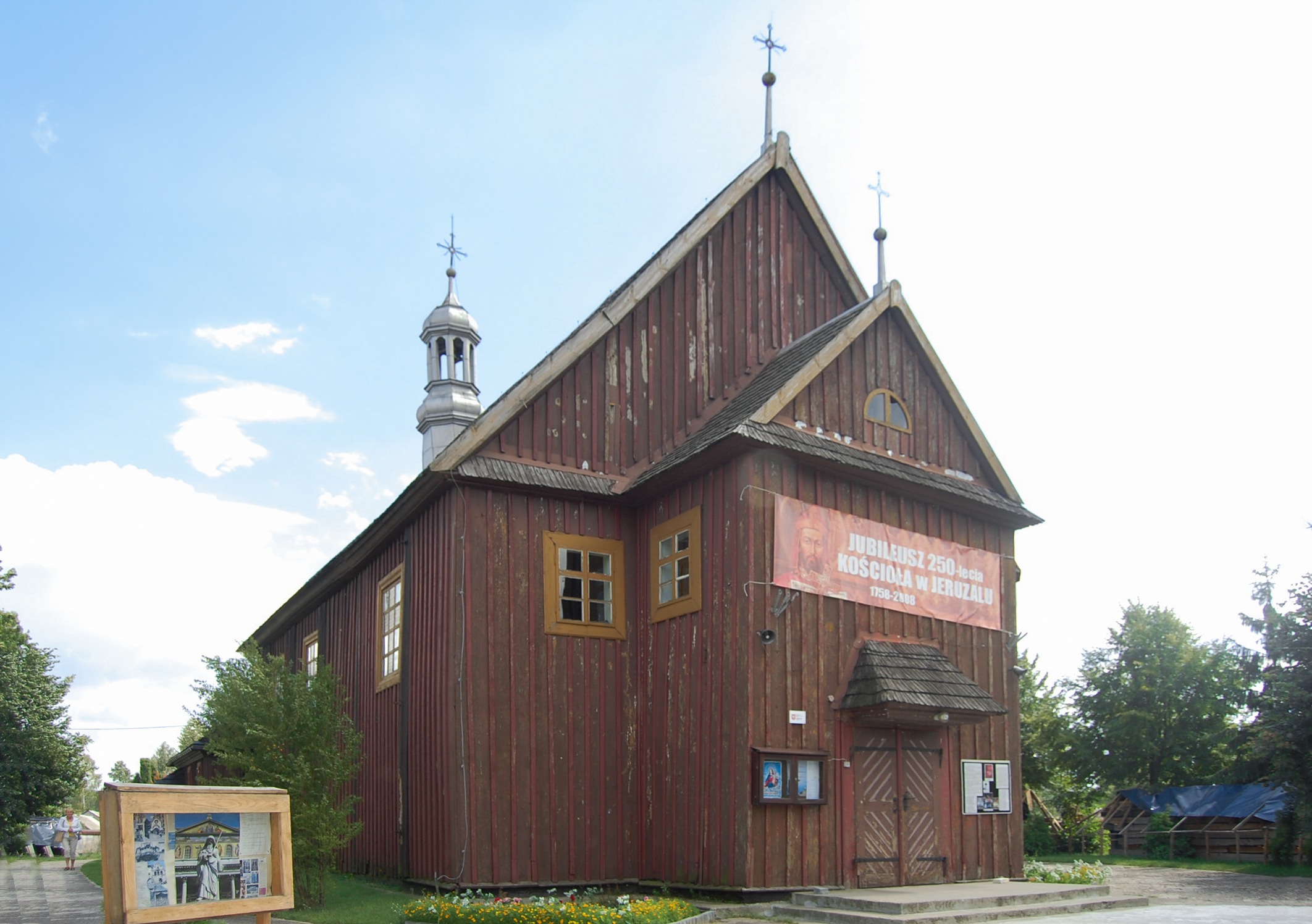
In 2008 the church celebrated its 250th anniversary

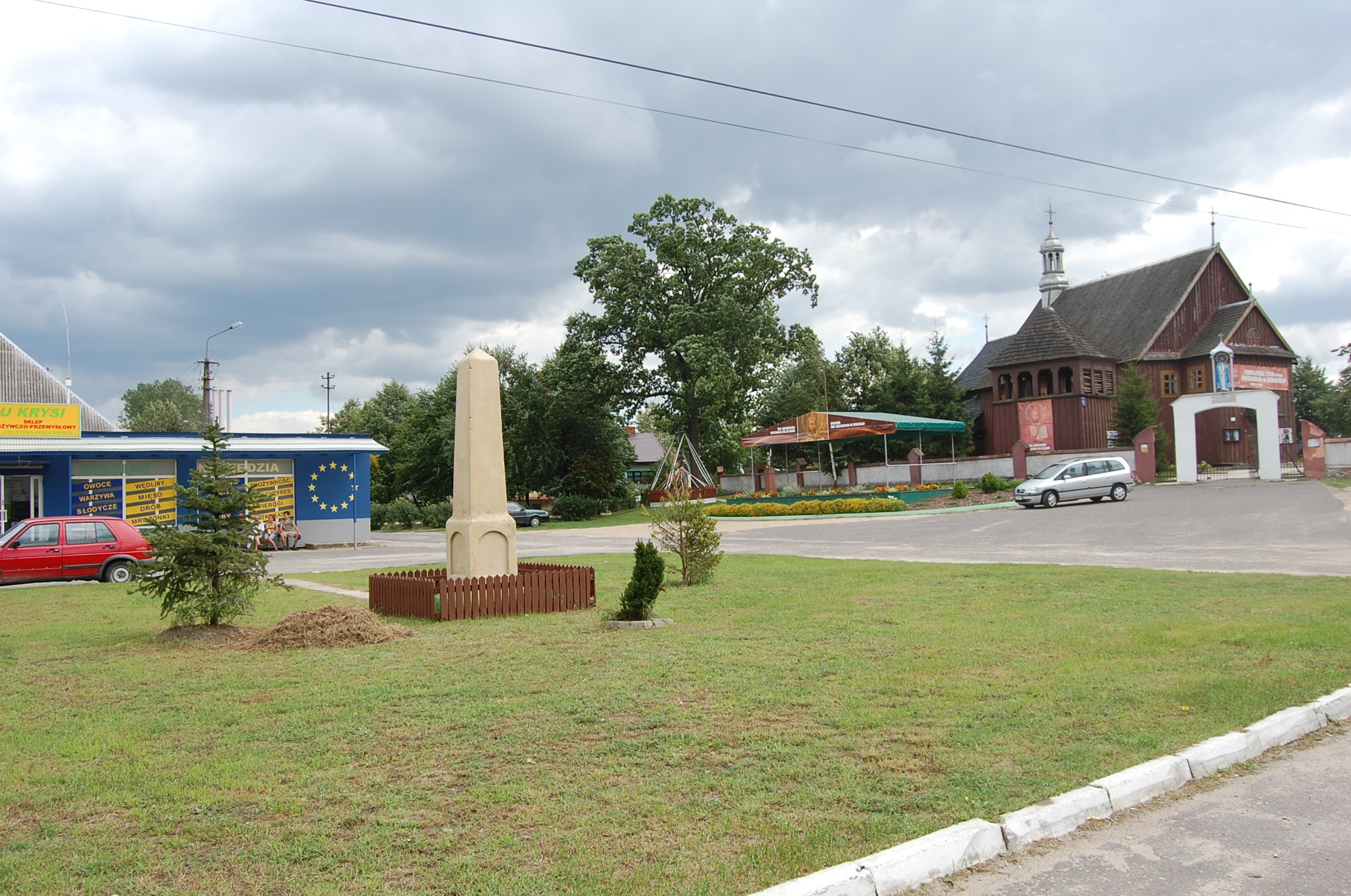
The town square showing the church and shop familiar to many viewers of the Ranczo TV series

=== The church ===
With the founding of the parish in the 16th century, the first wooden church of St. Wojciech of Jeruzalu was built (for the Bishop of Pozńan, Jan Latalski), but was later destroyed. In its place, a new church was built from 1757 to 1758, which, with small changes in the process of remodeling in the 19th century, has survived to this day.

The church is wooden, deployed on a cruciform plan with an added vestry. It has a gable roof, covered with shingles. Between the nave and the chancel is a characteristic of this type of construction - a rainbow arch and on it a crucifix and statues of the Virgin Mary and St. John from the 16th century. The interior is richly decorated in baroque style with medieval elements.

The church is the seat of the St. Wojciech parish, which belongs to the Siennicki deanery, which is part of the Diocese of Warsaw-Praga.

=== The parish ===
This parish was created in 1532, with the seat in city church, at 2 Square. It belongs to Siennica Deanery, Warsaw-Praga Diocesy and Warsaw Metropolis of Catholic Church. Since 2017 the church priest is Wojciech Olędzki.

To this parish belong: Barania Ruda, Borki, Dębowce, Florianów, Gajówka, Jeruzal, Jeziorek, Lipiny, Łukówiec, Płomieniec, Porzewnica and Topór - all from Gmina Mrozy.

=== Other landmarks ===
- A wooden bell tower from the 18th century
- A neoclassical triumphal arch built as a memorial to Florian Cieszkowski in 1798
- A building from 1920 which now houses a branch of the Municipal Public Library in Mrozy. It was formerly the seat of the Municipal Office
- The form of the rectangular market dates from medieval times, with a rectangular layout measuring 100 to 120m, located at the intersection of the main roads

== Trivia ==
The town has gained some fame in Poland as the location of the long-running comedy series Ranczo.
