= Still Here (TV series) =

Polish comedy drama television series

- Polish SkyShowtime poster
- Genre: Comedy drama
- Written by: Jakub Żulczyk
- Directed by: Jacek Borcuch
- Starring: Borys Szyc; Marianna Zydek; Maja Pankiewicz; Milena Goździela; Ilona Ostrowska; Jakub Wieczorek; Piotr Polak; Jerzy Skolimowski; Marcin Januszkiewicz; Zofia Wichłacz
- Composer: Daniel Bloom
- Country of origin: Poland
- Original language: Polish
- No. of seasons: 1
- No. of episodes: 11

Production
- Executive producers: Andrzej Besztak; Steve Matthews; Antony Root; Johnathan Young
- Producer: Izabela Lopuch
- Cinematography: Piotr Uznański
- Editors: Sebastian Mialik; Przemysław Chruścielewski; Piotr Kmiecik
- Running time: 40–47 minutes
- Production companies: HBO Europe; Magnolia Films

Original release
- Network: SkyShowtime
- Release: 19 June – 21 August 2023

Still Here (Polish: Warszawianka, lit. 'The Varsovian') is a Polish comedy drama television series. It began airing on SkyShowtime on 19 June 2023 as the platform's first original Polish-language series.

== Premise ==
Franek "Czuly" Czułkowski is a 40-year-old playboy who struggles to face reality.

== Cast ==
- Borys Szyc as Franek "Czuly" Czułkowski
- Marianna Zydek as Gryzelda
- Maja Pankiewicz as Ela
- Milena Goździela as Nina
- Ilona Ostrowska as Matylda
- Jakub Wieczorek as Borys "Borygo"
- Piotr Polak as Piotr "Sanczo"
- Jerzy Skolimowski as Stanisław Czułkowski
- Marcin Januszkiewicz as "Ganges"
- Zofia Wichłacz as Zofia Sztajner
- Tomasz Włosok as Janek
- Marta Ścisłowicz as Aleksandra Pazur
- Robert Koszucki as Szymon Szort
- Magda Grąziowska as Marysia
- Agnieszka Doczyńska as Kama
- Krystyna Janda as Maria Czułkowska
- Paulina Gałązka as Agnieszka
- Jadwiga Jankowska-Cieślak as Aunt Marzena
- Jan Peszek as Tadeusz Czepułkowski

== Episodes ==
No.	Title	Duration	Original release date
1	"Episode 1"	41 min	19 June 2023
2	"Episode 2"	41 min	19 June 2023
3	"Episode 3"	43 min	26 June 2023
4	"Episode 4"	45 min	3 July 2023
5	"Episode 5"	41 min	10 July 2023
6	"Episode 6"	40 min	17 July 2023
7	"Episode 7"	42 min	24 July 2023
8	"Episode 8"	41 min	31 July 2023
9	"Episode 9"	40 min	7 August 2023
10	"Episode 10"	45 min	14 August 2023
11	"Episode 11"	47 min	21 August 2023

== Production ==
The series was filmed in Warsaw, with specific filming locations including the Vistulan Boulevards, the Palace of Culture and Science, and Saviour Square.

== Release ==
In January 2023, it was announced that SkyShowtime had acquired Warszawianka from HBO Europe as one of three original series to premiere on the platform.
