= Kasia Stankiewicz =

Polish pop singer (born 1977)

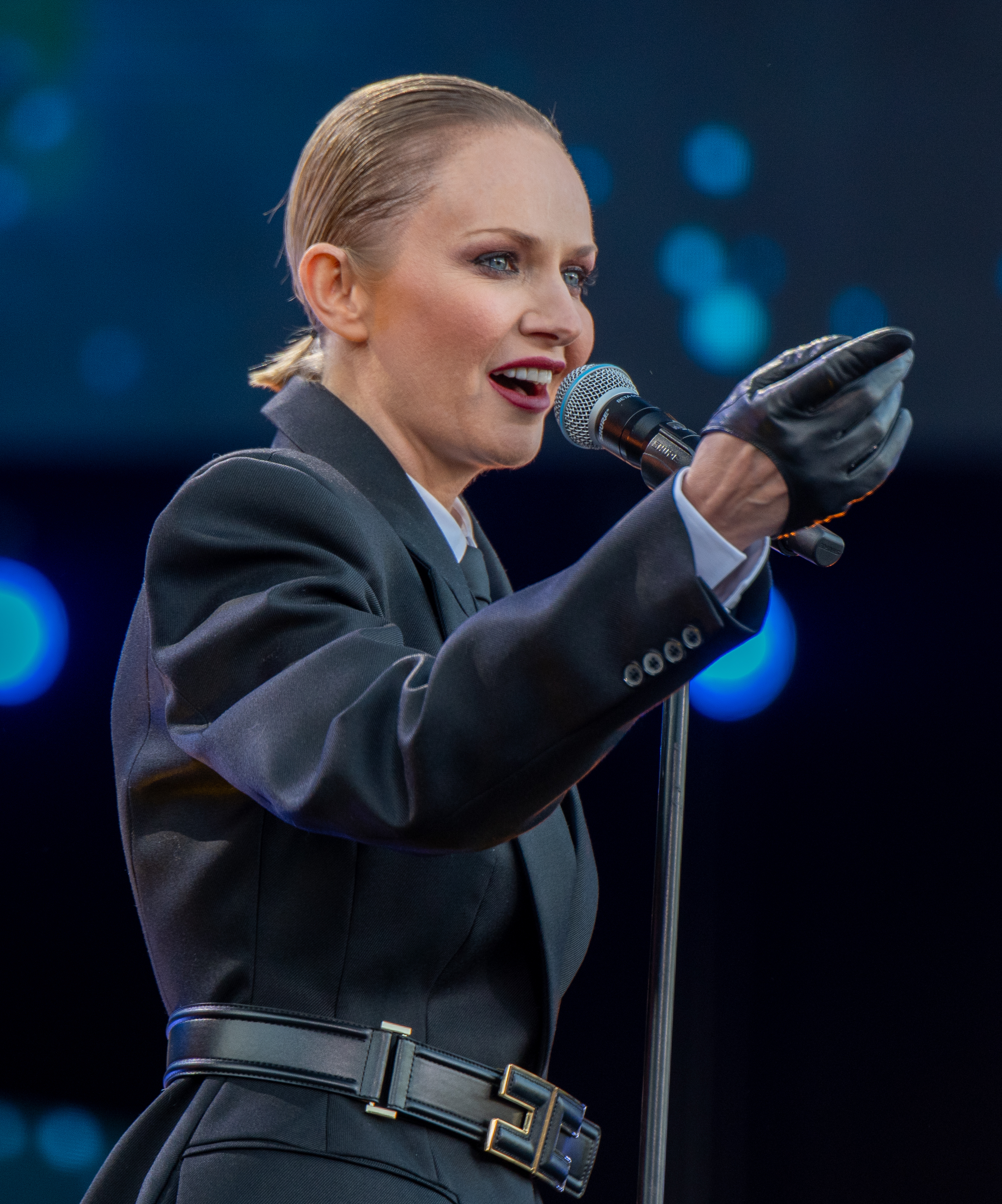
- Kasia Stankiewicz in 2023

Background information
- Born: 2 June 1977 (age 49); Działdowo, Poland
- Genres: Indie pop, pop, pop rock
- Occupation: Singer
- Labels: Zic Zac, BMG Poland, EMI Music Poland, Warner Music Poland
- Member of: Varius Manx

Kasia Maria Stankiewicz (born 2 June 1977, Działdowo, Poland) is a Polish pop singer.

She started her career in 1995 singing a song by Varius Manx, a multi-platinum Polish band, in the TV song contest Szansa na sukces (A Chance for Success).

In 1999 she recorded her first solo album, Kasia Stankiewicz, with soul and jazz compositions. In 2001 Kasia Stankiewicz recorded "The Bridge Song" with the German electronic music group Tangerine Dream. The single promoted their new album around the world. In 2003 she produced and published a new album called Extrapop. The first single "Schyłek lata" (The End of Summer) was a smash hit in Poland, and two other singles "Francuzeczka" (The French Girl) and "Saint Etienne" were successful too. Kasia also left behind her "good girl" image.

In 2006 Stankiewicz released a new album called Mimikra (Mimicry). She released two singles from the album: "4 ręce" (4 Hands) and "Marzec" (March). On the album was also a song called Dla Frycka which Stankiewicz wrote for her first-born son. A third single from the album is "W środku myśli" (In the Center of Thoughts). It was one of the ten chosen songs to take part in the preliminary to the Sopot Music Festival.

During 2008 Kasia Stankiewicz performed and recorded "Baby w Meksyku" on the Te 30 Urodziny (30th Birthday) album of Martyna Jakubowicz along with other artists recordings and two new songs performed by Jakubowicz.

In December 2012, she produced a two-disc re-release of "Extrapop". There is original material on disc 2, and some remixes and the song "Run" for the series "Londoners". Kasia Stankiewicz performed Dancing with balloons in English on TVP Polonia in Poland in 2013 to promote her work.

The album, entitled "Lucy and the Loop" was released in October 2014 by Warner Music Poland. The first single "Lucy" premiered on 22 August 2014. The album was in English, Stankiewicz recorded it in studios in Great Britain, Poland and Iceland. Among the track list of the CD were Lucy, Soul, Up and Dancing With Balloons among others. In 2016 Varius Manx & Kasia Stankiewicz released the 25 live 2-CD album. Varius Manx and Kasia Stankiewicz did a 25th anniversary concert at CKK Jordanki Concert Hall, in 2017 and other notable locations during their jubilee concert tour.

== Discography ==
=== Studio albums ===
Title	Album details	Peak chart positions
Title	Album details	POL
Kasia Stankiewicz	Released: 1999; Label: Zic Zac/BMG Poland; Formats: CD	—
Extrapop	Released: August 22, 2003; Label: Raf/BMG Poland; Formats: CD (+CD), digital download	38
Mimikra	Released: October 20, 2006; Label: EMI Music Poland; Formats: CD, digital download	—
Lucy and the Loop	Released: October 10, 2014; Label: Warner Music Poland; Formats: CD, digital download	33
"—" denotes a recording that did not chart or was not released in that territory.

=== Music videos ===
Title	Year	Directed	Album	Ref.
"Dopiero od jutra"	1999	—	Kasia Stankiewicz	
"Niepewność" (Michał Żebrowski with Kasia Stankiewicz)	2002	—	Lubię, kiedy kobieta	
"Schyłek lata"	2003	Karolina Bendera	Extrapop	
"Francuzeczka"	2003	Joanna Rechnio	Extrapop	
"Saint Etienne"	2003	Joanna Rechnio	Extrapop	
"Marzec"	2006	—	Mimikra	
"4 Ręce"	2006	Joanna Rechnio	Mimikra	
"W środku myśli"	2007	Grupa 13	Mimikra	
"Lucy"	2014	—	Lucy and the Loop	
