= Indecent Songs =

Album by Anita Lipnicka and John Porter

Indecent Songs is an album released by a Polish-Welsh duo Anita Lipnicka and John Porter. In Poland, the album is known as Nieprzyzwoite piosenki. Although released on the Polish market, the album is all in English. All songs were written by Lipnicka and Porter.

== Release and reception ==
The album was released on 20 November 2003. The album was released by POMATON EMI. It was promoted by the song Bones of Love. The album is a collection of ballads about love and life, accompanied by Porter's guitar, as well as the sound of violin, piano, mandolin and accordion.

"Bones of Love" reached number one in almost all of the charts. The video to this song was nominated for The Yach Video Award in three categories: Viewer's Choice, Best Mont age and The Video Of The Year.74 It also appeared on the complication All The Stories (2006) and its live version appeared on a mini-disc Other Stories (2006).

The album was a critical success in Poland. It became platinum, and Lipnicka and Porter received the most important Polish music award for their album - the Fryderyk for The Pop Album Of The Year in 2003.

== Track listing ==
1. Bones of Love (3:01)
2. Beggar's Song (5:12)
3. Heaven Knows Why (3:32)
4. Then & Now (3:48)
5. Rose (2:45)
6. Everything Flows (4:57)
7. Learning (How to Fall) (4:40)
8. Cry (4:32)
9. Way Back to Love (4:28)
10. Cruel Magic (3:42)
11. Nobody Else (5:00)
12. Knock, Knock (4:46)
13. Strange Bird (4:27)
14. Sweet Jesus (3:44)
