= Ilona Ostrowska =

Polish actress (born 1974)

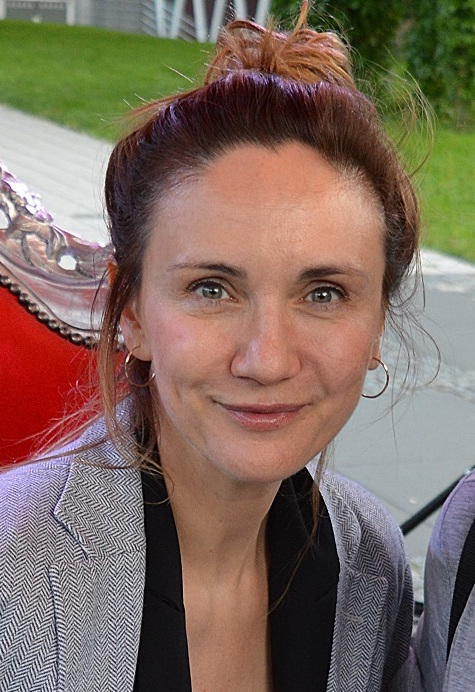
- Ostrowska in 2019
- Born: Ilona Ostrowska; 25 May 1974 (age 52); Szczecin, Poland
- Occupations: film actor, stage actor
- Years active: 1998–present

Ilona Ostrowska (born 25 May 1974) is a Polish actress.

In 1998 she graduated from the State Theatre School in Wrocław. She worked in Wrocław, Polish Theatre and the Theatre of K2. Since 2002 is an actress Contemporary Theatre in Warsaw. In 2004 she married actor and director Jacek Borcuch (divorce in 2012). In 2006 she gave birth to a daughter Miłosława. Popularity earned her the role of Lucy, a Polish-American in the series Ranczo by Wojciech Adamczyk. Her father was a sailor, and her mother was a housewife.

== Theatrical roles in Contemporary Theater ==
- 2001: Imię, as Sister
- 2001: Bambini di Praga, as Nadzia
- 2003: Stracone zachody miłości, as Żankietta
- 2004: Nieznajoma z Sekwany, as Irena
- 2004: Pielęgniarki z nocnej zmiany

== Roles in the TV Theater ==
- 1998: Prawiek i inne czasy, as Adelka
- 1999: Historia PRL według Mrożka, as Journalist
- 2001: Przemiana 1999, as Journalist
- 2001: Siedem dalekich rejsów, as Anita

== Filmography ==
- 1998: Życie jak poker, as Magda
- 2000: M jak miłość
- 2000: Sezon na leszcza
- 2001: Głośniej od bomb, as Magda
- 2001: Silence
- 2002: Dzień świra
- 2003: Marcinelle, as Mogile Ernesto
- 2003: Na Wspólnej, as Owner of a car purchased by Leszek Nowak
- 2004: Tulipany, as Ola
- 2004: Długi weekend, as Wife of member
- 2006-2016: Ranczo, as Lucy Wilska
- 2007: Ranczo Wilkowyje, as Lucy Wilska
- 2008: Ile waży koń trojański?, as Zosia
- 2009: Droga do raju, as Ela
- 2009: Naznaczony, as Attorney
- 2010: Kołysanka as a reporter
- 2023: Warszawianka as Matylda
