= The Ranch (2006 TV series) =

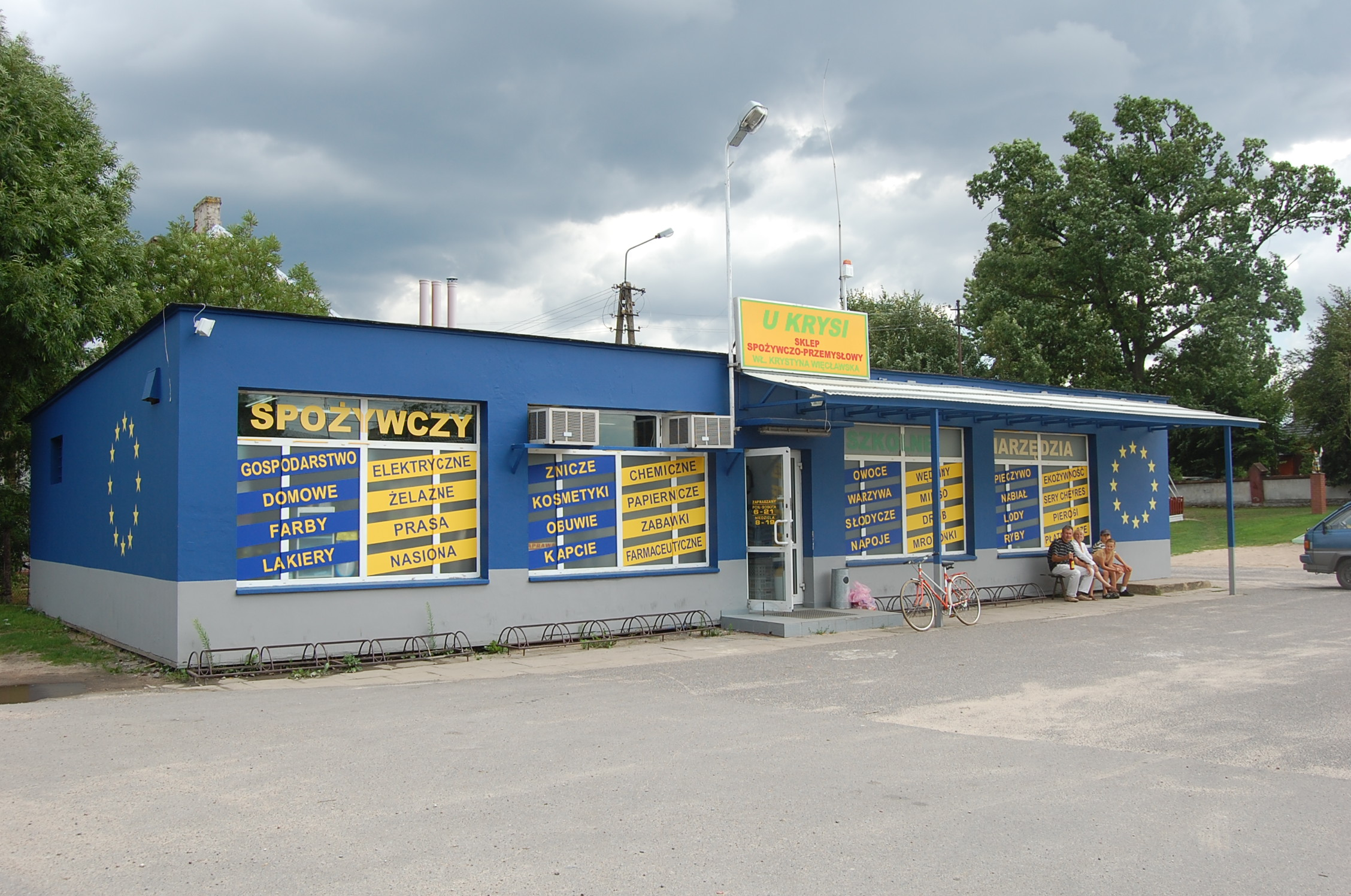
- Krystyna Więcławska's shop in Wilkowyje
- Genre: Comedy
- Created by: Wojciech Adamczyk
- Written by: Robert Brutter; Jerzy Niemczuk
- Starring: Ilona Ostrowska; Paweł Królikowski; Cezary Żak; Artur Barciś; Violetta Arlak; Grzegorz Wons; Bogdan Kalus; Piotr Pręgowski; Sylwester Maciejewski; Leon Niemczyk
- Composers: Krzesimir Dębski; Radzimir Dębski
- Country of origin: Poland
- Original language: Polish
- No. of seasons: 10
- No. of episodes: 130

Production
- Production locations: Jeruzal, Latowicz, Sokule
- Running time: 42–53 minutes
- Production company: Studio A (ATM Grupa)

Original release
- Network: TVP1
- Release: March 5, 2006 – present

The Ranch (Polish: Ranczo) is a Polish television series that originally aired in 10 season from March 25, 2006 to November 27, 2016 on TVP1. An 11th season is being produced. The series follows the story of Lucy Wilska, a Polish-American who has inherited her great grandmother's country home in the fictional small village of Wilkowyje. She arrives in Wilkowyje with intent to sell the cottage but, after seeing the charm of the village, she decides to stay.

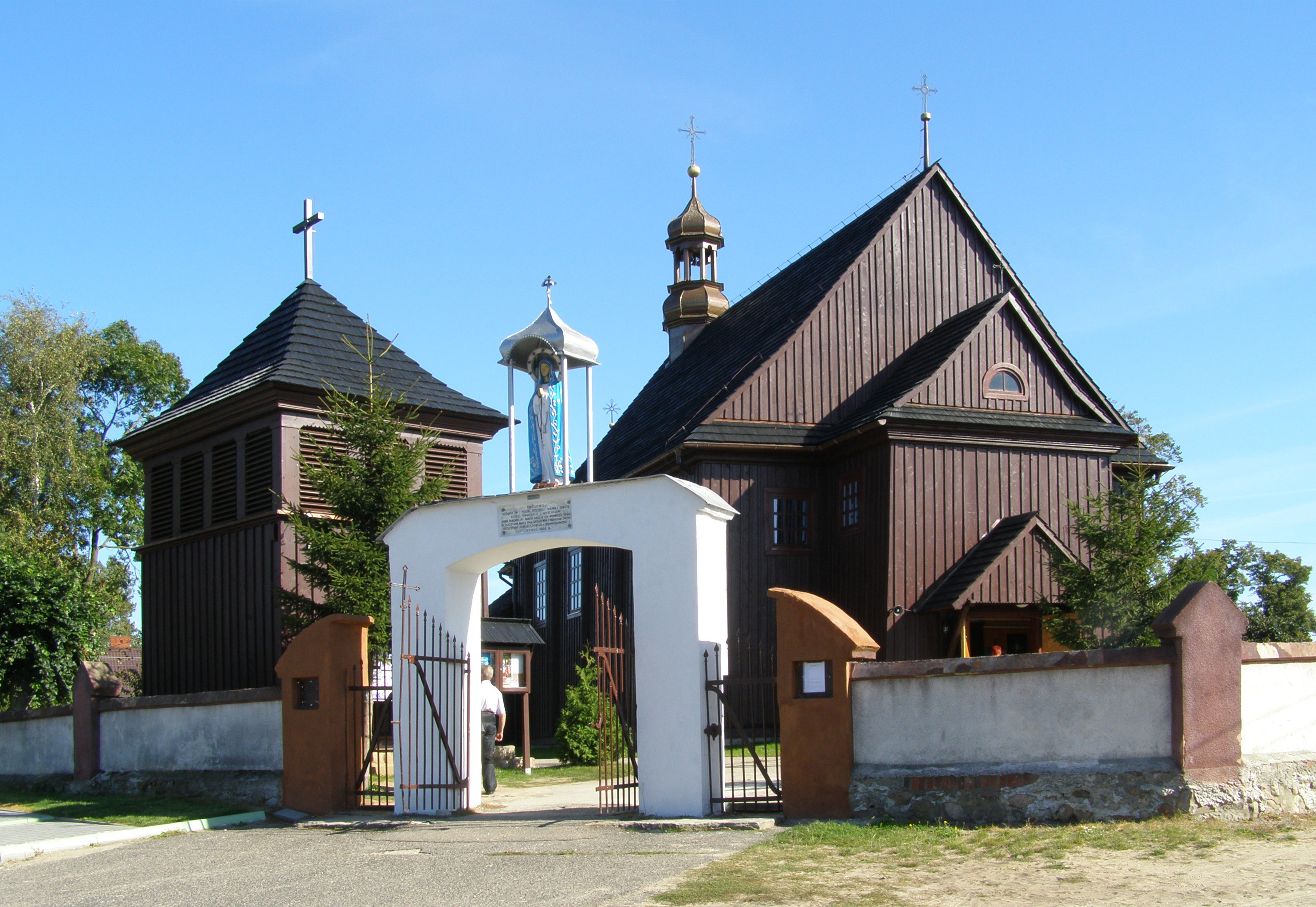
The church in real village of Jeruzal which appears regularly in the show

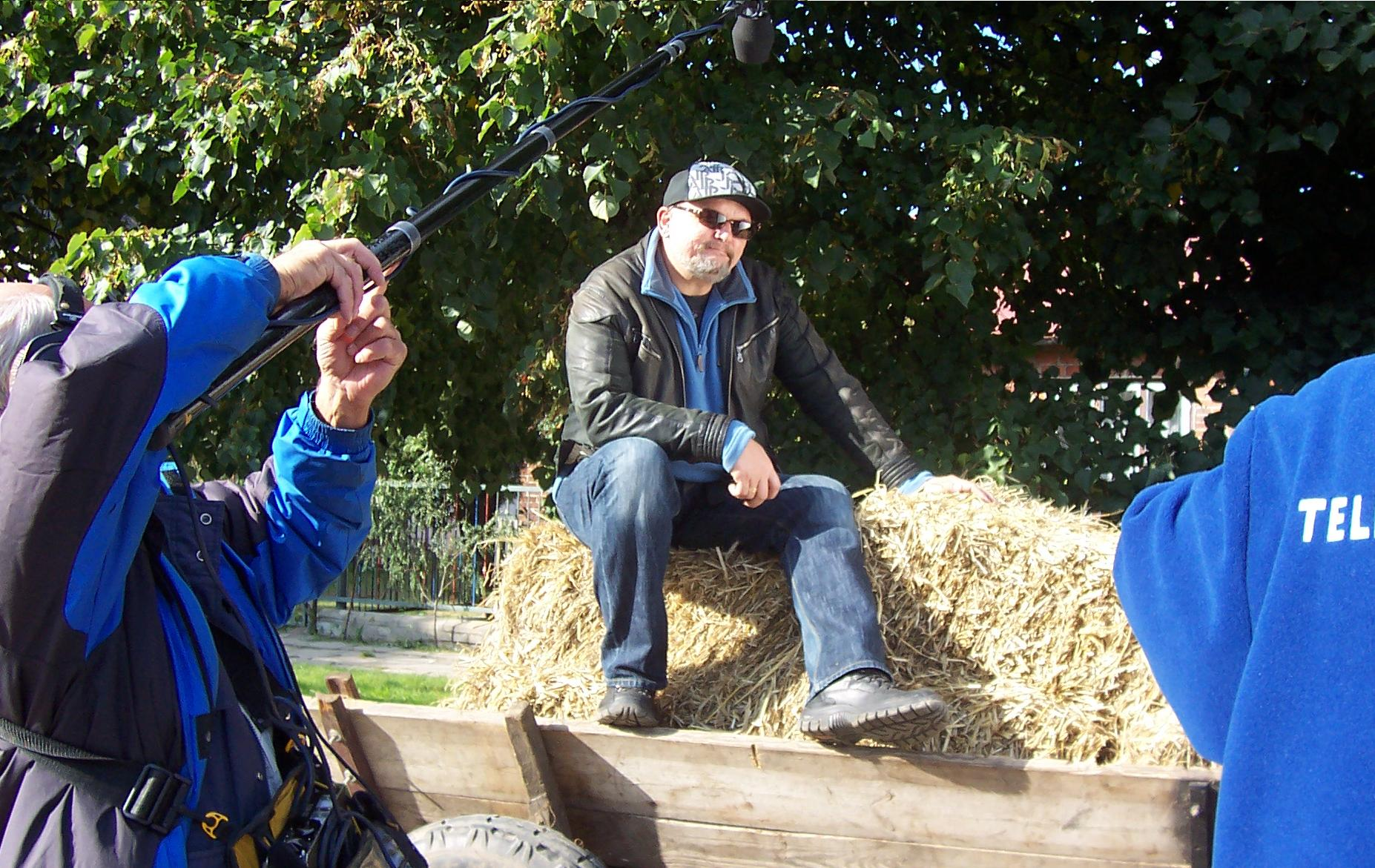
Wojciech Adamczyk on the set of Ranczo

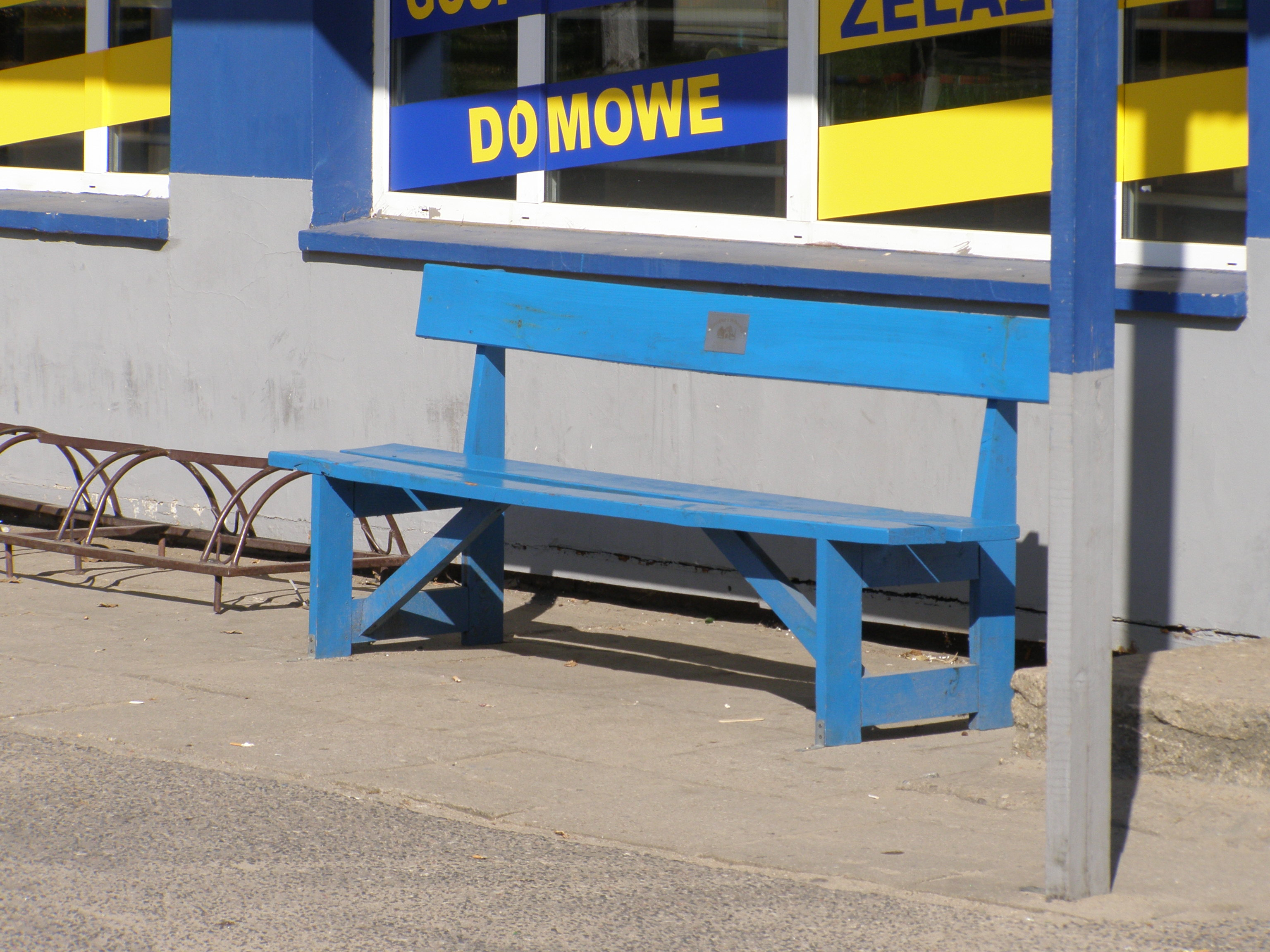
The famous bench where Solejuk, Hadziuk, Pietrek and Jan Japycz used to sit

== Characters ==
Lucy Wilska – an American of Polish descent, who inherits her grandmother's manor house in a small village Wilkowyje in eastern Poland. She's optimistic, honest, kind and brave in willing to act to improve the world around her. She befriends Kusy, who lives in a cottage next to her house and the two soon start a relationship. In Season 4 they married and have a daughter, Dorotka. She works as an English teacher in early seasons. From Season 4 to 9 she serves as the mayor of the town. After leaving the office she temporarily returns to the United States and returns to Poland in the last episode.

Jakub "Kusy" Sokołowski – a former famous abstract painter, who went through a breakdown and fell into alcoholism after the death of his first wife. Early in the series, he lives in a cottage next to Lucy's manor and helps her in its renovation. He soon fells in love with Lucy but doesn't believe himself to be worthy of her and even rejects her when she confesses she's in love with him as well. For a short time he dates Violetka. He and Lucy become a couple in Season 3 and marry in Season 4. Under Lucy's influence, Kusy quits drinking and paints again, which no one in the town understands. He pursues an artist career in later seasons with help of an art agent Monika. He's smart, highly educated and brave - in one episode he organizes the whole town's defense against the mob. He's also emotional and chivalrous, more than once getting violent in defence of Lucy and her good name. His real name wasn't revealed until Season 4 and everyone in town refers to him as "Kusy". Lucy herself didn't find out his real name until the day of their wedding, and even after that she still always calls him "Kusy".

Piotr Kozioł – the parish priest of Wilkowyje's Roman Catholic Church and twin brother of Mayor Paweł Koziol. Unlike his brother, he is respected and has friendly relations with most people in the village. Most of the time he's kind, well-meaning, and cares for the public good, but to some extent also shares his brother's greedy and impetuous personality often getting in power and influence struggles with the Mayor. An example from the first season includes both the Priest and the Mayor fighting for control over the only local newspaper, each trying to censor it and use it as his own propaganda tool. The two brothers are adversaries, but occasionally work together to achieve a common goal. They make a few attempts to reconcile, which they finally do in the finale of Season 4, but they still have many disagreements afterwards. Priest Kozioł quickly gets in friendly relations with Lucy and often supports her in her initiatives, but sometimes finds himself at odds with her progressive ideas. In the Season 8 finale he becomes an auxiliary bishop of the Archdiocese of Lublin.

Paweł Kozioł – the mayor of Wilkowyje and, especially in early seasons, antagonist to his twin brother, priest Piotr Kozioł and to Lucy. He's corrupt, dishonest and incompetent in office and cares mostly about his personal interests, often resorting to blackmail, threats and power abuse to achieve his goals. He's also impetuous, often screaming at others and often even threatening people with a hatchet (he keeps one at his office especially for that purpose). In the first season he tries to make life difficult for Lucy in numerous ways in hope of making her leave the town, as he intended to buy her house for his daughter Klaudia (who is not at all interested in it). That includes sending hired drunks to scare Lucy off at night (whom she easily dispatches by shooting blanks at them), spreading supposedly compromising rumours about her, blocking Lucy's employment at the local school and bribing the construction crew into trying to convince Lucy that the house is haunted. All of that fails, however, and later the Mayor gives up. In Season 4 he is not reelected, while Lucy is elected as the new mayor of Wilkowyje. However, in Season 5 he revives his political career by winning a by-election for a place in the Senate and starting his own political party - Polish Party of Honesty - together with Arkadiusz Czerepach, his former secretary. He quickly becomes famous after being caught on TV completely drunk his first day in the Senate. Due to his own and Czerepach's manipulations and propaganda and his incompetence, his vulgarity is often mistaken for eccentricity and a sign of protest against the establishment (an homage by the show to the character of Nikodem Dyzma, a popular figure of Polish literature and TV - an uneducated simpleton who starts a successful political career by a series of misunderstandings). In last episode of the show, he is elected as the new President of Poland. Just before the elections, he is frightened by the office's responsibility and decides to take his new role seriously, rather than just another means to achieve his personal goals.

Michałowa – The rectory's housekeeper. She eavesdrops and selects the priest's guests. Her husband's name was Michał and she is called "Michałowa", but her present husband is Stach Japycz. Michałowa is honest, uncompromising and moody. She always says what she thinks.

Zofia Stec "Babka" – A herbalist. She has supernatural abilities. Babka lives in a small cottage near the forest. She was Lucy's grandmother's friend and also helps Lucy.

Arkadiusz Czerepach - a high-ranking official in the administration of Mayor Kozioł. His official position is the town's secretary, and he is the second in command in Kozioł's office. He's much better educated than Kozioł, but in early seasons remains psychopathic towards the Mayor, while sometimes also working against him behind his back. Czerepach himself is also very cunning, ambitious, manipulative, and - especially in early seasons - ruthless and untrustworthy. At the end and season 1 Czerepach drunkenly brags to Mayor Kozioł about how he successfully manipulates both him, and his brother Priest Kozioł, after which the Mayor angrily chases him around the town with a hatchet. In season two Czerepach comes up with the idea of collecting documents containing "dirt" on everyone in town. The Mayor initially approves, but changes his mind when he discovers Czerepach started to collect incriminating information about him as well. As a result the Mayor arranges for Czerepach to take a course for officials in Brussels just to get rid of him. Czerepach gets back in season 3 with a large sum of money and intends to get his revenge on the Mayor. He is forced to leave Wilkowyje again, when a woman from Brussels arrives, revealing that he seduced her and stole her money while posing under the name of Paweł Kozioł. He gets back again in season 4, this time promising the Mayor help to get him reelected in the upcoming election. Hesitantly, Kozioł agrees, and hires Czerepach as the Deputy Mayor. During the election campaign Czerepach truly reveals himself to be a highly talented spin-doctor and political player, however Mayor still loses the election to Lucy, despite Czerepach's aggressive slander campaigning against her. To prove the Mayor his ability of manipulating people, Czerepach seduces Leokadia Paciorek, the Mayor's office chief accountant. They become a couple, but when Leokadia discovers that he used her she breaks up with him, only for Czerepach to realize that he's in love with her. She eventually forgives him and they get married off-screen between season 4 and 5. His new wife initially forbids him to get involved in politics and Czerepach gets a job outside it, but after some time he convinces Leokadia that his talents are wasted there and she allows him to work with Mayor again on his electoral campaign for the place in the Senate. Czerepach advises the new senator on his political moves, helping him to gain a huge popularity and found their own political party. In season 8 he becomes a member of parliament and a deputy prime minister of Poland. In the last season he runs Kozioł's electoral campaigning for presidency.

Leokadia Czerepach – Chief accountant. Honest and frightened. She has fallen in love with Czerepach and they have married.

Kazimiera Solejukowa – She was a poor woman. Solejukowa lived with her alcoholic husband and their seven children in a cottage near the forest, but she became friends with Hadziukowa and Więcławska and then earned a lot of money. The Solejuk family built a new house. Solejukowa went on a university. She speaks English, German, Italian and French.

Maciej Solejuk – Solejukowa's husband.

Celina Hadziukowa – the owner of the herd of goats, Hadziuk's wife.

Tadeusz Hadziuk – Hadziukowa's husband.

Jolanta "Jola" Pietrek – Pietrek's wife. They have twin sons.

Patryk Pietrek – a singer, Jola's husband.

Stanisław "Stach" Japycz – Michałowa's husband.

Halina Kozioł – Paweł's wife. She knows about all of her husband's schemes.

Wiesława Oleś – The headmistress.

Krystyna Więcławska – The owner of the only shop in the village.

Mieczysław Wezół – The only doctor in Wilkowyje. He is afraid of his wife.

Dorota Wezół – The doctor's wife. She is elegant and spontaneous and is jealous of her husband.

Dorota "Dorotka" Sokołowska – She is Lucy and Kusy's little daughter.

Kinga – Grażyna's daughter. At the beginning Lucy and Kusy could not get along with her, but they later found a common language.

Tomasz Witebski – Polish teacher at the local school, the editor of the local press, radio and television and a writer. He fallen in love with Francesca and they have married.

Francesca – Italian police officer, came to Wilkowyje, within the framework of the EU Exchange. She stayed in Poland and married to Tomasz Witebski. They have a baby.

Violetta "Violetka" – a barmaid, Stasiek's wife. They have got a daughter.

Stanisław Kotecki – a policeman, Violetka's husband.

Monika Korczab – Art agent, fascinated by Kusy's paintings.

Ola – Journalist and Czerepach's assistant.

Weronika Więcławska-Tao – daughter of Krystyna and Andrzej Więcławski.

Jerry Smith – employee of the American Embassy, in love with Lucy without reciprocity. Then he fell in love with Monika.

Jagna Nowak – a nurse.

Grażyna – Kinga's mother.

Wojciech Ostecki – a policeman.

Wacław Sądecki – a bishop.

Wargacz – Solejuk's neighbour.

Wargaczowa – Wargacz's wife.

Myćko – Wargacz's friend.

Weronka – a shop assistant.

Roman – an accountant.

Jakub – Kinga's boyfriend.

Ryszard Polakowski - village pharmacist.

== Cast ==
- Ilona Ostrowska as Lucy Wilska
- Paweł Królikowski as Jakub "Kusy" Sokołowski
- Cezary Żak as Piotr Kozioł
- Paweł Kozioł
- Violetta Arlak as Halina Kozioł
- Bartosz Kasprzykowski as Robert, priest
- Jacek Kawalec as Tomasz Witebski
- Marta Chodorowska as Klaudia Kozioł
- Bogdan Kalus as Tadeusz Hadziuk
- Dorota Nowakowska as Celina Hadziuk
- Piotr Pręgowski as Patryk Pietrek
- Leon Niemczyk as Jan Japycz
- Franciszek Pieczka as Stanisław "Stach" Japycz
- Sylwester Maciejewski as Maciej Solejuk
- Katarzyna Żak as Kazimiera Solejuk
- Marta Lipińska as Michałowa
- Grzegorz Wons as Andrzej Więcławski
- Dorota Chotecka as Krystyna Więcławska
- Sylwia Gliwa as Weronika Więcławska-Tao
- Artur Barciś as Arkadiusz Czerepach
- Piotr Ligienza as Fabian Duda
- Magdalena Kuta as Leokadia Paciorek
- Wojciech Wysocki as Mieczysław Wezół, doctor
- Beata Olga Kowalska as Dorota Wezół
- Arkadiusz Nader as Stasiek Kotecki, policeman
- Marcin Kwaśny as Mroczek
- Magdalena Waligórska as Wioletka, barmaid
- Ewa Kuryło as Wiesława Oleś, headmistress
- Elżbieta Romanowska as Jola
- Grażyna Zielińska as Babka
- Kim Nam Kyun as Kao Tao
- Jędrzej Cempura as Marianek Solejuk
- Maciej Cempura as Szymek Solejuk
- Eugenia Herman as The aunt of the mayor and the priest
- Wiktor Zborowski as Wacław Sądecki, the bishop
- Leon Charewicz as Ryszard Polakowski, the pharmacist
- Emilia Komarnicka - Klynstra as Monika Kurczab, Kusy's agent

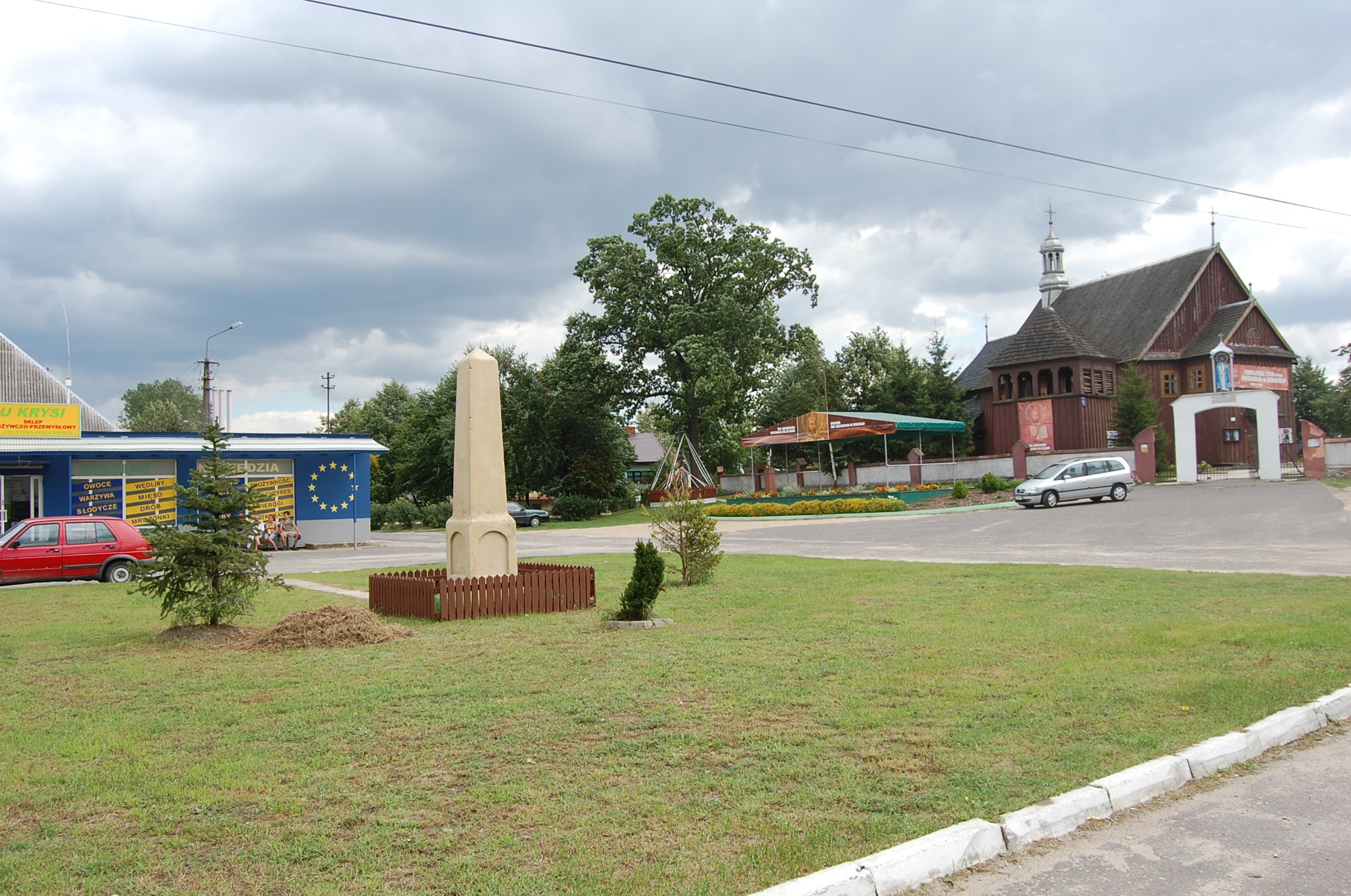
The market square in Jeruzal, which in the series is a central location.

== Production ==
=== Location ===
Ranczo is set in the fictional small town of Wilkowyje, located near Radzyń Podlaski. The show is mainly filmed in Jeruzal, with scenes involving the exterior of one of the homes shot at a cottage located in Sokule.

=== Seasons ===
To date, the series has run for ten seasons. It was originally planned to end production in 2009, and the producers also tried to end the show in 2014, but due to its popularity, the programme kept being extended.

=== Production ===
Ranczo is produced by Studio A, part of ATM Grupa.

=== Reception ===
Ranczo was awarded the Telekamery Award for "Best Comedy Series" in 2009 and the Super Telekamery Award.

== Episodes ==
=== Season 1 (2006) ===
No. overall	No. in series	Title	Directed by	Written by	Original release date
1	1	"Spadek (The legacy)"	Wojciech Adamczyk	Robert Brutter & Jerzy Niemczuk	5 March 2006
2	2	"Goście z zaświatów (Guests from the beyond)"	Wojciech Adamczyk	Robert Brutter & Jerzy Niemczuk	12 March 2006
3	3	"Ksiądz z inicjatywą (The priest takes the initiative)"	Wojciech Adamczyk	Robert Brutter & Jerzy Niemczuk	19 March 2006
4	4	"Otrzeźwienie (To sober up)"	Wojciech Adamczyk	Robert Brutter & Jerzy Niemczuk	26 March 2006
5	5	"Wieść gminna (Municipal News)"	Wojciech Adamczyk	Robert Brutter & Jerzy Niemczuk	9 April 2006
6	6	"Racja gminy (The right of the commune)"	Wojciech Adamczyk	Robert Brutter & Jerzy Niemczuk	23 April 2006
7	7	"Podwójny agent (The double agent)"	Wojciech Adamczyk	Robert Brutter & Jerzy Niemczuk	30 April 2006
8	8	"Kozy ofiarne (Scapegoats)"	Wojciech Adamczyk	Robert Brutter & Jerzy Niemczuk	7 May 2006
9	9	"Odwyk i antykoncepcja (The rehab and the contraception)"	Wojciech Adamczyk	Robert Brutter & Jerzy Niemczuk	7 May 2006
10	10	"Porwanie (The kidnapping)"	Wojciech Adamczyk	Robert Brutter & Jerzy Niemczuk	14 May 2006
11	11	"Wspólny wróg (The common enemy)"	Wojciech Adamczyk	Robert Brutter & Jerzy Niemczuk	14 May 2006
12	12	"Honor gminy (The honor of the commune)"	Wojciech Adamczyk	Robert Brutter & Jerzy Niemczuk	21 May 2006
13	13	"Wielkie wybory (Great elections)"	Wojciech Adamczyk	Robert Brutter & Jerzy Niemczuk	21 May 2006

=== Season 2 (2007) ===
No. overall	No. in series	Title	Directed by	Written by	Original release date
14	1	"Sztuka i władza (The art and the authority)"	Wojciech Adamczyk	Robert Brutter & Jerzy Niemczuk	18 March 2007
15	2	"Gmina to ja (I am the community)"	Wojciech Adamczyk	Robert Brutter & Jerzy Niemczuk	25 March 2007
16	3	"Lokalna rewolucja (The local revolution)"	Wojciech Adamczyk	Robert Brutter & Jerzy Niemczuk	1 April 2007
17	4	"Honor parafii (The honor of the parish)"	Wojciech Adamczyk	Robert Brutter & Jerzy Niemczuk	15 April 2007
18	5	"Europejski kandydat (The european candidate)"	Wojciech Adamczyk	Robert Brutter & Jerzy Niemczuk	22 April 2007
19	6	"Rozwód z miłości (The divorce for love)"	Wojciech Adamczyk	Robert Brutter & Jerzy Niemczuk	29 April 2007
20	7	"Diabelskie porachunki (Devilish accounts)"	Wojciech Adamczyk	Robert Brutter & Jerzy Niemczuk	6 May 2007
21	8	"Jesienna burza (The autumn storm)"	Wojciech Adamczyk	Robert Brutter & Jerzy Niemczuk	13 May 2007
22	9	"Diler pierogów (The dumplings dealer)"	Wojciech Adamczyk	Robert Brutter & Jerzy Niemczuk	20 May 2007
23	10	"Do dobrego lepiej przymusić (It is better to force good)"	Wojciech Adamczyk	Robert Brutter & Jerzy Niemczuk	27 May 2007
24	11	"Siła władzy (The power of the authority)"	Wojciech Adamczyk	Robert Brutter & Jerzy Niemczuk	3 June 2007
25	12	"Plan awaryjny (The emergency plan)"	Wojciech Adamczyk	Robert Brutter & Jerzy Niemczuk	10 June 2007
26	13	"Zgoda po polsku (The agreement in Polish)"	Wojciech Adamczyk	Robert Brutter & Jerzy Niemczuk	17 June 2007

=== Season 3 (2008) ===
No. overall	No. in series	Title	Directed by	Written by	Original release date
27	1	"Płomień duży i mały (A big and a small flame)"	Wojciech Adamczyk	Robert Brutter & Jerzy Niemczuk	9 March 2008
28	2	"Powrót demona (The return of the demon)"	Wojciech Adamczyk	Robert Brutter & Jerzy Niemczuk	16 March 2008
29	3	"W kleszczach terroryzmu (In the grip of terrorism)"	Wojciech Adamczyk	Robert Brutter & Jerzy Niemczuk	23 March 2008
30	4	"Fakt prasowy (The press fact)"	Wojciech Adamczyk	Robert Brutter & Jerzy Niemczuk	30 March 2008
31	5	"Radio interaktywne (The interactive radio)"	Wojciech Adamczyk	Robert Brutter & Jerzy Niemczuk	6 April 2008
32	6	"Wielkie odkrycie (The great discovery)"	Wojciech Adamczyk	Robert Brutter & Jerzy Niemczuk	13 April 2008
33	7	"Sprawca (The culprit)"	Wojciech Adamczyk	Robert Brutter & Jerzy Niemczuk	20 April 2008
34	8	"Odsiecz (The succor)"	Wojciech Adamczyk	Robert Brutter & Jerzy Niemczuk	27 April 2008
35	9	"Upadek obyczajów (The fall of morals)"	Wojciech Adamczyk	Robert Brutter & Jerzy Niemczuk	4 May 2008
36	10	"Miedź brzęcząca (The sounding brass)"	Wojciech Adamczyk	Robert Brutter & Jerzy Niemczuk	11 May 2008
37	11	"Zrozumieć kobietę (To understand a woman)"	Wojciech Adamczyk	Robert Brutter & Jerzy Niemczuk	18 May 2008
38	12	"Złoty deszcz (The golden rain)"	Wojciech Adamczyk	Robert Brutter & Jerzy Niemczuk	25 May 2008
39	13	"Szczęśliwe rozwiązanie (The fortunate solution)"	Wojciech Adamczyk	Robert Brutter & Jerzy Niemczuk	2 June 2008

=== Season 4 (2009) ===
No. overall	No. in series	Title	Directed by	Written by	Original release date
40	1	"Szok poporodowy (The postpartum shock)"	Wojciech Adamczyk	Robert Brutter & Jerzy Niemczuk	31 December 2008
41	2	"Sztormy emocjonalne (Emotional storms)"	Wojciech Adamczyk	Robert Brutter & Jerzy Niemczuk	8 March 2009
42	3	"Śluby i rozstania (Weddings and partings)"	Wojciech Adamczyk	Robert Brutter & Jerzy Niemczuk	15 March 2009
43	4	"Agent (Agent)"	Wojciech Adamczyk	Robert Brutter & Jerzy Niemczuk	22 March 2009
44	5	"Polityka i czary (The politics and the witchcraft)"	Wojciech Adamczyk	Robert Brutter & Jerzy Niemczuk	29 March 2009
45	6	"Wymiana międzypokoleniowa (The intergenerational exchange)"	Wojciech Adamczyk	Robert Brutter & Jerzy Niemczuk	5 April 2009
46	7	"Dzieci śmieci (Children and rubbish)"	Wojciech Adamczyk	Robert Brutter & Jerzy Niemczuk	12 April 2009
47	8	"W samo popołudnie (Punctually in the afternoon)"	Wojciech Adamczyk	Robert Brutter & Jerzy Niemczuk	19 April 2009
48	9	"Bohaterski strajk (The heroic strike)"	Wojciech Adamczyk	Robert Brutter & Jerzy Niemczuk	26 April 2009
49	10	"Debata (The debate)"	Wojciech Adamczyk	Robert Brutter & Jerzy Niemczuk	3 May 2009
50	11	"Kontratak (The counterattack)"	Wojciech Adamczyk	Robert Brutter & Jerzy Niemczuk	10 May 2009
51	12	"Fałszerze uczuć (The falsifiers of feelings)"	Wojciech Adamczyk	Robert Brutter & Jerzy Niemczuk	17 May 2009
52	13	"Zemsta i wybaczenie (The revenge and the forgiveness)"	Wojciech Adamczyk	Robert Brutter & Jerzy Niemczuk	24 May 2009

=== Season 5 (2011) ===
No. overall	No. in series	Title	Directed by	Written by	Original release date
53	1	"Msza obywatelska (The civic mass)"	Wojciech Adamczyk	Robert Brutter & Jerzy Niemczuk	6 March 2011
54	2	"Czysty biznes (The pure business)"	Wojciech Adamczyk	Robert Brutter & Jerzy Niemczuk	13 March 2011
55	3	"Wielki powrót (The great return)"	Wojciech Adamczyk	Robert Brutter & Jerzy Niemczuk	20 March 2011
56	4	"Amerykańska baza (The american base)"	Wojciech Adamczyk	Robert Brutter & Jerzy Niemczuk	27 March 2011
57	5	"Człowiek z RIO (A man from RIO)"	Wojciech Adamczyk	Robert Brutter & Jerzy Niemczuk	3 April 2011
58	6	"Obcy krajowcy (Foreign and domestic)"	Wojciech Adamczyk	Robert Brutter & Jerzy Niemczuk	17 April 2011
59	7	"Doktor Wezół (Dr. Wezół)"	Wojciech Adamczyk	Robert Brutter & Jerzy Niemczuk	24 April 2011
60	8	"Włoski rozłącznik (The italian breaker)"	Wojciech Adamczyk	Robert Brutter & Jerzy Niemczuk	1 May 2011
61	9	"Honor i zęby trzonowe (The honor and the molar teeth)"	Wojciech Adamczyk	Robert Brutter & Jerzy Niemczuk	8 May 2011
62	10	"Przymus rekreacji (The compulsion of the recreation)"	Wojciech Adamczyk	Robert Brutter & Jerzy Niemczuk	15 May 2011
63	11	"Przewroty kopernikańskie (The Copernican revolution)"	Wojciech Adamczyk	Robert Brutter & Jerzy Niemczuk	22 May 2011
64	12	"Nad Solejuków i Wargaczów domem (Above the house of Solejuk and Wargacz)"	Wojciech Adamczyk	Robert Brutter & Jerzy Niemczuk	29 May 2011
65	13	"Pakt z czartem (The pact with the devil)"	Wojciech Adamczyk	Robert Brutter & Jerzy Niemczuk	5 June 2011

=== Season 6 (2012) ===
No. overall	No. in series	Title	Directed by	Written by	Original release date
66	1	"Szlifierze diamentów (The diamond cutters)"	Wojciech Adamczyk	Robert Brutter & Jerzy Niemczuk	4 March 2012
67	2	"Kozi róg (The corner)"	Wojciech Adamczyk	Robert Brutter & Jerzy Niemczuk	11 March 2012
68	3	"Narracja negacji (The narrative of negation)"	Wojciech Adamczyk	Robert Brutter & Jerzy Niemczuk	18 March 2012
69	4	"Wiatr w żaglach (The wind in sails)"	Wojciech Adamczyk	Robert Brutter & Jerzy Niemczuk	25 March 2012
70	5	"Seks nocy letniej (Summer night sex)"	Wojciech Adamczyk	Robert Brutter & Jerzy Niemczuk	1 April 2012
71	6	"Dzieci rewolucji (Children of the revolution)"	Wojciech Adamczyk	Robert Brutter & Jerzy Niemczuk	8 April 2012
72	7	"Przeciek kontrolowany (The controlled leakage)"	Wojciech Adamczyk	Robert Brutter & Jerzy Niemczuk	15 April 2012
73	8	"Świadek koronny (The king's witness)"	Wojciech Adamczyk	Robert Brutter & Jerzy Niemczuk	22 April 2012
74	9	"Sztuka translacji (The art of the translation)"	Wojciech Adamczyk	Robert Brutter & Jerzy Niemczuk	29 April 2012
75	10	"Kontrrewolucja (The counterrevolution)"	Wojciech Adamczyk	Robert Brutter & Jerzy Niemczuk	6 May 2012
76	11	"Tchnienie Las Vegas (The breath of Las Vegas)"	Wojciech Adamczyk	Robert Brutter & Jerzy Niemczuk	13 May 2012
77	12	"Przywódce (With vodka)"	Wojciech Adamczyk	Robert Brutter & Jerzy Niemczuk	20 May 2012
78	13	"Poród amatorski (The amateur delivery)"	Wojciech Adamczyk	Robert Brutter & Jerzy Niemczuk	27 May 2012

=== Season 7 (2013) ===
No. overall	No. in series	Title	Directed by	Written by	Original release date
79	1	"Wielbicielka z Warszawy (The admirer from Warsaw)"	Wojciech Adamczyk	Robert Brutter	3 March 2013
80	2	"Potęga immunitetu (The power of immunity)"	Wojciech Adamczyk	Robert Brutter	10 March 2013
81	3	"Podróż w czasie (The time travel)"	Wojciech Adamczyk	Robert Brutter	17 March 2013
82	4	"Tchnienie antyklerykalizmu (A breath of anti-clericalism)"	Wojciech Adamczyk	Robert Brutter	24 March 2013
83	5	"Model życia artysty (The artist's life model)"	Wojciech Adamczyk	Robert Brutter	31 March 2013
84	6	"Słowa senatora (Senator Words)"	Wojciech Adamczyk	Robert Brutter	7 April 2013
85	7	"Pojedynek czarownic (The witches' duel)"	Wojciech Adamczyk	Robert Brutter	14 April 2013
86	8	"Droga na szczyt (The way to the top)"	Wojciech Adamczyk	Robert Brutter	21 April 2013
87	9	"Ciężka ręka prawa (The heavy hand of the law)"	Wojciech Adamczyk	Robert Brutter	28 April 2013
88	10	"Koniec świata w Wilkowyjach (The end of the world in Wilkowyje)"	Wojciech Adamczyk	Robert Brutter	5 May 2013
89	11	"Czas konspiry (The conspiracy time)"	Wojciech Adamczyk	Robert Brutter	12 May 2013
90	12	"Trudne powroty (Difficult returns)"	Wojciech Adamczyk	Robert Brutter	19 May 2013
91	13	"Droga przez stos (The way through the pile)"	Wojciech Adamczyk	Robert Brutter	26 May 2013

=== Season 8 (2014) ===
No. overall	No. in series	Title	Directed by	Written by	Original release date
92	1	"Radio Mamrot (Radio Mamrot)"	Wojciech Adamczyk	Robert Brutter	2 March 2014
93	2	"Wykapany ojciec (The resemblance to father)"	Wojciech Adamczyk	Robert Brutter	9 March 2014
94	3	"Wybacz mnie (Forgive me)"	Wojciech Adamczyk	Robert Brutter	16 March 2014
95	4	"Czysta karta (The blank card)"	Wojciech Adamczyk	Robert Brutter	23 March 2014
96	5	"Obywatelskie obowiązki (Civic duties)"	Wojciech Adamczyk	Robert Brutter	30 March 2014
97	6	"Nowatorska terapia (The innovative therapy)"	Wojciech Adamczyk	Robert Brutter	5 April 2014
98	7	"Zbrodnia to niesłychana, pani zabija pana (The crime is unheard of, a lady kills a gentleman)"	Wojciech Adamczyk	Robert Brutter	12 April 2014
99	8	"Los pogorzelca (The fate of the fire-injured man)"	Wojciech Adamczyk	Robert Brutter	19 April 2014
100	9	"W blasku fleszy (In the spotlight)"	Wojciech Adamczyk	Robert Brutter	26 April 2014
101	10	"Grecy i Bułgarzy (Greeks and Bulgarians)"	Wojciech Adamczyk	Robert Brutter	2 May 2014
102	11	"Jedźmy, nikt nie woła (Let's go, nobody calls)"	Wojciech Adamczyk	Robert Brutter	9 May 2014
103	12	"Nie rzucaj ziemi, skąd twój ród (Do not give up the land, where your family comes from)"	Wojciech Adamczyk	Robert Brutter	16 May 2014
104	13	"Wielkie otwarcie (The great opening)"	Wojciech Adamczyk	Robert Brutter	23 May 2014

=== Season 9 (2015) ===
No. overall	No. in series	Title	Directed by	Written by	Original release date
105	1	"Nowe wyzwania (New challenges)"	Wojciech Adamczyk	Robert Brutter	8 March 2015
106	2	"Bardzo krótkie kariery (Very short careers)"	Wojciech Adamczyk	Robert Brutter	15 March 2015
107	3	"W szponach zdrowia (In the clutches of health)"	Wojciech Adamczyk	Robert Brutter	22 March 2015
108	4	"Gambit geniusza (The genius gambit)"	Wojciech Adamczyk	Robert Brutter	29 March 2015
109	5	"Potęga mediów (The power of media)"	Wojciech Adamczyk	Robert Brutter	5 April 2015
110	6	"Boska cząstka (The God Particle)"	Wojciech Adamczyk	Robert Brutter	12 April 2015
111	7	"Istotny dysonans (The significant dissonance)"	Wojciech Adamczyk	Robert Brutter	19 April 2015
112	8	"Demony Kusego (Demons of Kusy)"	Wojciech Adamczyk	Robert Brutter	26 April 2015
113	9	"Konie trojańskie (Trojan horses)"	Wojciech Adamczyk	Robert Brutter	3 May 2015
114	10	"Zamrożony kapitał (The frozen capital)"	Wojciech Adamczyk	Robert Brutter	10 May 2015
115	11	"Brzytwa dla tonącego (The razor for the drowning)"	Wojciech Adamczyk	Robert Brutter	24 May 2015
116	12	"Grzechy miłości (The sins of love)"	Wojciech Adamczyk	Robert Brutter	31 May 2015
117	13	"Złoty róg (The golden horn)"	Wojciech Adamczyk	Robert Brutter	7 June 2015

=== Season 10 (2016) ===
No. overall	No. in series	Title	Directed by	Written by	Original release date
118	1	"Kto tu rządzi (Who's the boss)"	Wojciech Adamczyk	Robert Brutter	4 September 2016
119	2	"Partyzancka dola (The partisan fate)"	Wojciech Adamczyk	Robert Brutter	11 September 2016
120	3	"Próba ognia (The fire test)"	Wojciech Adamczyk	Robert Brutter	18 September 2016
121	4	"Geny nie kłamią (Genes don't lie)"	Wojciech Adamczyk	Robert Brutter	25 September 2016
122	5	"Wszystko jest teatrem (Everything is a theater)"	Wojciech Adamczyk	Robert Brutter	2 October 2016
123	6	"Depresja Biskupa (Bishop's depression)"	Wojciech Adamczyk	Robert Brutter	9 October 2016
124	7	"Wet za wet (Tit for tat)"	Wojciech Adamczyk	Robert Brutter	16 October 2016
125	8	"Polityczny zombie (The political zombie)"	Wojciech Adamczyk	Robert Brutter	23 October 2016
126	9	"Edukacyjne dylematy (Educational dilemmas)"	Wojciech Adamczyk	Robert Brutter	30 October 2016
127	10	"Dominator (Dominator)"	Wojciech Adamczyk	Robert Brutter	6 November 2016
128	11	"Klauzula sumienia (The conscience clause)"	Wojciech Adamczyk	Robert Brutter	13 November 2016
129	12	"Ochotnicza straż kobiet (Volunteer women's guard)"	Wojciech Adamczyk	Robert Brutter	20 November 2016
130	13	"Cuda, cuda ogłaszają (They are announcing miracles, miracles)"	Wojciech Adamczyk	Robert Brutter	27 November 2016

=== Season 11 (2026/27) Revenge of witches ===
Season 11 will have 6 episodes. Episodes are going to be aired since December 2026.

== Viewing figures ==
Episode	1st season	2nd season	3rd season	4th season	5th season	6th season	7th season	8th season	9th season	10th season
1	4 396 564	6 993 951	7 411 177	8 731 526	8 505 195	7 296 506	6 289 835	6 383 012	6 861 726	4 871 510
2	4 308 423	7 003 036	7 168 720	8 781 551	7 812 933	6 871 595	6 463 328	6 445 700	7 000 249	4 774 436
3	4 674 041	6 896 669	6 373 730	8 532 874	7 201 978	6 554 510	6 129 170	6 078 428	6 688 884	5 107 647
4	4 917 123	6 594 469	6 989 417	8 856 741	7 448 975	6 649 278	6 070 625	6 415 648	5 765 600	5 026 592
5	4 930 817	6 806 420	6 858 379	8 135 420	7 039 028	6 526 647	5 467 634	6 227 364	4 916 711	5 199 098
6	4 416 068	6 220 465	6 943 357	8 104 889	6 858 208	5 973 975	6 373 755	6 305 006	6 215 655	5 180 200
7	4 314 409	6 691 196	7 014 966	7 697 001	5 750 352	6 138 934	6 863 240	6 513 615	6 473 427	5 244 073
8	4 245 310	5 957 569	6 730 041	8 528 782	6 100 137	6 622 856	6 394 566	5 767 091	6 196 250	5 315 237
9	4 832 273	6 919 954	7 187 346	8 104 969	6 254 249	5 385 754	6 607 831	6 376 867	6 099 286	5 560 644
10	4 459 323	6 825 023	6 622 214	7 765 372	6 645 897	6 461 324	6 256 213	5 975 399	5 544 175	
11	5 017 929	7 735 820	6 990 594	7 993 829	5 452 660	5 941 067	6 805 863	6 290 889	4 951 297	
12	5 218 512	7 102 324	6 494 720	7 585 219	6 184 945	5 156 260	6 145 820	6 189 613	5 628 265	
13	7 397 082	4 758 730	6 891 813	8 872 069	5 538 714	5 363 702	6 406 260	5 014 206	5 620 303	
Average viewing	4 101 154	6 857 229	6 898 190	8 283 864	6 676 405	6 226 339	6 328 780	6 152 526	5 997 064	

== Fun facts ==
- In 2013-2019 was produced Estonian television series Naabriplika (lit. "The girl from neighbourhood"), which was an adaptation of The Ranch. Naabriplika has 11 seasons and 131 episodes, and originally aired in Kanal 2.
