= Sokule, Radzyń County =

Sokule
- Village
- Location within Poland
- Coordinates: 51°56′N 22°35′E
- Country: Poland
- Voivodeship: Lublin
- County: Radzyń
- Gmina: Kąkolewnica Wschodnia

Sokule [sɔˈkulɛ] is a village in the administrative district of Gmina Kąkolewnica Wschodnia, within Radzyń County, Lublin Voivodeship, in eastern Poland.
