= John Porter (musician, born 1950) =

Welsh musician (born 1950)

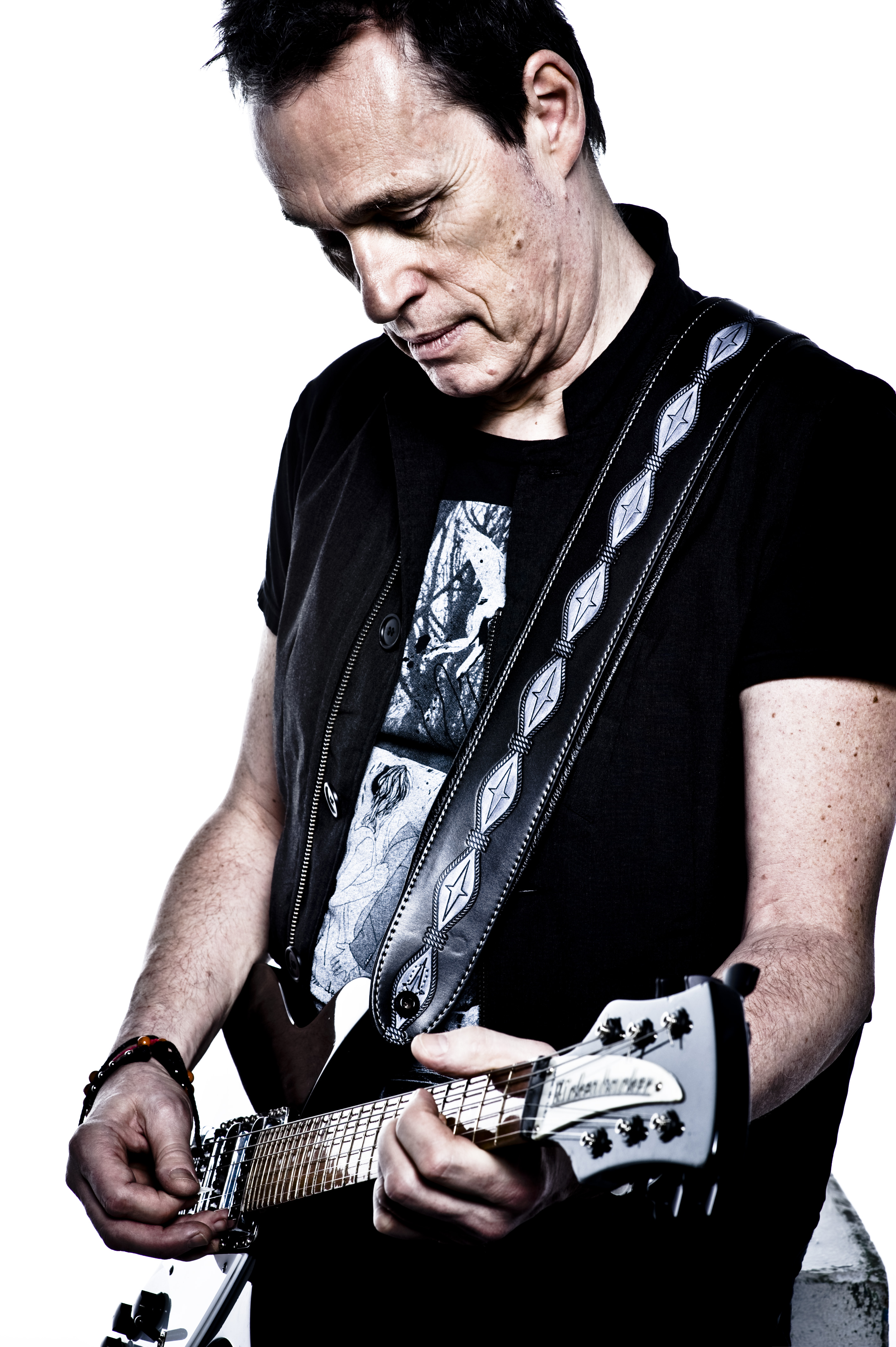
- Porter in 2011

Background information
- Born: 15 August 1950 (age 75); Lichfield
- Genres: Pop, indie pop, pop rock, rock, indie rock
- Occupations: Musician, songwriter, producer
- Instruments: Guitar, vocals
- Labels: Pomaton EMI, Agora SA, EMI Music Poland, Metal Mind Productions, Mystic Production
- Website: www.johnporter.com.pl

John Porter (born 15 August 1950) is a Welsh-born musician, composer and songwriter, living in Poland since 1976.

Originally from Lichfield, after studying political science in Sussex and spending time in Berlin, Porter moved to Poland in the mid-1970s.

He used to perform with his ex-life partner Anita Lipnicka. Their relationship lasted 2003–2015. In 2006, their daughter Pola was born.

== Discography ==
=== Albums ===
Title	Album details	Peak chart positions
Title	Album details	POL
Helicopters (Porter Band)	Released: 1979; Label: Pronit, Metal Mind; Formats: LP, CD	—
China Disco (Porter)	Released: 1982; Label: Pronit, Metal Mind; Formats: LP, CD	—
Wings Inside (Porter)	Released: 1989; Label: Polskie Nagrania Muza, Metal Mind; Formats: LP, CD	—
Life After Sex	Released: 1989; Label: unknown; Formats: CS	—
It's a Kid's Life (John Porter)	Released: 1990; Label: Pronit; Formats: LP	—
Incarnation (John Porter)	Released: 1991; Label: Yumi Records, Metal Mind; Formats: CD	—
Right Time (Mirror)	Released: 1991; Label: Reynoll Music, Metal Mind; Formats: CD	—
Alexandria (John Porter Band)	Released: 1993; Label: Schubert Music, Metal Mind; Formats: CD	—
Porter Band '99 (Porter Band)	Released: 1999; Label: Pomaton EMI, Metal Mind; Formats: CD	—
Psychodelikatesy (John Porter Band)	Released: 3 November 2008; Label: Metal Mind; Formats: CD	—
Back in Town (John Porter)	Released: 21 March 2011; Label: Agora; Formats: CD	—
Honey Trap (John Porter)	Released: 8 October 2014; Label: Mystic Production; Formats: CD, digital download	40
"—" denotes a recording that did not chart or was not released in that territory.

=== Live albums ===
Title	Album details
Mobilization (Porter Band)	Released: 1982; Label: Wifon, Metal Mind; Formats: LP, CD
Magic Moments (John Porter)	Released: 1983; Label: Pronit, Metal Mind; Formats: LP, CD
One Love (John Porter)	Released: 1987; Label: PolJazz, Metal Mind; Formats: LP, CD
Electric (Porter Band)	Released: 2000; Label: Universal Music, Metal Mind; Formats: CD

=== Compilation albums ===
Title	Album details
Złota kolekcja – Electric Years (John Porter)	Released: 3 October 2005; Label: EMI Music Poland; Formats: CD
Złota kolekcja vol.2 – Acoustic Years (John Porter)	Released: 27 February 2006; Label: EMI Music Poland; Formats: CD
Why? (John Porter)	Released: 18 June 2007; Label: Metal Mind Productions; Formats: CD (BOX)
Gwiazdy polskiej muzyki lat 80. (John Porter/Porter Band)	Released: 11 December 2007; Label: TMM Polska; Formats: CD

=== Collaborative albums ===
Title	Album details	Peak chart positions	Sales	Certifications
Title	Album details	POL	Sales	Certifications
Nieprzyzwoite piosenki (with Anita Lipnicka)	Released: 24 November 2003; Label: Pomaton EMI; Formats: CD, digital download	1	POL: 70,000+	POL: Platinum
Inside Story (with Anita Lipnicka)	Released: 19 September 2005; Label: Pomaton EMI; Formats: CD, digital download	2	POL: 15,000+	POL: Gold
Other Stories (with Anita Lipnicka)	Released: 2 October 2006; Label: Pomaton EMI; Formats: CD, digital download	39		
All the Stories (with Anita Lipnicka)	Released: 17 November 2006; Label: Pomaton EMI; Formats: CD+DVD, digital download	–		
Goodbye (with Anita Lipnicka)	Released: 25 February 2008; Label: Pomaton EMI; Formats: CD, digital download	2	POL: 15,000+	POL: Gold
Songs of Love and Death (Me and That Man)	Released: 24 March 2017; Label: Cooking Vinyl, Wydawnictwo Agora; Formats: LP, CD, digital download	3		
"—" denotes a recording that did not chart or was not released in that territory.
