= Piotr Pręgowski =

Polish actor

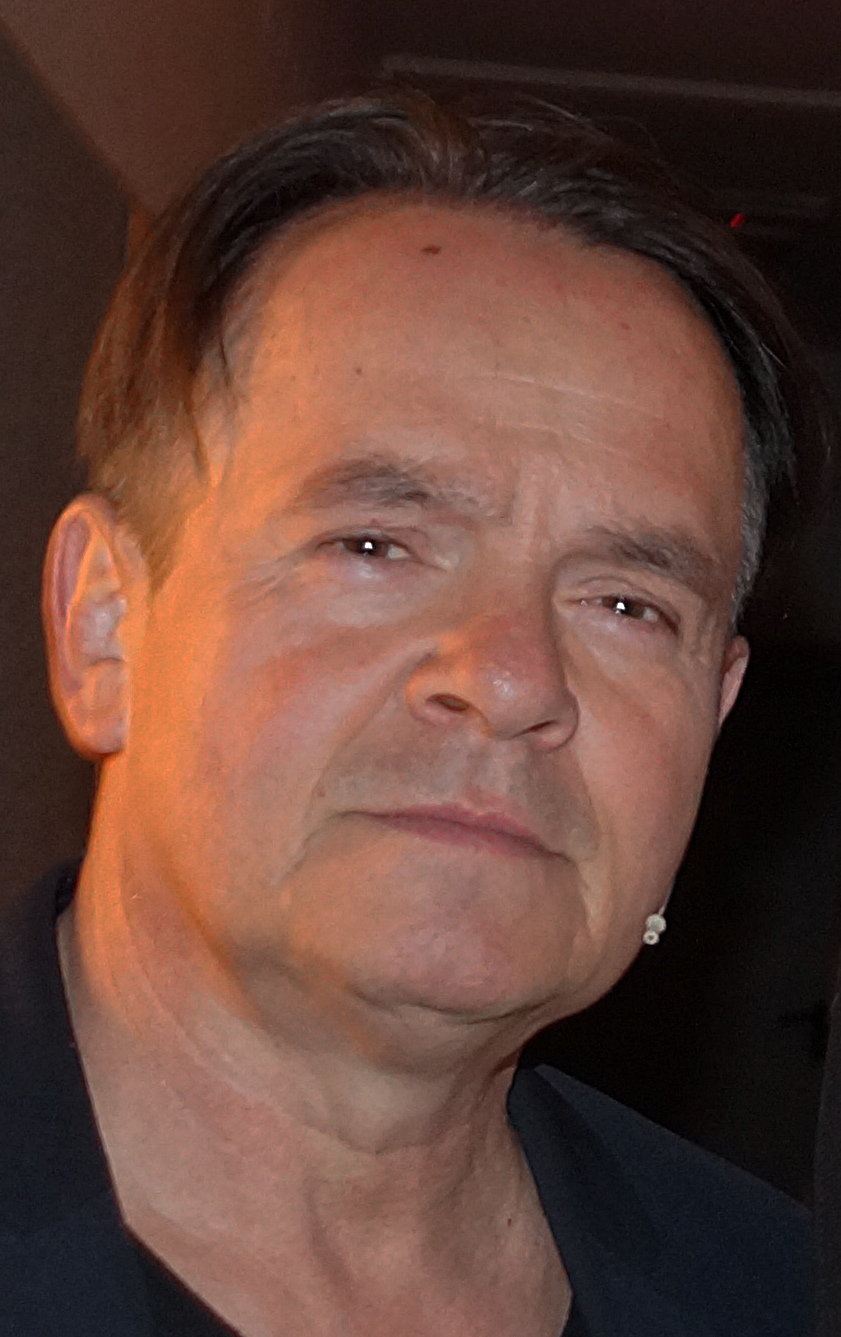
- Pręgowski in 2017
- Born: 15 February 1954 (age 72); Warsaw, Poland
- Years active: 1977–present

Piotr Edward Pręgowski (born 15 February 1954), is a Polish actor best known for playing the role of singer Patryk Pietrek in The Ranch. He has made over 20 appearances in film and television. He also starred in the 1986–1987 television series Zmiennicy and dubbed the Boo-Boo Bear in multiple Yogi Bear shows and movies.

In March 2026, he placed fourth in Finał krajowych kwalifikacji, the Polish national final for the Eurovision Song Contest 2026, with the song "Parawany tango".
