= Sylwester Maciejewski =

Polish actor

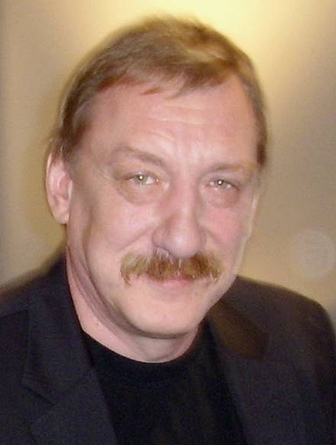
- Maciejewski in 2007
- Born: 10 June 1955 (age 70); Żyrardów, Poland
- Occupation: actor

Maciej Sylwester Maciejewski (born 10 July 1955 in Żyrardów, Poland) is a Polish actor, with roles in many films.

== Life ==
In 1978, Maciejewski graduated from Akademia Teatralna im. Aleksandra Zelwerowicza in Warsaw. His wife, Barbara, was involved in the Teatr Wielki in Warsaw.

== Filmography ==
- Sprawiedliwi .... Piatek (TV, 2 episodes, 2010)
- Ranczo .... Solejuk (TV, 41 episodes, 2006–2009, 2011–2016)
- Ranczo Wilkowyje (2007) .... Solejuk
- Twarzą w twarz .... Prison Doctor (TV, 1 episode, 2007)
- Rys (2007) .... Kutyna
- Plebania .... Stefan Martyniuk (TV, 22 episodes, 2003–2006)
- Boża podszewka. Część druga (2005) (TV)
- Skazany na bluesa (2005) .... Sergeant
- Stranger (2004)
- Ławeczka (2004) .... Stefan, ship captain
- Stara baśn. Kiedy słońce było bogiem (2003) .... Bumir
- Na dobre i na zle .... Master (TV, 2 episodes, 2003)
- Superprodukcja (2003) .... Capt. Bergman
- Sfora (2002) (TV) .... Górko
- Wiedźmin (2002) (TV) .... Wójt
- Kariera Nikosia Dyzmy (2002) .... Director
- Money Is Not Everything (2001) .... Maślanka
- Wielkie rzeczy: Gra (2000) (TV)
- I'm Looking at You, Mary (2000) (TV)
- Miasteczko (2000) .... Antoni (TV, unknown episodes)
- Love Me and Do Whatever You Want (1998) .... Jordan
- 13 posterunek .... Urban Guardian (TV, 1 episode, 1998)
- Pestka (1995) .... Sanctuary Train Conductor
- Calls Controlled (1991) .... Worker
- Panny i wdowy (1991)
- Po upadku. Sceny z życia nomenklatury (1990) .... Uczestnik polowania
- Zmowa (1990) (TV) .... Bogusław Witkowski
- Zabić na koncu (1990)
- Dekalog (1 episode, 1990)
- Opowieść Harleya (1988)
- Weryfikacja (1987) .... Cardplayer
- Brawo mistrzu (1987) (TV)
- Alternatywy 4 .... Bridegroom (TV, 1 episode, 1986)
- Siekierezada (1986)
- Cuckoo in a Dark Forest (1986) .... Knopke, SS-man
- Dlużnicy śmierci (1986) .... Chlop
- Miłość z listy przebojów (1985)
- 07 zgloś się .... Militiaman (TV, 1 episode, 1984)
- Kasztelanka (1983) (TV) .... Pastuch Stasiek
- Konopielka (1982)
- Śpiewy po rosie (1982) .... Bronek
- Białe tango .... Edward Radziejewski (TV, 1 episode, 1981)
- Bez znieczulenia (1978) (as Maciej Maciejewski) .... Student

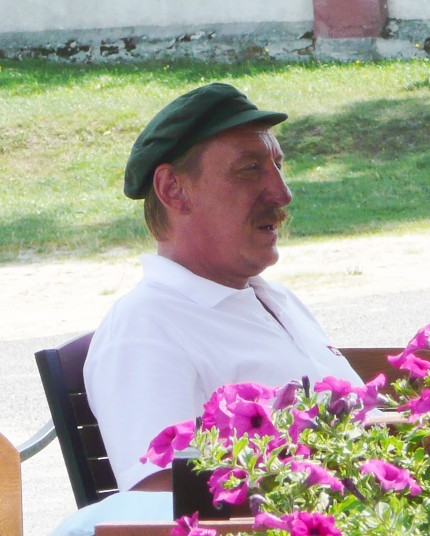
Maciejewski on the set of Ranczo Wilkowyje in 2007.

=== Polish dubbing ===
- 2009: The Courageous Heart of Irena Sendler .... Peter
- 2008: Speed Racer
- 2007: TMNT
- 2007: Ratatouille .... Larousse
- 2006: Cars .... Mack
- 2005: Herbie: Fully Loaded .... Driver
- 2005: Inspector Gadget
- 2003: Finding Nemo
- 2002: Camelot .... King Arthur
- 2000: Help! I'm a Fish .... Shark
- 2000: Planescape: Torment
- 1999: Król sokołów
- 1997: Pokémon
- 1987–1990: DuckTales
- 1985: The 13 Ghosts of Scooby-Doo
- 1983: Looney Tunes .... Foghorn Leghorn
- 1973: The Mad Adventures of Rabbi Jacob
- 1972–1973: The New Scooby-Doo Movies
