= Anita Lipnicka =

Polish singer and songwriter (born 1975)

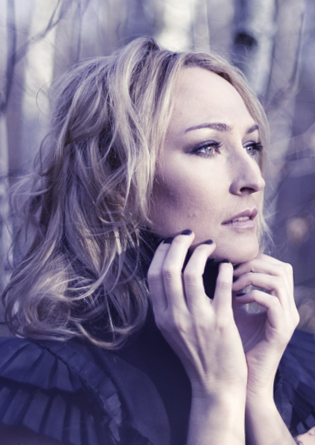
- Anita Lipnicka (2011)
- Born: 13 June 1975 (age 51); Piotrków Trybunalski, Poland
- Occupations: Musician, singer, songwriter, record producer
- Musical career
- Genres: Pop, indie pop, pop rock
- Instruments: Guitar, vocals
- Labels: Pomaton EMI, EMI Music Poland, Mystic Production
- Website: www.anitalipnicka.com

Anita Lipnicka (born 13 June 1975) is a Polish singer and songwriter.

== Biography ==
Anita Lipnicka was born in Piotrków Trybunalski. Her career as a singer started in Varius Manx, a band with which she achieved success. In 1996, she decided to pursue a solo career, left the band, and moved to London, where she recorded her first solo album. The album, titled Wszystko się może zdarzyć (Everything Can Happen) became a success. In 1998, Lipnicka released her second solo album, To, co naprawdę (What Is Real). In 2000, her third solo album Moje oczy sa zielone (My eyes are green, was released.

In 2001, Lipnicka started to work with John Porter. Together they recorded two albums, Nieprzyzwoite piosenki (Indecent Songs) in 2003 and Inside Story in 2005. Both albums were all in English. The album Indecent Songs won The Fryderyk award for The Pop Album of the Year. In 2006 they released a mini-disc called "Other Stories" and a collection of all their records plus a DVD with their videos called "All The Stories".

In February 2008, the duet released their third studio album "Goodbye" which is said to be their last album recorded together. They decided to focus on their solo careers, but they remained a couple in their private life until 2015. In 2008, the American singer and songwriter Chris Eckman released his CD "The Last Side of the Mountain", duetting with Anita Lipnicka on the number "Who Will Light Your Path". As all other songs on the CD it is an adaptation of a poem by the Slovenian poet Dane Zajc.

Lipnicka and Porter have one daughter, Pola (born 24 February 2006). Anita Lipnicka is a sister of Arkadiusz Lipnicki, a member of Polish theater team 'Rafał Kmita Group'.

On 13 November 2009 Lipnicka released her solo album "Hard Land of Wonder". The first single from the album was "Car Door". The album became Gold.

== Discography ==
=== Solo albums ===
Title	Album details	Peak chart positions	Sales	Certifications
Title	Album details	POL	Sales	Certifications
Wszystko się może zdarzyć	Released: 28 October 1996; Label: Pomaton EMI; Formats: CD, digital download	—	POL: 600,000+	POL: 3× Platinum
To co naprawdę	Released: 9 June 1998; Label: Pomaton EMI; Formats: CD, digital download	—	POL: 50,000+	POL: Gold
Moje oczy są zielone	Released: 30 October 2000; Label: Pomaton EMI; Formats: CD, digital download	28		
Hard Land of Wonder	Released: 16 November 2009; Label: EMI Music Poland; Formats: CD, digital download	6	POL: 15,000+	POL: Gold
Vena Amoris	Released: 4 October 2013; Label: Mystic Production; Formats: CD, digital download	12		
"—" denotes a recording that did not chart or was not released in that territory.

=== Collaborative albums ===
Title	Album details	Peak chart positions	Sales	Certifications
Title	Album details	POL	Sales	Certifications
Nieprzyzwoite piosenki (with John Porter)	Released: 24 November 2003; Label: Pomaton EMI; Formats: CD, digital download	1	POL: 70,000+	POL: Platinum
Inside Story (with John Porter)	Released: 19 September 2005; Label: Pomaton EMI; Formats: CD, digital download	2	POL: 15,000+	POL: Gold
Other Stories (with John Porter)	Released: 2 October 2006; Label: Pomaton EMI; Formats: CD, digital download	39		
All the Stories (with John Porter)	Released: 17 November 2006; Label: Pomaton EMI; Formats: CD+DVD, digital download	—		
Goodbye (with John Porter)	Released: 25 February 2008; Label: Pomaton EMI; Formats: CD, digital download	2	POL: 15,000+	POL: Gold
W siódmym niebie (with Voice Band)	Released: 4 April 2012; Label: Warner Music Poland; Formats: CD, digital download	13		
"—" denotes a recording that did not chart or was not released in that territory.
