= Tomasz Drabek =

Polish actor (born 1973)

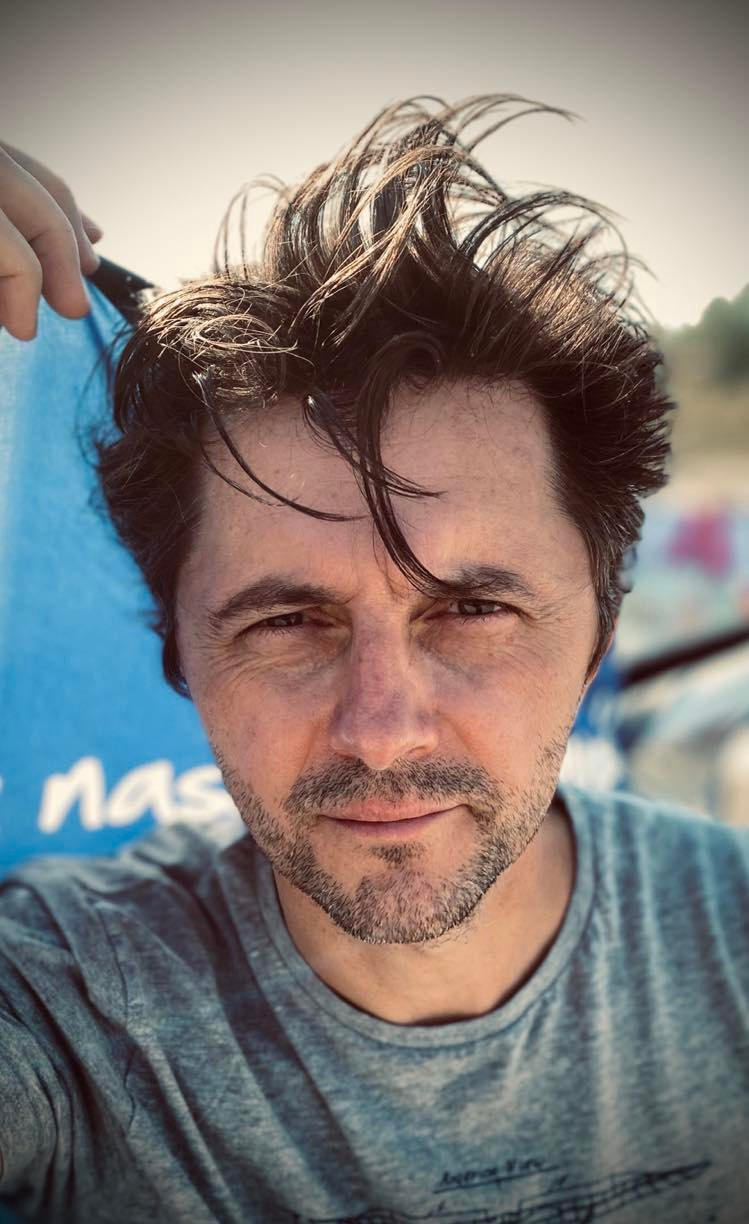
- Drabek in 2022.
- Born: 19 July 1973 (age 53); Bielsko-Biała, Poland
- Education: Jagellonian University
- Occupation: Actor
- Years active: 1997–present
- Spouse: Anna Iberszer
- Children: 1

Tomasz Drabek (Polish: [ˈtɔ.maʂ ˈdra.bɛk]; born 19 July 1973) is a Polish stage, film, and television actor.

== Biography ==
Tomasz Drabek was born on 19 July 1973 in Bielsko-Biała, Poland. From 1997 to 2013, he performed in over 40 plays in the Polish Theatre in Bielsko-Biała. In 1999, he has graduated from the Faculty of Polish Studies of the Jagellonian University in Kraków, and in 2001 he received an acting arts degree from the Union of Polish Stage Artists. In 2012, he moved to Warsaw, where he joined the comedy group Fire in a Brothel. Since 2018, he is a member of the Warsaw Polish Theatre, and he also occasionally performed in Och-Teatr and WarSawa Theatre.

== Private life ==
He is married to actress Anna Iberszer, with whom he has a son, Karol. He is thebrother of politician Przemysław Drabek, who, since 2019, has been a member of the Sejm of Poland.

== Filmography ==
=== Films ===
| Year | Title | Role | Notes |
|---|---|---|---|
| 1999 | Anhell | | Television play |
| 2006 | Bez Iluzji | | Short film |
| 2006 | The Devil from Seventh Grade | Professor Dobrowolski | Feature film |
| 2007 | Ryś | VIP | Feature film |
| 2008 | Ściana śmierci | | Documentary film |
| 2009 | Tak nam się usiadło | —N/a | Short film; director and screenwriter |
| 2011 | Battle of Warsaw 1920 | Commander in Ossów | Feature film |
| 2014 | The Last Waltz | Soldier | Short film |
| 2015 | Wkręceni 2 | Wardrobe stylist | Feature film |
| 2015 | Zakład Doświadczalny Solidarność | Mr. Mirek | Television play |
| 2021 | Lewiatan | Anthony F. Sweetchild | Television play |
| 2022 | 8 Things You Don't Know About Men | Junior aspirant | Feature film |
| 2022 | Backwards | Czesław Sobczak | Feature film |
| 2023 | Feast of Fire | Physician | Feature film |
| 2025 | Allegroverse 25: Legenda Allegrowicza | Boruta | Interactive film |
| 2025 | LARP: Love, Trolls and Other Quests | Fabian Ausztol | Feature film |

=== Television series ===
| Year | Title | Role | Notes |
|---|---|---|---|
| 2006 | The Devil from Seventh Grade | Professor Dobrowolski | Miniseries; 2 episodes |
| 2007 | Święta wojna | Marcin | Episode "Krawciorz przodowy" (no. 261) |
| 2008 | Giraffe and Rhino Hotel | Commercial director | Episode: "Perła" (no. 11) |
| 2008 | Żołnierze wyklęci | Hieronim Dekutowski | 3 episodes |
| 2009 | Niania | Security guard | Episode: "Na obczyźnie" (no. 126) |
| 2010 | Chichot losu | Messenger | Episode: "Niemożliwe" (no. 3) |
| 2010 | Majka | Dr. Terlecki | |
| 2010 | Mountain Rescue Team | Petrol station employee | Episode no. 7 |
| 2011 | Prosto w serce | Receptionist | Episode no. 138 |
| 2013 | Boscy w sieci | Play attendant | Episode no. 2 |
| 2013 | Family.pl | Jerzy Dziębałło | Episode: "Wiecznie młodzi" (no. 89) |
| 2013 | The Ranch | Gabrielski | 2 episodes |
| 2014 | Baron24 | Opałko | Episode: "Protest" (no. 5) |
| 2014 | Days of Honor | Szóstak | Episode: "Szyfr 'inżyniera'" (no. 10) |
| 2014 | Friends | Anna's lawyer | 3 episodes |
| 2014 | I'll Be Fine | Man on a date | Episode no. 7 |
| 2014 | Piąty Stadion | Football team chairperson | Episode: "Targowisko" (no. 136) |
| 2015 | Aż po sufit! | Leszek | 6 episodes |
| 2015 | Nie rób scen | Roman Żyłka | Episode: "Pogrzebana randka" (no. 10) |
| 2015 | True Law | Lay judge | Episode no. 83 |
| 2015 | Zziajani | Security guard | Episode no. 2 |
| 2016 | Polish Legends | Boruta | 2 episodes |
| 2017 | The Chairman's Ear | Manfred | Episode: "When Against Your Doors They Thud" (no. 8) |
| 2017 | The Chairman's Ear | Goebbels | Episode: "The Whole Nation Rejoices" |
| 2017–2019 | Diagnosis | Tomasz Wolsk | 29 episodes |
| 2018 | W rytmie serca | Paweł | Episode: "Więzy krwi" (no. 22) |
| 2020 | Komisarz Alex | Tobiasz Lieberman | Episode: "Randka z milionerem" (no. 173) |
| 2021 | Father Matthew | Janusz Lipka | Episode: "Zmyłka" (no. 336) |
| 2021 | The Office PL | Management member | Episode: "Prezentacja" (no. 12) |
| 2022 | Heart Parade | Roguz | |
| 2022 | Hold Tight | Janusz Nowak | 6 episodes |
| 2022 | A Minute of Silence | Ireneusz Sawicki | 3 episodes |
| 2023 | Pati | Marek Rulewski | 4 episodes |
| 2023 | Sexify | Talk show host | Episode no. 9 |
| 2024 | Shadow Play | Captain Skowronek | 7 episodes |
| Unknown | Na Wspólnej | Dr. Terlecki | |

=== Polish-language dubbing ===
| Year | Title | Role | Notes |
|---|---|---|---|
| 1998 | Jack Orlando | Additional voices | Video game |
| 1999 | Shogo: Mobile Armor Division | Additional voices | Video game; original released in 1998 |
| 2003 | Runaway: A Road Adventure | Additional voices | Video game; original released in 2001 |
| 2004 | Kiddo: The Super-Truck | Additional voices | Feature film |
| 2005 | Earth 2160 | Additional voices | Video game |
| 2006 | Neuro Hunter | Additional voices | Video game; original released in 2005 |
| 2012 | The Avengers | Additional voices | Feature film |
| 2012 | Austin & Ally | Clavis | Television series; episode: "Albums & Auditions" (no. 19) |
| 2012 | Summer Days | Micha | Television series |
| 2013 | Jack the Giant Slayer | Additional voices | Feature film |
| 2014 | Clarence | Nathan | Television series; 6 episodes |
| 2014 | Clarence | Mel | Television series; episode: "Dollar Hunt" (no. 10) |
| 2014 | Clarence | Police officer | Television series; episode: "Pilot Expansion" (no. 24) |
| 2014 | Over the Garden Wall | Background voices | Television series; episode: "Songs of the Dark Lantern" (no. 4) |
| 2014 | Over the Garden Wall | Fred | Television series; 2 episodes |
| 2014 | Over the Garden Wall | Intern | Television series; episode: "Songs of the Dark Lantern" (no. 4) |
| 2014 | Over the Garden Wall | Jason Funderburker | Television series; 2 episodes |
| 2014 | Over the Garden Wall | Master | Television series; episode: "Songs of the Dark Lantern" (no. 4) |
| 2014 | Over the Garden Wall | Pottsfield resident | Television series; episode: "Hard Times at the Huskin' Bee" (no. 2) |
| 2015 | The New Adventures of Aladdin | Additional voices | Feature film |
| 2018 | Ralph Breaks the Internet | Maybe | Feature film |
| 2019 | Kim Possible | Dr. Glopman | Feature film |
| 2021 | Loki | Martin | Television series; episode: "Glorious Purpose" (no. 1) |
