= List of Clarence episodes =

Clarence is an American animated television series created by Skyler Page for Cartoon Network. Page, a former Cartoon Network storyboard artist for the series Adventure Time and storyboard revisionist for Secret Mountain Fort Awesome, developed the series at Cartoon Network Studios in 2012 as part of their animated short development initiative. The series revolves around a young boy named Clarence, who is optimistic about everything. The network initially commissioned twelve 15-minute episodes, and aired the pilot following the 2014 Hall of Game Awards show on February 17, 2014.

On July 25, 2014, Cartoon Network announced they had ordered 26 more episodes of Clarence, bringing the first season to a total of 51 episodes.

In July 2015, the series was picked up for a second season by Cartoon Network which premiered on January 18, 2016 and ended on February 3, 2017.

The third and final season premiered on February 10, 2017 and ended on June 24, 2018.

During the course of the series, 130 episodes of Clarence aired over three seasons.

== Series overview ==
Season	Episodes	Originally released	
Season	Episodes	First released	Last released
Pilot		May 21, 2013 (online); February 17, 2014 (TV)	
1	51	April 14, 2014	October 27, 2015
2	39	January 18, 2016	February 3, 2017
3	40	February 10, 2017	June 24, 2018
Shorts	14	July 6, 2015	June 24, 2018

== Episodes ==
=== Pilot (2013) ===
Title	Directed by	Written and Storyboarded by	Original release date	Original release date	Airdate in Australia	US viewers (millions)
"Clarence"	Phil Rynda (creative), Sue Mondt (art), and Robert Alvarez (timing)	Skyler Page	May 21, 2013 (Online)	February 17, 2014	September 20, 2014	1.06
Clarence is the "new kid" in Aberdale, so he throws a party, but only Sumo and Jeff show up. Things turn crazy when Clarence and Sumo attempt to show Jeff a good time. Note: The pilot was originally released on iTunes and Cartoon Network's website.

=== Season 1 (2014–15) ===
No. overall	No. in season	Title	Written by	Storyboarded by	Original release date	Prod. code	US viewers (millions)
1	1	"Fun Dungeon Face Off"	Skyler Page and Patrick Harpin	Nelson Boles and Skyler Page	April 14, 2014	1018-003	2.26
At the Rough Riders Chicken restaurant, Clarence attempts to help Jeff overcome his germ phobia by stealing his french fries and going into the Fun Dungeon, however, Clarence's attempts make Jeff go crazy.
2	2	"Pretty Great Day with a Girl"	Skyler Page and Patrick Harpin	Nelson Boles and Skyler Page	April 14, 2014	1018-001	2.26
Clarence and his friend Amy (voiced by Ava Acres) from down the block get caught up in a "pinecone war" with Belson, Nathan, Dustin and Percy while on a hunt for an erratic.
3	3	"Money Broom Wizard"	Skyler Page and Patrick Harpin	Skyler Page	April 21, 2014	1018-002	2.37
Clarence, Jeff and Sumo try to enjoy the local arcade Pizza Swamp with only $1.00 to spend. Clarence tries his best having fun without a game to play, Jeff tires to win in a "Money Broom" game, and Sumo gets addicted in a simulator game with a giant screen.
4	4	"Lost in the Supermarket"	Skyler Page and Patrick Harpin	Derek Evanick and Diana Lafyatis	April 21, 2014	1018-008	2.37
Clarence finds adventure, trouble and unlocks secrets at the local supermarket when he gets lost.
5	5	"Clarence's Millions"	Skyler Page and Patrick Harpin	Derek Evanick and Diana Lafyatis	April 28, 2014	1018-010	2.10
When Clarence grows tired of "buddy stars", Ms. Baker's way of giving her students points for behaving, he creates his own currency, Clarence Dollars, as an alternative reward system. But it gets pretty out of hand.
6	6	"Clarence Gets a Girlfriend"	Skyler Page and Patrick Harpin	Erica Jones and Katie Mitroff	May 5, 2014	1018-005	1.92
Clarence, with Sumo's help, turns himself into a gentleman before his "date" with a girl in his art class, Ashley, much to Jeff's jealousy.
7	7	"Jeff's New Toy"	Spencer Rothbell; Skyler Page, Mark Banker, and Spencer Rothbell (story)	Derek Evanick and Diana Lafyatis	May 12, 2014	1018-013	N/A
At Jeff's house, Clarence and Sumo clash over keeping Jeff's new toy in its box.
8	8	"Dinner Party"	Skyler Page and Patrick Harpin; Skyler Page, Patrick Harpin, and Yvette Kaplan (story)	Derek Evanick and Diana Lafyatis	June 12, 2014	1018-004	N/A
When Clarence attends a dinner party at Breehn's house with Mary and Chad, he tries to have fun wherever he can.
9	9	"Honk"	Mark Banker; Skyler Page, Mark Banker, and Spencer Rothbell (story)	Niki Yang and Stephen P. Neary	June 19, 2014	1018-014	N/A
Clarence plays with a horn at school and everyone loves it, but it soon gets annoying.
10	10	"Dollar Hunt"	Mark Banker; Skyler Page, Mark Banker, and Spencer Rothbell (story)	Brett Varon and Charlie Gavin	June 26, 2014	1018-012	N/A
Clarence tries to make new friends through his "dollar hunt" game, but in the process, unwittingly buries the 20 dollars his mother gave him for groceries.
11	11	"Zoo"	Spencer Rothbell; Skyler Page, Mark Banker, and Spencer Rothbell (story)	Derek Evanick and Diana Lafyatis	July 3, 2014	1018-016	1.84
When Clarence and Belson are paired up during a field trip to the zoo, they have an adventure while they look for the dolphins.
12	12	"Rise 'n' Shine"	Mark Banker; Skyler Page, Mark Banker, and Spencer Rothbell (story)	Niki Yang and Stephen P. Neary	July 10, 2014	1018-017	N/A
Clarence experiences the early morning with all sorts of activities and encounters a mountain lion in the backyard.
13	13	"Man of the House"	Mark Banker; Skyler Page, Mark Banker, and Spencer Rothbell (story)	Brett Varon and Charlie Gavin	July 17, 2014	1018-015	N/A
Clarence and his friends spend the night alone for the first time after Mary and Chad go out, but their fun quickly spirals out of control.
14	14	"Puddle Eyes"	Spencer Rothbell; Skyler Page, Mark Banker, and Spencer Rothbell (story)	Derek Evanick and Diana Lafyatis	July 24, 2014	1018-018	1.95
Clarence believes he's gone blind when gets mud in his eyes, right before the school's "20/20 Vision Bee", but not if Jeff can save the day.
15	15	"Dream Boat"	Mark Banker; Skyler Page, Mark Banker, and Spencer Rothbell (story)	Stephen P. Neary and Tyler Chen	July 31, 2014	1018-020	N/A
Inspired by Mr. Reese, Sumo devotes himself to building a boat.
16	16	"Slumber Party"	Spencer Rothbell; Skyler Page, Spencer Rothbell, and Patrick Harpin (story)	Niki Yang and Stephen P. Neary	August 7, 2014	1018-011	1.65
Clarence is accidentally invited to Kimby's slumber party, while Jeff and Sumo engage in a prank war with each other.
17	17	"Nature Clarence"	Spencer Rothbell; Skyler Page, Mark Banker, and Spencer Rothbell (story)	Brett Varon and Charlie Gavin	August 14, 2014	1018-019	1.75
Clarence, Jeff, Sumo and Percy go hiking in search of a legendary hot spring with Josh, but it veers off course, prompting Clarence to take the lead.
18	18	"Average Jeff"	Spencer Rothbell; Skyler Page, Mark Banker, and Spencer Rothbell (story)	Diana Lafyatis and Derek Evanick	October 2, 2014	1018-022	1.82
Jeff is shocked to find that he is placed in a class with below-average students after taking an IQ test, causing him to suffer an identity crisis.
19	19	"Lizard Day Afternoon"	Mark Banker; Skyler Page, Mark Banker, and Spencer Rothbell (story)	Brett Varon and Kyler Spears	October 9, 2014	1018-021	1.80
Clarence and Sumo chase a lizard and get unexpected rewards while Jeff tries to get a turn playing with Belson's new game system, the "Cerebus Breach".
20	20	"The Forgotten"	Mark Banker; Skyler Page, Mark Banker, and Spencer Rothbell (story)	Stephen P. Neary and Niki Yang	October 16, 2014	1018-009	2.29
Clarence and his fellow classmate Brady are the only kids who did not get a ride from school, so they have to find their own way home.
21	21	"Neighborhood Grill"	Spencer Rothbell; Skyler Page, Mark Banker, and Spencer Rothbell (story)	Derek Evanick and Diana Lafyatis	October 23, 2014	1018-007	1.47
Clarence is shocked to see Ms. Baker at Chuckleton's, a local family restaurant, and he can't resist the urge to interrupt her on her date.
22	22	"Belson's Sleepover"	Patrick Harpin; Skyler Page and Patrick Harpin (story)	Derek Evanick, Charlie Gavin, Diana Lafyatis, and Ian Wasseluk	October 30, 2014	1018-006	1.56
Belson throws a sleepover and promises a rare video game system to the person who can make it all night without being pranked.
23	23	"Too Gross for Comfort"	Mark Banker; Skyler Page, Mark Banker, and Spencer Rothbell (story)	Stephen P. Neary and Tyler Chen	November 6, 2014	1018-023	1.63
When Clarence takes Chelsea to the boys' treehouse, they all (even Jeff) compete to see who can tell the grossest story to drive her away.
24	24	"Pilot Expansion"	Skyler Page and Mark Banker; Skyler Page, Mark Banker, and Spencer Rothbell (story)	Skyler Page, Raymie Muzquiz, Stephen P. Neary, and Niki Yang	November 13, 2014	1018-024	1.73
In the distant future, Clarence, Jeff and Sumo are old men trying to remember the day they first met. Note: This is the extended version of the show's pilot episode, which includes a new song, "Hit the Piñata".
25	25	"Patients"	Mark Banker; Skyler Page, Mark Banker, and Spencer Rothbell (story)	Stephen P. Neary and Niki Yang	November 20, 2014	1018-026	1.86
To combat the boredom of a doctor's office waiting room, Clarence invents a game where the prize is candy from the reception desk.
26	26	"Rough Riders Elementary"	Spencer Rothbell; Skyler Page, Mark Banker, and Spencer Rothbell (story)	Brett Varon and Zeus Cervas	November 20, 2014	1018-025	1.46
Clarence angrily stands up to Josh, the sponsor of Rough Riders Chicken, because it turns out the sponsorship is taking over the school.
27	27	"Nothing Ventured"	Mark Banker; Skyler Page, Mark Banker, and Spencer Rothbell (story)	Kurt Dumas and Antony Mazzotta	December 2, 2014	1018-028	1.40
Chad and Mr. Sumozski want to earn money, so Clarence and Sumo put grasshoppers into people's houses, believing that people will pay them to a pest extermination service, but realize they're cockroaches.
28	28	"Bedside Manners"	Mark Banker; Skyler Page, Mark Banker, and Spencer Rothbell (story)	Brett Varon and Kyler Spears	December 3, 2014	1018-027	1.41
Clarence tries to cheer up Belson at the hospital after an attempt to prank him goes wrong and he gets put into a body cast.
29	29	"Jeff Wins"	Spencer Rothbell; Skyler Page, Mark Banker, and Spencer Rothbell (story)	Brett Varon and Kyler Spears	December 4, 2014	1018-030	1.55
Clarence helps Jeff prepare for a cooking competition because, due to past failures, Jeff cannot keep his head.
30	30	"Suspended"	Spencer Rothbell; Skyler Page, Mark Banker, Spencer Rothbell, and Katie Crown (story)	Stephen P. Neary and Niki Yang	April 6, 2015	1018-031	1.49
After pulling a prank on Ms. Baker, Sumo and Clarence get suspended for a week and begin to exploit their newfound freedom.
31	31	"Turtle Hats"	Katie Crown; Spencer Rothbell and Katie Crown (story)	Brett Varon and Kyler Spears	April 7, 2015	1018-034	1.44
Ms. Baker accidentally assigns the class to do an assignment about "turtle hats", but everyone, even Clarence, Jeff and Sumo, have a hard time understanding the meaning of turtle hats.
32	32	"Goose Chase"	Katie Crown; Spencer Rothbell and Katie Crown (story)	Kurt Dumas and Antony Mazzotta	April 8, 2015	1018-035	1.53
At the park, Clarence imagines himself as the king of the birds, until a goose starts annoying him.
33	33	"Goldfish Follies"	Spencer Rothbell; Skyler Page and Mark Banker (story)	Stephen P. Neary and Niki Yang	April 9, 2015	1018-029	1.90
In an episode animated in the style of Fleischer Studios cartoons, Clarence struggles to get his new goldfish, Fishby, into water after he accidentally breaks the bag.
34	34	"Chimney"	Katie Crown; Spencer Rothbell and Katie Crown (story)	Brett Varon and Kyler Spears	April 10, 2015	1018-036	1.37
Clarence, Jeff and Sumo befriend a wild dog who they name Chimney, while playing in the woods, who later comes to their rescue when they get trapped in a well.
35	35	"Straight Illin"	Spencer Rothbell; Spencer Rothbell, Skyler Page, Mark Banker, and Katie Crown (story)	Niki Yang and Stephen P. Neary	April 16, 2015	1018-033	1.40
In an escalating series of dares, Belson dares Clarence to eat 500 deviled eggs, but gets sick in the process. When the other kids find out about this, they set out to save Clarence before he infects the entire city. Note: This episode was banned from later airings due to its disturbing plot and gross content.
36	36	"Dust Buddies"	Katie Crown; Skyler Page, Mark Banker, Spencer Rothbell, and Katie Crown (story)	Kurt Dumas and Antony Mazzotta	April 23, 2015	1018-032	1.43
As a punishment, Belson's mom makes Belson clean the house while their maid, Lupe (voiced by Maria Canals Barrera), goes to clean Clarence's house.
37	37	"Hurricane Dilliss"	Spencer Rothbell; Skyler Page, Spencer Rothbell, and Katie Crown (story)	Kurt Dumas and Antony Mazzotta	April 30, 2015	1018-037	1.10
Clarence's grandmother, Dilliss, drops by for a sudden visit and starts meddling in his family life.
38	38	"Hoofin' It"	Katie Crown; Skyler Page, Spencer Rothbell, and Katie Crown (story)	Kurt Dumas and Antony Mazzotta	May 7, 2015	1018-040	1.63
Clarence is not as excited for the annual Aberdale Greased Pig Chase as everyone else.
39	39	"Detention"	Tony Infante; Nelson Boles, Spencer Rothbell, and Tony Infante (story)	Niki Yang and Stephen P. Neary	May 14, 2015	1018-042	1.25
When detention starts becoming the place to be when Mr. Reese falls asleep if given a doughnut, Clarence turns it into a "too-cool-for-school" club.
40	40	"Hairence"	Spencer Rothbell; Skyler Page, Spencer Rothbell, and Charlie Gavin (story)	Kyler Spears and Brett Varon	May 21, 2015	1018-039	1.46
Clarence gets his first summer job: he gets to work at his mother's barber shop, but when a rude customer comes and starts bossing around the staff, Clarence gives her an unforgettable haircut.
41	41	"Li'l Buddy"	Spencer Rothbell; Skyler Page, Spencer Rothbell, and Katie Crown (story)	Niki Yang and Stephen P. Neary	July 20, 2015	1018-038	1.42
Clarence's social life spirals out of control when he gets in trouble for playing with his "Li'l Buddy" doll.
42	42	"Chalmers Santiago"	Spencer Rothbell; Nelson Boles, Spencer Rothbell, and Tony Infante (story)	Kyler Spears and Brett Varon	July 21, 2015	1018-044	1.56
Clarence has to deliver mail to his mysterious neighbor, Chalmers Santiago.
43	43	"Tuckered Boys"	John Bailey Owen; Nelson Boles, Spencer Rothbell, Tony Infante, and John Bailey Owen (story)	David Ochs and Henry Yu	July 22, 2015	1018-045	1.36
Clarence, Jeff and Sumo want to stay up all night to see a meteor shower, but their lack of sleep catches up with them and they begin to hallucinate.
44	44	"Water Park"	Tony Infante; Nelson Boles, Spencer Rothbell, and Tony Infante (story)	Kurt Dumas and Antony Mazzotta	July 23, 2015	1018-047	1.59
Clarence, Jeff and Sumo go to "Squirty's Moist Mountain Water Park". Clarence finds out the truth about his idol Squirty, while Jeff and Sumo wait in line for the Churd Churner.
45	45	"Where the Wild Chads Are"	Spencer Rothbell; Nelson Boles, Spencer Rothbell, and Tony Infante (story)	Niki Yang and Stephen P. Neary	July 24, 2015	1018-048	1.19
Chad takes Clarence camping; however, the trip goes wrong when an unhappy Clarence dumps all of the contents in Chad's backpack in the river hoping to see his wild side.
46	46	"Breehn Ho!"	Tony Infante; Nelson Boles, Spencer Rothbell, and Tony Infante (story)	Niki Yang and Stephen P. Neary	August 6, 2015	1018-043	1.46
Jeff invites Breehn to play a pirate-themed board game for the night. Tension spawns when Jeff and Breehn clash over with being captain.
47	47	"The Big Petey Pizza Problem"	John Bailey Owen; Nelson Boles, Spencer Rothbell, and Tony Infante (story)	Tiffany Ford and Michelle Xin	August 13, 2015	1018-049	1.38
Jeff celebrates his 10th birthday at the local bowling alley, but things go wrong when he realizes Gilben's party is happening at the same time.
48	48	"The Break Up"	Tony Infante; Nelson Boles, Spencer Rothbell, and Tony Infante (story)	Kyler Spears and Vitaliy Strokous	August 20, 2015	1018-050	1.57
After an argument, Jeff and Sumo vow to never speak to each other again, and Clarence attempts to get them back together, even if it means nearly killing them, but he only makes things worse.
49	49	"In Dreams"	Nelson Boles; Nelson Boles, Spencer Rothbell, David Ochs, Raymie Muzquiz, Sam Kremers-Nedell, and Tony Infante (story)	Vitaliy Strokous and Sam King	August 27, 2015	1018-051	1.17
Clarence is told to shut the garage door, but falls asleep and gets lost in the dreamworld.
50	50	"Balance"	Spencer Rothbell; Nelson Boles, Spencer Rothbell, and Tony Infante (story)	Tiffany Ford and Michelle Xin	September 3, 2015	1018-052	1.17
When a strange kid named Balance shows up to class one day and starts intimidating everyone, Clarence and Belson set out to expose the truth about him.
51	51	"Spooky Boo"	Tony Infante; Nelson Boles, Spencer Rothbell, and Tony Infante (story)	Melissa Juarez and Matthew Yang	October 27, 2015	1018-046	1.24
After Clarence leads Chelsea and Mavis through his homemade haunted house, Chelsea suggests they go to the local high school's haunted house for some real scares.

=== Season 2 (2016–17) ===
No. overall	No. in season	Title	Written by	Storyboarded by	Original release date	Prod. code	US viewers (millions)
52	1	"The Interrogation"	Spencer Rothbell; Nelson Boles, Spencer Rothbell, and Tony Infante (story)	Niki Yang and Stephen P. Neary	January 18, 2016	1037-053	1.35
When Mr. Reese's car is smeared with meatball sauce, he picks Clarence to help him find out who did it.
53	2	"Lost Playground"	Tony Infante; Spencer Rothbell, Tony Infante, and Sam Kremers-Nedell (story)	Jason Dwyer and Roy Camacho	January 18, 2016	1018-041	1.25
After the school playground equipment is taken away because it's deemed too dangerous, the kids try to find the old equipment.
54	3	"Bird Boy Man"	Tony Infante; Nelson Boles, Spencer Rothbell, and Tony Infante (story)	Tiffany Ford and Michelle Xin	January 19, 2016	1037-054	1.04
Sumo finds a bird whom he names Hot Sauce and nurses it back to health, but neglects everything else.
55	4	"Freedom Cactus"	Spencer Rothbell and Sam Kremers-Nedell; Nelson Boles, Spencer Rothbell, Tony Infante, and Sam Kremers-Nedell (story)	Tiffany Ford and Michelle Xin	January 20, 2016	1037-057	1.10
Clarence makes a comic about a cactus which becomes the #1 hit of the school.
56	5	"Plane Excited"	Sam Kremers-Nedell; Nelson Boles, Spencer Rothbell, Tony Infante, and Sam Kremers-Nedell (story)	Niki Yang and Stephen P. Neary	January 21, 2016	1037-055	1.06
Clarence finds fun on a plane to Florida and helps Chad get past his first ride.
57	6	"Escape from Beyond the Cosmic"	Tony Infante; Spencer Rothbell, Tony Infante, and Sam Kremers-Nedell (story)	Stu Livingston and Ray Xu	January 22, 2016	1037-058	1.29
Jeff tries to beat an arcade game at the laundromat, but when Clarence breaks it, he must find an alternative.
58	7	"Ren Faire"	Tony Infante; Nelson Boles, Spencer Rothbell, and Tony Infante (story)	Sam King and Vitaliy Strokous	January 28, 2016	1037-056	0.98
Clarence, Sumo and Jeff go to a Renaissance fair.
59	8	"Time Crimes"	Sam Kremers-Nedell; Spencer Rothbell, Tony Infante, and Sam Kremers-Nedell (story)	Sam King and Vitaliy Strokous	February 4, 2016	1037-059	1.11
After receiving a special watch from a cereal box, Clarence believes he can control time.
60	9	"Saturday School"	Tony Infante; Spencer Rothbell, Tony Infante, and Sam Kremers-Nedell (story)	Tiffany Ford and Michelle Xin	February 11, 2016	1037-061	1.06
Clarence, Jeff and Sumo have to clean up the school on a Saturday after creating an unapproved mural.
61	10	"Attack the Block Party"	Sam Kremers-Nedell; Spencer Rothbell, Tony Infante, and Sam Kremers-Nedell (story)	Mark Galez and Stu Livingston	February 18, 2016	1037-062	1.11
A high school party is investigated by Clarence, Jeff and Sumo, who think it's an alien invasion.
62	11	"Field Trippin'"	Tony Infante; Spencer Rothbell, Tony Infante, and Sam Kremers-Nedell (story)	Sam King and Vitaliy Strokous	February 25, 2016	1037-063	0.98
Clarence gets on the wrong school bus after taking a bathroom break on a field trip.
63	12	"Ice Cream Hunt"	Sam Kremers-Nedell; Spencer Rothbell, Tony Infante, and Sam Kremers-Nedell (story)	Katie Aldworth and Jason Dwyer	March 3, 2016	1037-064	1.18
Larry helps Clarence take the trio out for ice cream, but they go for the ride of their lives.
64	13	"Company Man"	Nick Cron-DeVico; Spencer Rothbell, Tony Infante, Sam Kremers-Nedell, and Nick Cron-DeVico (story)	Tiffany Ford and Michelle Xin	March 10, 2016	1037-065	0.91
Clarence loses the ball during a soccer game. He ends up following it into an office building, where he's mistaken for the boss's son.
65	14	"Stump Brothers"	Sam Kremers-Nedell; Spencer Rothbell, Tony Infante, and Sam Kremers-Nedell (story)	Stu Livingston and Mark Galez	March 17, 2016	1037-066	1.31
When Clarence and Sumo cause a power outage at Sumo's, they are sent with Sumo's brother, Tanner, to retrieve a generator part.
66	15	"The Tails of Mardrynia"	Tony Infante; Spencer Rothbell, Tony Infante, Sam Kremers-Nedell, and Stephen P. Neary (story)	Jason Dwyer, Katie Aldworth, and Stephen P. Neary	March 25, 2016	1037-068	1.05
Clarence becomes inspired to round up local animals to make an animal world like the one he read about in order to cheer up Percy.
67	16	"Clarence Wendle and the Eye of Coogan"	Tony Infante; Spencer Rothbell, Tony Infante, Sam Kremers-Nedell, and Stephen P. Neary (story)	Sam King and Vitaly Strokous	March 25, 2016	1037-071	1.05
Clarence and a few other students hunt for a lost treasure.
68	17	"Sneaky Peeky"	Tony Infante; Spencer Rothbell, Tony Infante, and Sam Kremers-Nedell (story)	Sam King and Vitaly Strokous	March 29, 2016	1037-067	0.99
After missing out on a chance to see the premiere of the new Robofrog movie, the trio devises a plan to sneak into the theater and catch a glimpse before anyone else. However, when they accidentally damage the reel, they're forced to fix it or fess up! Note: This episode was first released online on March 25, 2016.
69	18	"Game Show"	Sam Kremers-Nedell; Spencer Rothbell, Tony Infante, Sam Kremers-Nedell, and Stephen P. Neary (story)	Stu Livingston and Mark Galez	April 21, 2016	1037-070	1.01
Clarence and Breehn play a game show at the Aberdale Mall.
70	19	"Skater Sumo"	Sam Kremers-Nedell; Spencer Rothbell, Tony Infante, Sam Kremers-Nedell, and Stephen P. Neary (story)	Jason Dwyer and Katie Aldworth	April 28, 2016	1037-072	1.36
Sumo tries to build a skateboard and join Chelsea and Rita's skating team.
71	20	"Mystery Girl"	Tony Infante; Spencer Rothbell, Tony Infante, Sam Kremers-Nedell, and Stephen P. Neary (story)	Tiffany Ford and Michelle Xin	May 5, 2016	1037-073	0.97
Clarence finds a friend accidentally while making prank calls.
72	21	"The Substitute"	Sam Kremers-Nedell; Spencer Rothbell, Tony Infante, Sam Kremers-Nedell, and Stephen P. Neary (story)	Stu Livingston and Mark Galez	May 12, 2016	1037-074	1.09
A substitute teacher is a nervous wreck causes chaos, and Clarence must find Mrs. Baker to restore order.
73	22	"Classroom"	Tony Infante; Spencer Rothbell, Tony Infante, Sam Kremers-Nedell, and Stephen P. Neary (story)	Sam King and Ray Xu	May 19, 2016	1037-075	1.09
A day in the life in Ms. Baker's class is examined.
74	23	"Dullance"	Tony Infante; Spencer Rothbell, Tony Infante, Sam Kremers-Nedell, and Stephen P. Neary (story)	Katie Aldworth and Jason Dwyer	May 26, 2016	1037-076	1.07
Feeling burned out from having so many adventures, Clarence tries to spend a day sitting around, doing nothing.
75	24	"Jeff's Secret"	Sam Kremers-Nedell; Spencer Rothbell, Tony Infante, Sam Kremers-Nedell, and Stephen P. Neary (story)	Tiffany Ford and Michelle Xin	June 2, 2016	1037-077	1.38
Clarence learns that Jeff has an extra toe and Jeff begs Clarence to keep his secret, but Clarence is tempted to tell the school.
76	25	"Space Race"	Alan Hanson; Spencer Rothbell, Tony Infante, Sam Kremers-Nedell, and Stephen P. Neary (story)	Stu Livingston and Mark Galez	June 9, 2016	1037-078	1.13
Ms. Baker assigns a really fun class project. With Clarence distracted by the mysterious power of the moon, his class competes to build the highest-flying rocket.
77	26	"Plant Daddies"	Tony Infante; Spencer Rothbell, Tony Infante, Sam Kremers-Nedell, and Stephen P. Neary (story)	Sam King and Ray Xu	June 16, 2016	1037-079	1.32
The students of Aberdale Elementary must pair up in groups of 2 to raise small potted plants.
78	27	"Bucky and the Howl"	Tony Infante; Spencer Rothbell, Tony Infante, Sam Kremers-Nedell, and Stephen P. Neary (story)	Katie Aldworth and Jason Dwyer	June 23, 2016	1037-080	1.29
Sumo joins a musical and Clarence promotes the show, but Sumo catches stage fright on opening night.
79	28	"Worm Bin"	Sam Kremers-Nedell; Spencer Rothbell, Tony Infante, Sam Kremers-Nedell, and Stephen P. Neary (story)	Tiffany Ford and Michelle Xin	November 1, 2016	1037-081	0.77
When his mother gets him a worm bin, Jeff has to cope with the idea that he lives with the disgusting creatures, whilst Clarence breaks in to feed them every night.
80	29	"Clarence & Sumo's Rexcellent Adventure"	Ben Mekler; Spencer Rothbell, Tony Infante, Sam Kremers-Nedell, and Stephen P. Neary (story)	Stu Livingston and Mark Galez	November 2, 2016	1037-082	0.85
During a class trip to the museum, Clarence and Sumo play with a dinosaur tooth that has fallen from the mouth of a Tyrannosaurus rex skeleton. They sneak off an "imaginary adventure" to retrieve the tooth to the mouth. But they get busted for theft and Sumo is sent home as a punishment, leaving Clarence traumatized and worried, who believes he'll be arrested after the incident.
81	30	"Birthday"	Tony Infante; Spencer Rothbell, Tony Infante, Sam Kremers-Nedell, and Stephen P. Neary (story)	Sam King and Tim Rauch	November 3, 2016	1037-083	0.86
Clarence throws a birthday party, and everyone in their class shows up – much to the dismay of Jeff and Sumo.
82	31	"Tree of Life"	Joe Tracz; Spencer Rothbell, Tony Infante, Sam Kremers-Nedell, and Stephen P. Neary (story)	Katie Aldworth and Jason Dwyer	November 4, 2016	1037-084	0.89
Clarence, Sumo and Jeff climb a tree to carve their names on it.
83	32	"Capture the Flag"	Tony Infante; Spencer Rothbell, Tony Infante, Sam Kremers-Nedell, and Stephen P. Neary (story)	Stu Livingston, Mark Galez, Sam King, and Kyler Spears	November 14, 2016	1037-090	1.06
84	33	"Capture the Flag"	Tony Infante; Spencer Rothbell, Tony Infante, Sam Kremers-Nedell, and Stephen P. Neary (story)	Stu Livingston, Mark Galez, Sam King, and Kyler Spears	November 14, 2016	1037-091	1.06
In this half-hour special, Clarence and his friends play the biggest game of capture the flag yet and everyone wants to take home the crown and the power to control the neighborhood's juice boxes. But then things go unexpected when a new team assembles and takes over the juices.
85	34	"Cloris"	Ben Mekler; Spencer Rothbell, Tony Infante, Sam Kremers-Nedell, and Stephen P. Neary (story)	Tiffany Ford and Michelle Xin	November 15, 2016	1037-085	0.92
When Clarence goes with Jeff to visit Jeff's grandma, he befriends an aging woman named Cloris and is determined to remind her of her old self in order to convert the grumpy granny to his fun-loving ways.
86	35	"Fishing Trip"	Sam Kremers-Nedell; Spencer Rothbell, Tony Infante, Sam Kremers-Nedell, and Stephen P. Neary (story)	Stu Livingston and Mark Galez	November 16, 2016	1037-086	0.84
Mel learns that Chad has never taken Clarence fishing and decides to remedy this with a bonding trip for all the boys!
87	36	"Belson's Backpack"	Tony Infante; Spencer Rothbell, Tony Infante, Sam Kremers-Nedell, and Stephen P. Neary (story)	Katie Aldworth and Jason Dwyer	November 17, 2016	1037-088	1.08
After an accidental backpack swap, Clarence discovers that Belson is hiding an artistic side and attempts to foster Belson's creativity.
88	37	"Motel"	Sam Kremers-Nedell; Spencer Rothbell, Tony Infante, Sam Kremers-Nedell, and Stephen P. Neary (story)	Sam King and Tim Rauch	November 18, 2016	1037-089	1.00
Following an insect mishap, Clarence's house needs to be fumigated, forcing Mary, Chad and Clarence into a motel.
89	38	"Merry Moochmas"	Sam Kremers-Nedell; Spencer Rothbell, Tony Infante, Sam Kremers-Nedell, and Stephen P. Neary (story)	Tiffany Ford and Michelle Xin	December 1, 2016	1037-087	1.00
It's Christmas time in Aberdale and Clarence is convinced his winter wish for snow in Arizona will come true! However, his classmate Belson along with his grumpy cousin Gary "Mooch" are a little tougher to convince.
90	39	"Pizza Hero"	Nick Cron-DeVico; Spencer Rothbell, Tony Infante, Sam Kremers-Nedell, and Stephen P. Neary (story)	Jason Dwyer and Katie Aldworth	February 3, 2017	1037-092	0.93
It's the end of the school year, and as is tradition at Aberdale Elementary, Papa Marianio is slated to dish out his famous pizza along with a song and dance spectacle.

=== Season 3 (2017–18) ===
No. overall	No. in season	Title	Written by	Storyboarded by	Original release date July 1, 2018	Prod. code	US viewers (millions)
91	1	"Sumo Goes West"	Tony Infante; Spencer Rothbell, Tony Infante, Sam Kremers-Nedell, and Stephen P. Neary (story)	Tiffany Ford and Tyler Chen	February 10, 2017	1050-093	0.95
When Clarence learns his best friend Sumo may transfer to another school, he does everything in his power to try to stop the move. Note: From this episode onwards, Sumo goes to West Aberdale.
92	2	"Valentimes"	Tony Infante; Spencer Rothbell, Tony Infante, Sam Kremers-Nedell, and Stephen P. Neary (story)	Tiffany Ford and Arlyne Ramirez	February 10, 2017	1050-098	0.95
After finding out Ms. Baker does not have a Valentine, Clarence helps set her up with Mr. Mozer, Sumo's teacher from West Aberdale.
93	3	"Clarence for President"	Sam Kremers-Nedell; Spencer Rothbell, Tony Infante, Sam Kremers-Nedell, and Stephen P. Neary (story)	Sam King and Jon Feria	February 24, 2017	1050-097	0.85
Jeff enlists himself as Clarence's manager for class president in the 27th Aberdale Student Election.
94	4	"Rock Show"	Tony Infante; Spencer Rothbell, Tony Infante, Sam Kremers-Nedell, and Stephen P. Neary (story)	Stu Livingston and Mark Galez	February 24, 2017	1050-095	0.85
Chad's band, Dogmon, plays a show for the first time in years, giving Clarence and Mary a chance to really rock out.
95 96 97 98 99 100	5 6 7 8 9 10	"Clarence's Stormy Sleepover"	Tony Infante; Stephen P. Neary, Spencer Rothbell, Tony Infante, Sam Kremers-Nedell, and Nick Kocher (story)[Episodes1, 4 & 5 only] Sam Kremers-Nedell; Stephen P. Neary, Spencer Rothbell, Tony Infante, Sam Kremers-Nedell, and Nick Kocher (story)[Episode 3 only] Kelsy Abbott; Stephen P. Neary, Spencer Rothbell, Tony Infante, Sam Kremers-Nedell, and Nick Kocher (story) [Episodes 2 & 6 only]	Tiffany Ford and Arlyne Ramirez Nick Edwards and Mark Galez Sam King and Jon; Feria Katie Aldworth and Jason Dwyer Tiffany Ford and Arlyne Ramirez Nick Edwards and Mark Galez	June 5, 2017	1050-109 1050-110 1050-111 1050-112 1050-113 1050-114	0.96
Episode #1: The Phantom Clarence - Clarence plans to throw the sleepover to end all sleepovers with decorations, pillow fights and games, but there's one thing missing – guests. Clarence wants to invite all his friends, but finds that they might need some convincing. Episode #2: Jeffery Wendle - During the storm, Clarence goes out to get Jeff a raisin drink. While gone, Jeff has to stay in the house with Chad and Mary, and eventually goes crazy about having the house cleaned. They later set out to find Clarence. Episode #3: Badgers & Bunkers - During the power outage, Sumo and his family hide in a bunker. Him and his dad fight over whether Sumo's pet badger Candice should stay with them in the bunker. Episode #4: Dingus & McNobrain - Belson and Mr. Reese team up to find Miss Baker during the power outage. Episode #5: Bye Bye Baker - While trying to move away to California without telling Clarence, Miss Baker gets trapped in the store with Clarence, the Mayor, Meg (the substitute teacher) and one of Jeff's moms. The four get suspicious of Meg and try to leave the store. Episode #6: Flood Brothers - As the storm gets worse, everyone gets stuck in the school's gym and eventually fight. After Clarence gets them to get along, the big flood occurs and everyone works together to block the flood from entering the school.
101	11	"Pool's Out for Summer"	Tony Infante; Spencer Rothbell, Stephen P. Neary, Tony Infante, and Sam Kremers-Nedell (story)	Katie Aldworth and Jason Dwyer	June 6, 2017	1050-104	1.01
The boys go to the Aberdale Community Pool for a day of wet fun. Jeff wades in the shallow end; Sumo tries to conquer the diving board, redeeming himself from last summer's bellyflop; and Clarence sneaks past the lifeguards into the hot tub.
102	12	"Big Game"	Tony Infante; Spencer Rothbell, Tony Infante, Sam Kremers-Nedell, and Stephen P. Neary (story)	Katie Aldworth and Jason Dwyer	June 7, 2017	1050-108	0.80
At a baseball game that Belson's dad gave them tickets to, Chad, Clarence and Belson try to find ways to keep themselves entertained; Clarence tries to get the attention of a team's mascot.
103	13	"The Boxcurse Children"	Kelsy Abbott; Stephen P. Neary, Spencer Rothbell, and Tony Infante (story)	Sam King and Jon Feria	June 8, 2017	1050-115	0.98
Clarence, Sumo and Jeff believe that the contents of an antique box they found in the river may be cursed.
104	14	"Karate Mom"	Tony Infante; Spencer Rothbell, Tony Infante, Sam Kremers-Nedell, and Stephen P. Neary (story)	Mark Galez and Nick Edwards	June 12, 2017	1050-105	0.97
After surprising Clarence with martial arts classes at the Aberdojo, Mary gets talked into joining the class herself. But as she becomes more invested and interested in learning, Clarence drifts from the idea.
105	15	"Clarence Loves Shoopy"	Sam Kremers-Nedell; Spencer Rothbell, Tony Infante, Sam Kremers-Nedell, and Stephen P. Neary (story)	Stu Livingston and Mark Galez	June 13, 2017	1050-094	0.85
After realizing she's lonely, Clarence tries to become friends with Ms. Shoop. Many tries later he discovers Ms. Shoop makes beans and tries to get the entire city to try them.
106	16	"Public Radio"	Sam Kremers-Nedell; Spencer Rothbell, Tony Infante, Sam Kremers-Nedell, and Stephen P. Neary (story)	Tiffany Ford and Arlyne Ramirez	June 14, 2017	1050-106	0.86
After listening to a public radio broadcast during class, Clarence is inspired to record a radio interview of his own featuring his buddy Jeff.
107	17	"Chad and the Marathon"	Stephen P. Neary; Stephen P. Neary, Spencer Rothbell, and Tony Infante (story)	Katie Aldworth and Jason Dwyer	June 15, 2017	1050-116	0.93
When Chad realizes his lazy habits might be rubbing off on Clarence, he decides to participate in the Aberdale Marathon.
108	18	"Officer Moody"	Sam Kremers-Nedell; Spencer Rothbell, Tony Infante, Sam Kremers-Nedell, and Stephen P. Neary (story)	Sam King and Jon Feria	June 19, 2017	1050-099	1.02
Pieces of Mr. Reese's past are revealed when his old partner on the police force, Officer Moody, visits Aberdale Elementary.
109	19	"Gilben's Different"	Tony Infante; Spencer Rothbell, Tony Infante, Sam Kremers-Nedell, and Stephen P. Neary (story)	Katie Aldworth and Jason Dwyer	June 20, 2017	1050-100	0.95
Gilben's newly sprouted peach fuzz sparks a discussion about puberty that ultimately convinces Clarence to act more like an adult.
110	20	"Cool Guy Clarence"	Sam Kremers-Nedell; Spencer Rothbell, Stephen P. Neary, Tony Infante, and Sam Kremers-Nedell (story)	Sam King and Jon Feria	June 21, 2017	1050-101	0.83
Clarence meets a new friend who introduces him to a new lifestyle and a side of Aberdale he never knew about.
111	21	"Just Wait in the Car"	Sam Kremers-Nedell; Spencer Rothbell, Tony Infante, Sam Kremers-Nedell, and Stephen P. Neary (story)	Tiffany Ford and Arlyne Ramirez	June 22, 2017	1050-103	0.89
As Mary runs errands, Clarence waits in the car and struggles to fight boredom.
112	22	"Missing Cat"	Sam Kremers-Nedell; Spencer Rothbell, Tony Infante, Sam Kremers-Nedell, and Stephen P. Neary (story)	Katie Aldworth and Jason Dwyer	June 26, 2017	1050-096	0.86
When Chelsea's cat goes missing, she is hesitant to ask for help, but Clarence is determined to find the lost pet.
113	23	"Big Trouble in Little Aberdale"	Sam Kremers-Nedell; Spencer Rothbell, Tony Infante, Sam Kremers-Nedell, and Stephen P. Neary (story)	Sam King and Jon Feria	June 27, 2017	1050-107	0.96
After finding a mysterious new child in their neighborhood, Clarence, Jeff and Sumo show her around the town.
114	24	"Dare Day"	Sam Kremers-Nedell; Stephen P. Neary, Spencer Rothbell, Tony Infante, and Sam Kremers-Nedell (story)	Tiffany Ford and Arlyne Ramirez	June 28, 2017	1050-117	0.82
With Jeff on vacation in Spain, Sumo and Clarence challenge each other to increasingly absurd and extreme dares.
115	25	"The Trade"	Tony Infante; Spencer Rothbell, Tony Infante, Sam Kremers-Nedell, and Stephen P. Neary (story)	Nick Edwards and Mark Galez	June 29, 2017	1050-118	1.04
After he accidentally trades away Chad's favorite baseball card, Clarence transforms into a slick salesman to get it back.
116	26	"A Nightmare on Aberdale Street: Balance's Revenge"	Tony Infante; Stephen P. Neary, Spencer Rothbell, Tony Infante, and Kelsy Abbott (story)	Nick Edwards and Mark Galez	October 27, 2017	1050-122	0.84
Clarence uses a special jack-o'-lantern to enter people's dreams, and learns that something is causing his friends to have nightmares.
117	27	"Chadsgiving"	Kelsy Abbott; Stephen P. Neary, Spencer Rothbell, Tony Infante, and Kelsy Abbott (story)	Nick Edwards and Mark Galez	November 17, 2017	1050-126	0.69
Clarence is excited for Thanksgiving dinner with Chad's parents, but Chad worries that their bizarre customs will make him look irresponsible.
118	28	"A Sumoful Mind" (Note: This episode first aired in Hispanic America and Brazil on January 29, in Spain on April 7, in Germany on April 23, in Central and Eastern Europe on April 24, and Poland on April 27, 2018.)	Tony Infante; Stephen P. Neary, Spencer Rothbell, Tony Infante, Sam Kremers-Nedell, and Kelsy Abbott (story)	Sam King and Jon Feria	June 10, 2018	1050-119	0.37
When Jeff realizes Sumo's new classes have been rubbing off on Sumo, he attempts to further foster this newfound intellectual Sumo! But will Clarence's lowbrow antics reverse Jeff's hard work?
119	29	"Animal Day" (Note: This episode first aired in Hispanic America and Brazil on February 5, in Spain on April 7, in Germany on April 23, in Central and Eastern Europe on April 24, and in Poland on April 27, 2018.)	Sam Kremers-Nedell; Stephen P. Neary, Spencer Rothbell, Tony Infante, Sam Kremers-Nedell, and Kelsy Abbott (story)	Katie Aldworth and Jason Dwyer	June 10, 2018	1050-120	0.43
Clarence feels the call of the wild and decides to live a new life, free of the hustle and bustle of the modern world. Recruiting a few friends, Clarence sets out to find a new place to live his feral life, but quickly realises he lacks some basic survival skills.
120	30	"The Tunnel" (Note: This episode first aired in Hispanic America and Brazil on February 12, in Spain on April 8, in Germany on April 23, in Central and Eastern Europe on April 24, and in Poland on April 27, 2018.)	Vitaliy Strokous; Stephen P. Neary, Spencer Rothbell, Tony Infante, Sam Kremers-Nedell, Kelsy Abbott, and Vitaliy Strokous (story)	Tiffany Ford and Arlyne Ramirez	June 10, 2018	1050-121	0.34
After Clarence accidentally knocks Belson's new videogame down a storm drain, Belson enters a sewer tunnel to retrieve it.
121	31	"Talent Show" (Note: This episode first aired in Spain on April 14, in Germany on April 24, in Central and Eastern Europe on April 25, and in Poland on April 27, 2018.)	Kelsy Abbott; Stephen P. Neary, Spencer Rothbell, Tony Infante, and Kelsy Abbott (story)	Diana Lafyatis and Arlyne Ramirez	June 10, 2018	1050-125	0.36
Clarence throws a big talent show in his yard to showcase all the fun hidden talents of his friends.
122	32	"RC Car" (Note: This episode first aired in Spain on April 21, in Germany, Central, and Eastern Europe on April 26, and in Poland on April 28, 2018.)	Tony Infante; Spencer Rothbell, Stephen P. Neary, Tony Infante, and Kelsy Abbott (story)	Nick Edwards and Mark Galez	June 10, 2018	1050-130	0.39
Clarence spends a day outside with his toy RC Car, which he names Carla. Eventually convinced Carla has a mind of her own, he decides to follow her to new adventures.
123	33	"Dog King Clarence" (Note: This episode first aired in Hispanic America and Brazil on February 19, in Spain on April 8, in Germany, Central, and Eastern Europe on April 24, and in Poland on April 26, 2018.)	Kelsy Abbott; Stephen P. Neary, Spencer Rothbell, Tony Infante, and Kelsy Abbott (story)	Sam King and Jon Feria	June 17, 2018	1050-123	0.56
When Clarence's neighbor Gale recruits him to dog sit for her, he knows it will be a breeze; however, Gale's dog proves to be a little more challenging than he expects.
124	34	"Trampoline" (Note: This episode first aired in Hispanic America and Brazil on February 26, in Spain on March 14, in Germany on April 24, in Central and Eastern Europe on April 25, and in Poland on April 26, 2018.)	Kelsy Abbott; Stephen P. Neary, Spencer Rothbell, Tony Infante, and Kelsy Abbott (story)	Katie Aldworth and Jason Dwyer	June 17, 2018	1050-124	0.56
Mary buys a new trampoline for the family, but an accident lands her on the couch for a while. Determined to fight the boredom of being stuck indoors, she discovers her neighbor may be hiding something exciting.
125	35	"Clarence the Movie" (Note: This episode first aired in Spain on March 15, in Germany on April 25, and in Poland on April 27, 2018.)	Tony Infante; Stephen P. Neary, Spencer Rothbell, Tony Infante, and Kelsy Abbott (story)	Sam King and Jon Feria	June 17, 2018	1050-127	0.44
When Clarence starts to play around with his home video camera, he becomes increasingly drawn into the world of filmmaking.
126	36	"Belson Gets a Girlfriend" (Note: This episode first aired in Spain on April 21, in Germany, Central, and Eastern Europe on April 25, and in Poland on April 28, 2018.)	Tony Infante; Spencer Rothbell, Stephen P. Neary, Tony Infante, and Kelsy Abbott (story)	Katie Aldworth and Jason Dwyer	June 17, 2018	1050-128	0.44
Clarence is in disbelief when he learns his best friend Belson has a new girlfriend named Pipi. But when he observes their less than romantic behavior, he decides that he needs to teach them the ways of love to help keep their fling afloat!
127	37	"Brain TV" (Note: This episode first aired in Spain on April 21, in Germany, Central, and Eastern Europe on April 26, and in Poland on April 27, 2018.)	Tony Infante; Stephen P. Neary, Spencer Rothbell, Tony Infante, and Kelsy Abbott (story)	Sam King and Jon Feria	June 17, 2018	1050-131	0.39
After a marathon of classic sitcom episodes, Clarence becomes stuck as alter-ego "Clarry," an obnoxiously overacting sitcom version of himself. It's up to his friends and family to help him snap out of it, or face life with a new Clarence.
128	38	"Etiquette Clarence" (Note: This episode first aired in Spain on April 21, in Germany on April 25, in Central and Eastern Europe on April 26, and in Poland on April 27, 2018.)	Kelsy Abbott; Spencer Rothbell, Stephen P. Neary, Tony Infante, and Kelsy Abbott (story)	Derek Evanick and Arlyne Ramirez	June 24, 2018	1050-129	0.57
Clarence submits a short story into a writing contest. He's overjoyed when he learns he's accepted as a finalist! When Jeff finds out Clarence has to attend a formal dinner, he fixates on transforming the messy Clarence into a gentleman.
129	39	"Video Store" (Note: This episode first aired in Germany, Central, and Eastern Europe on April 26 and in Poland on April 27, 2018.)	Spencer Rothbell; Spencer Rothbell, Stephen P. Neary, Tony Infante, and Kelsy Abbott (story)	Derek Evanick and Arlyne Ramirez	June 24, 2018	1050-133	0.50
Clarence, Jeff, and Sumo visit their local video store to rent a movie, but discover it's all rented out! Each of them have a different idea of what tape to bring home, and must enlist the help of a tie breaker (a store clerk voiced by Brendon Small and resembling an adult version of his character from Home Movies) to figure it out.
130	40	"Anywhere but Sumo" (Note: This episode first aired in Germany, Central, and Eastern Europe on April 27, 2018.)	Tony Infante; Spencer Rothbell, Stephen P. Neary, Tony Infante, and Kelsy Abbott (story)	Katie Aldworth and Jason Dwyer	June 24, 2018	1050-132	0.50
On the few days leading up to summer break, Sumo and Clarence's hair cut anniversary (the day Clarence cut Sumo's hair from the pilot) is mentioned, Sumo agrees to let Clarence cut his hair, but on the day of their anniversary when Sumo's friends from his school cut his hair, Clarence gets betrayed and jealous by this, and finds out that Sumo may be starting to hang out with his friends more than him. However, with his many attempts to get with Sumo more, they all fail, and Clarence starts to get left out. Because Clarence believes summer is a "squillion miles away", he gets sad that he might not be able to spend more time with Sumo until summer, which Jeff reveals starts tomorrow. Clarence, happy by this, races to the couch they made their own earlier named Clarmaland and Clarence cuts Sumo's last hair that his friends missed. They all get together and watch in shock as Sumo's school is destroyed by the runaway bulldozer from "Sumo Goes West", cheering because Sumo and his friends no longer need to attend school. Clarence exclaims "Yes!" and the words "Thank you for watching" appear around him, ending the series.

== Shorts ==
No.	Title	Written and Storyboarded by	Original release date	Prod. code
1	"Beauford T. Pusser"	Niki Yang	July 6, 2015	1018-041A
In homage to the animated short Every Child, an orphan kitten (later named Beauford T. Pusser) makes its way from kid to kid until finally ending up with its owner, Ms. Baker.
2	"Have a Ball"	Stephen P. Neary	August 3, 2015	1018-041B
Percy invites Gilben over to his house to show him his ball collection.
3	"Big Boy"	Tiffany Ford	September 1, 2015	1018-041C
Clarence shows his classmates his fake chest hairs to prove he's more mature.
4	"Beach Blast"	Michelle Xin	April 5, 2016	1018-041D
Clarence, Sumo and Jeff have fun at the beach.
5	"Belson Touch"	Tiffany Ford	June 16, 2016	1037-069A
Clarence has a dream that everything he touches becomes Belson.
6	"Separation Anxiety"	Tiffany Ford	August 1, 2016	1037-069B
After talking, passing notes and throwing pencils at the ceiling in class, Ms. Baker separates Clarence and Sumo. They devise ways to communicate to each other from across the room in a series of gags.
7	"Beans"	Lindsay Small-Butera and Alex Small-Butera	September 12, 2016	1037-069D
Clarence takes a stroll to visit a dog named "Beans", but quickly discovers that not everything is what it seems.
8	"Sticky Clarence"	Guillermo Martinez	November 28, 2016	1037-069C
Everything Clarence comes into contact with sticks to his body – a pen, a can of beans, even one of his chickens. Eventually, Clarence becomes the center of a big ball of objects, à la Katamari Damacy.
9	"Claw Machine"	Michelle Xin	December 20, 2016	1037-069E
At the Pizza Swamp arcade, Clarence convinces passerby Vu to use his skills to free Clarence from the claw machine.
10	"Birding with Guyler"	Nick Edwards	May 26, 2017	1050-102A
Guyler spends a day bird watching in Bendle Park and makes a new special friend.
11	"Rainy Day"	Mark Galez	May 26, 2017	1050-102C
Clarence and his friends play in the rain and enjoy their cozy evenings with family.
12	"Clarencio Magnifico"	Mark Galez	July 21, 2017	1050-102D
Clarence performs a magic act for some of Aberdale's senior citizens.: Note: This short was published in the Cartoon Network Latin America's and Brazil YouTube channel on September 26, 2017.
13	"Doodle Battle"	Nick Edwards	June 24, 2018	1050-102B
Clarence and his friends found a piece of paper and have fun doodling on it.: Note: This short was published in the Cartoon Network Latin America's and Brazil YouTube channel on August 1, 2017.
14	"Lonely Lonnie"	Vitaliy Strokous	June 24, 2018	1050-102E
Clarence and his friends are telling scary stories, when something odd seems to happen to Jeff...: Note: This short was published in the Cartoon Network Africa's YouTube channel on March 9, 2018.
