= Anna Iberszer =

Polish actress and dancer (born 1976)

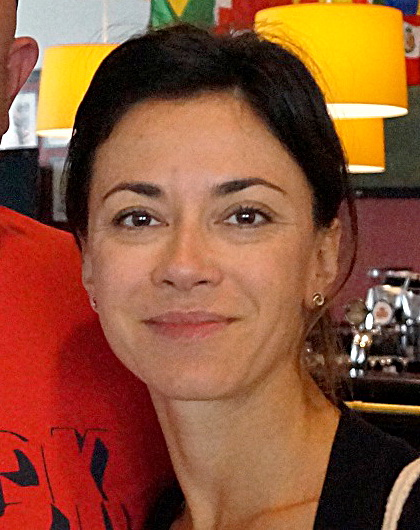
- Iberszer in 2018.
- Born: 22 March 1976 (age 50); Lublin, Poland
- Education: Chopin University of Music
- Occupations: Actress, dancer, choreographer, sound operator
- Years active: 1998–present
- Spouse: Tomasz Drabek
- Children: 1

Anna Iberszer (Polish: [ˈan.na iˈbɛr.ʂɛr]; born 22 March 1976), also known as Anna Iberszer-Drabek (Polish: [iˈbɛr.ʂɛr ˈdra.bɛk]), is a Polish actress, dancer, and choreographer. From 2005 to 2007, she portrayed Zuzanna Petersen, a recurring character on the TVP1 soap opera television series The Clan, and from 2005 to 2006, she portrayed Beatriz Moro, a recurring character on the Polsat drama television series Tango z aniołem. She was also a part of the recurring cast portraying Francesca Andreoni-Witebska on the TVP1 comedy series The Ranch from 2011 to 2015, and portraying Laura on TV4 and Super Polsat comedy drama series Święty from 2020 to 2022, and on its continuation Uroczysko from 2023 to 2024, aired on TV4 and Polsat. Furthermore, Iberszer also appeared in the feature films Ladies (2008) as Tsunami, in Hans Kloss: More Than Death at Stake (2012) as a television presenter, in Viva Belarus! (2012) as a Spanish television presenter, and in Bejbis (2022) as Hanka.

== Early life and education ==
Anna Iberszer was born on 22 March 1976 in Lublin, Poland. She is Polish with partial Italian descent from her maternal side. Her grandmother was from Cesenatico, Italy, where she met her grandfather, a Polish soldier of the Anders's Army, who settled there following the end of the Second World War. The couple later moved to Strzyżów, Poland. In 2000, Iberszer graduated from the Faculty of Directing at the Chopin University of Music in Warsaw, and in 2004, she finished the Halina and Jan Machulski's Acting School in Warsaw. In 2008, she passed an external exam in acting arts.

== Career ==
Iberszer worked as an audio engineer on the television series Marzenia do spełnienia (2001–2002), and on the feature films Chopin: Desire for Love (2002) and King Ubu (2003). From 2005 to 2007, she portrayed Zuzanna Petersen, a recurring character on the TVP1 soap opera television series The Clan, and from 2005 to 2006, she portrayed Beatriz Moro, a recurring character on the Polsat drama television series Tango z aniołem. She was also a part of the recurring cast portraying Francesca Andreoni-Witebska on the TVP1 comedy series The Ranch from 2011 to 2015, and portraying Laura on TV4 and Super Polsat comedy drama series Święty from 2020 to 2022, and on its continuation Uroczysko from 2023 to 2024, aired on TV4 and Polsat. Additionally, Iberszer appeared on the television series such as Sąsiedzi (2003), L for Love (2004), Oficer (2004), Father Matthew (2010), Warsaw Pact (2011), Na Wspólnej (2012, 2018), Friends (2015), The Lousy World (2016), W rytmie serca (2018), The Blonde (2019), Girls From Ukraine (2019), Komisarz Alex (2019, and Spider's Web (2021). She also appeared in the feature films Ladies (2008) as Tsunami, in Hans Kloss: More Than Death at Stake (2012) as a television presenter, in Viva Belarus! (2012) as a Spanish television presenter, and in Bejbis (2022) as Hanka.

Iberszer is also a stage actress, having perform in venues such as the Bielsko-Biała Polish Theatre, the Imka Theatre in Warsaw, the Polonia Theatre in Warsaw, the Siren Theatre in Warsaw, and the Warsaw National Theatre. Furthermore, she is a voice actress, having performed in a few Polish-language dubbing productions, including films Coco (2017), Little Door Gods (2017), and Venom: The Last Dance (2024), and television series Girl Meets World (2016), and Stretch Armstrong and the Flex Fighters (2017–2018). Iberszer is also a flamenco and argentine tango dancer, and a choreographer.

== Personal life ==
She is married to actor Tomasz Drabek, with whom she has a son, Karol.

== Filmography ==
=== Films ===
Year	Title	Role	Notes	Ref.
1998	Piechu	—N/a	Short film; sound operator	
1998	Pięć minut	—N/a	Short film; sound operator	
2002	AF 2046 DUR 02H20		Short film	
2002	Chopin: Desire for Love	—N/a	Feature film; sound operator	
2002	Hacker	—N/a	Feature film; sound editing	
2003	King Ubu	—N/a	Feature film; sound operator	
2006	Bez iluzji	Aki	Short film	
2008	Ladies	Tsunami	Feature film; actress and choreographer	
2009	The Perfect Guy for My Girlfriend		Feature film	
2009	Powidoki	Krystyna Krygier	Television play	
2011	Boska!	Maria	Television play	
2012	Hans Kloss: More Than Death at Stake	Television presenter	Feature film	
2012	Viva Belarus!	Spanish television presenter	Feature film	
2014	Nasza klasa	—N/a	Television play; choreographer	
2016	Top Girls		Short film; actress and director	
2018	Tacones		Short film	
2022	Bejbis	Hanka	Feature film	
2024	Zdążyć przed ciszą	Asia	Short film	

=== Television series ===
Year	Title	Role	Notes	Ref.
2001–2002	Marzenia do spełnienia	—N/a	Sound operator; 13 episodes	
2003	Sąsiedzi	Young Blanka Szczepanik	Episode: "Zimowy sen" (no. 22)	
2004	L for Love	Ela's friend	2 episodes	
2004	Oficer	Dancer	Episode: "Ludzie z miasta" (no. 2)	
2005–2007	The Clan	Zuzanna Petersen	Recurring role; 81 episodes	
2005–2006	Tango z aniołem	Beatriz Moro	Recurring role	
2006	Fałszerze. Powrót sfory		Episode no. 9	
2008	Doręczyciel	Karolina Kmiecik	Recurring role; 3 episodes	
2010	Father Matthew	Romani woman	Episode: "Największa" (no. 33)	
2010	Ludzie Chudego		Episode no. 9	
2011	Warsaw Pact	Dominika	Episode no. 6	
2011–2013	Na dobre i na złe	Nurse Ania	Recurring role; 21 episodes	
2011–2016	The Ranch	Francesca Andreoni-Witebska	Recurring role; 33 episodes	
2012	Na Wspólnej	Woman	6 episodes	
2015	Friends	Dance instructor	Episode no. 61	
2015	Na dobre i na złe	Nurse Marta	3 episodes	
2016	The Lousy World	Lady	Episode: "Baśń z tysiąca i jednej nocy" (no. 502)	
2017	Koty i zaloty	—N/a	Television series; choreographer	
2018	Na Wspólnej	Dancer	Episode no. 2779	
2018	W rytmie serca	Dance instructor	Episode: "Czarna owca" (no. 28)	
2019	The Blonde	Zofia's friend	Episode: "Zofia" (no. 94)	
2019	Girls From Ukraine	Prison guard	Episode: "Wszystko się sypie" (no. 47)	
2019	Komisarz Alex	Consuela Agilar	Episode: "Zabójcze tango" (no. 61)	
2020–2022	Święty	Laura	Recurring role; 159 episodes	
2021	Spider's Web	Ruta Espina	Episode no. 3	
2023–2024	Uroczysko	Laura	Recurring role; 65 episodes	

=== Polish-language dubbing ===
Year	Title	Role	Notes	Ref.
2012	Puss in Boots: The Three Diablos	Princess Alessandra Bellagamba	Short film	
2016	Girl Meets World	Señora Feinstein-Chang	Television series; episode: "Girl Meets Permanent Record" (no. 55)	
2017	Coco	Additional voices	Feature film	
2017	Little Door Gods	Background voices	Feature film	
2017–2018	Stretch Armstrong and the Flex Fighters	Miya Kimanyan	Television series; recurring role; 14 episodes	
2024	Venom: The Last Dance	Nova Moon	Feature film	

=== Audio plays ===
Year	Title	Role	Notes	Ref.
2024–2025	Toń	Anka	Audio series; 13 episodes	

== Theatre credits ==
Year	Title	Role	Venue	Director	Notes	Ref.
2001	Giacomo Joyce	Dancer	Warsaw National Theatre (Warsaw, Poland)	Jerzy Grzegorzewski	—N/a	
2001	Nad złotym stawem	—N/a	Zygmunt Hübner Popular Theatre (Warsaw, Poland)	Zbigniew Zapasiewicz	Audio engineer	
2001	Sen nocy letniej	Elf	Warsaw National Theatre (Warsaw, Poland)	Jerzy Grzegorzewski	—N/a	
2003	Letnicy	—N/a	Aleksander Zelwerowicz National Academy of Dramatic Art (Warsaw, Poland)	Eugeniusz Korin	Choreographer	
2003	Tango Gombrowicz	—N/a	Helena Modrzejewska National Old Theatre (Kraków, Poland)	Mikołaj Grabowski	Choreographer	
2006	Carmen TV	Carmen	Sacrum Profanum Festival (Kraków, Poland)	Jarosław Staniek	—N/a	
2006	Malambo	—N/a	Gustaw Holoubek Dramatic Theatre (Warsaw, Poland)	Ondrej Spišák	Choreographer	
2006	Tango operita: szare kwiaty	Astoria III	Siren Theatre (Warsaw, Poland)	Jarosław Staniek	—N/a	
2007	Boska!	Maria	Polonia Theatre (Warsaw, Poland)	Andrzej Domalik	—N/a	
2007	Tango moja miłość		Studio Buffo (Warsaw, Poland)		—N/a	
2007	Tango Piazzolla	—N/a	Juliusz Słowacki Theatre (Kraków, Poland)	Józef Opalski	Choreographer	
2007	Tangomania		Studio Buffo (Warsaw, Poland)		—N/a	
2008	Bóg	—N/a	Polonia Theatre (Warsaw, Poland)	Krystyna Janda	Choreographer	
2008	Frida K.	—N/a	Bielsko-Biała Polish Theatre (Bielsko-Biała, Poland)	Bartłomiej Wyszomirski	Choreographer	
2008	Maestro	—N/a	Aleksander Zelwerowicz National Academy of Dramatic Art (Warsaw, Poland)	Anna Smolar	Choreographer	
2009	Bagdad Café		Polonia Theatre (Warsaw, Poland)	Krystyna Janda	—N/a	
2010	Flamenco namiętnie		Polonia Theatre (Warsaw, Poland)		—N/a	
2010	Nasza klasa	—N/a	Tadeusz Łomnicki Wola Theatre (Warsaw, Poland)	Ondrej Spišák	Choreographer	
2010	Plac Apokalipsa	—N/a	Gustaw Holoubek Dramatic Theatre (Warsaw, Poland)	Michael Marmarinos	Choreography consultant	
2010	Testament cnotliwego rozpustnika		Kamienica Theatre (Warsaw, Poland)	Emilian Kamiński	Also a choreographer	
2011	Koziołek Matołek	—N/a	Tadeusz Łomnicki Wola Theatre (Warsaw, Poland)	Ondrej Spišák	Movement specialist	
2011	Mistrz & Małgorzata Story	Małgorzata	Bielsko-Biała Polish Theatre (Bielsko-Biała, Poland)	Robert Talarczyk	—N/a	
2011	Mistrz & Małgorzata Story	Natasza	Bielsko-Biała Polish Theatre (Bielsko-Biała, Poland)	Robert Talarczyk	—N/a	
2011	Proces	Janitor woman	Bielsko-Biała Polish Theatre (Bielsko-Biała, Poland)	Jacek Bała	—N/a	
2011	Sługa dwóch panów	—N/a	Stefan Żeromski Theatre (Kielce, Poland)	Bartłomiej Wyszomirski	Movement specialist	
2011	Strategia motyli	—N/a	Juliusz Słowacki Baltic Dramatic Theatre (Koszalin, Poland)	Zdzisław Derebecki	Choreographer	
2011	Tango Nuevo	—N/a	Stefan Jaracz Theatre (Olsztyn, Poland)	Giovanny Castellanos	Choreographer, scriptwriter	
2011	Tango Nuevo	—N/a	Danuta Baduszkowa Musical Theatre (Gdynia, Poland)	Giovanny Castellanos	Choreographer, scriptwriter	
2012	Kopciuszek	—N/a	Polonia Theatre (Warsaw, Poland)	Maria Ciunelis	Movement specialist	
2012	Madame	—N/a	Tadeusz Łomnicki Wola Theatre (Warsaw, Poland)	Jakub Krofta	Choreography consultant	
2012	W kręgu namiętności. Tango Piazzolla	—N/a	Witold Gombrowicz Municipal Theatre (Gdynia, Poland)	Józef Opalski	Choreographer	
2013	Don Juan w Warszawie		Fire in a Brothel (Warsaw, Poland)	Michał Walczak	—N/a	
2013	Kamasutra	—N/a	Gustaw Holoubek Dramatic Theatre (Warsaw, Poland)	Aldona Figura	Choreography	
2013	Młody Stalin. Prawdopodobna historia	—N/a	Gustaw Holoubek Dramatic Theatre (Warsaw, Poland)	Ondrej Spišák	Choreographer	
2013	Zorro		Comedy Theatre (Warsaw, Poland)	Tomasz Dutkiewicz	—N/a	
2014	Bromba w sieci	—N/a	6th Floor Theatre (Warsaw, Poland)	Maciej Wojtyszko	Choreographer	
2014	Kupiec wenecki	—N/a	Gustaw Holoubek Dramatic Theatre (Warsaw, Poland)	Aldona Figura	Movement Specialist	
2014	Upadłe anioły	—N/a	Och-Theatre (Warsaw, Poland)	Krystyna Janda	Choreography consultant	
2015	Barbarzyńcy	—N/a	Aleksander Zelwerowicz National Academy of Dramatic Art (Warsaw, Poland)	Adam Sajnuk	Choreographer	
2015	Gorączka powstańczej nocy. Ostateczne starcie	—N/a	Fire in a Brothel (Warsaw, Poland)	Michał Walczak	Choreographer	
2015	Raj dla opornych	—N/a	Coast Theatre (Gdynia, Poland)	Krystyna Janda	Choerographer	
2015	Raj dla opornych	—N/a	Polonia Theatre (Warsaw, Poland)	Krystyna Janda	Choerographer	
2016	Café Luna	—N/a	Witold Gombrowicz Municipal Theatre (Gdynia, Poland)	Józef Opalski	Movement specialist	
2016	Lekcje stepowania	Mavis	Och-Theatre (Warsaw, Poland)	Krystyna Janda	—N/a	
2016	Niedźwiedź Wojtek	—N/a	Gustaw Holoubek Dramatic Theatre (Warsaw, Poland)	Ondrej Spišák	Choreographer	
2016	Pozory mylą	Nancy	Agencja Artystyczna Certus (Częstochowa, Poland)	Gabriel Gietzky	—N/a	
2016	Tango 3001	—N/a	Boto Theatre (Sopot, Poland)	Giovanny Castellanos	Songwriter	
2017	Byk Ferdynand		Imka Theatre (Warsaw, Poland)	Tomasz Karolak	Also a choreographer	
2017	Historia Jakuba	—N/a	Gustaw Holoubek Dramatic Theatre (Warsaw, Poland)	Ondrej Spišák	Movement specialist	
2019	Almodovaria	—N/a	Polonia Theatre (Warsaw, Poland)	Anna Wieczur-Bluszcz		
2020	Człowiek z La Manchy	—N/a	Gustaw Holoubek Dramatic Theatre (Warsaw, Poland)	Anna Wieczur-Bluszcz	Choreographer	
2021	Ludzie, miejsca i rzeczy	—N/a	Aleksander Zelwerowicz National Academy of Dramatic Art (Warsaw, Poland)	Anna Wieczur-Bluszcz	Movement specialist	
2021	Wieczór Panieński plus		MY Theatre (Warsaw, Poland)	Maria Seweryn	—N/a	
2022	Sztuka intonacji	—N/a	Gustaw Holoubek Dramatic Theatre (Warsaw, Poland)	Anna Wieczur-Bluszcz	Movement specialist	
2022	Madame	—N/a	Gustaw Holoubek Dramatic Theatre (Warsaw, Poland)	Jakub Krofta	Choreography consultant	
2022	Róża w krainie łobuzów	Mother	Imka Theatre (Warsaw, Poland)	Michał Barczak	Also a direction supervisor and choreographer	
2022	Amadeusz	—N/a	Gustaw Holoubek Dramatic Theatre (Warsaw, Poland)	Anna Wieczur-Bluszcz	Movement specialist	
2023	Czerwone nosy	—N/a	Wojciech Bogusławski Theatre (Kalisz, Poland)	Anna Wieczur-Bluszcz	Choreographer and movement specialist	
2023	María de Buenos Aires		Lentz Villa (Szczecin, Poland)		—N/a	
2024	Rodzinne piekiełko		MY Theatre (Warsaw, Poland)	Maria Seweryn	—N/a	
2024	Amadeusz	—N/a	Stefan Jaracz Theatre (Łódź, Poland)	Anna Wieczur-Bluszcz	Movement specialist	
2025	Extasy Show	—N/a	Polonia Theatre (Warsaw, Poland)	Tomasz Man	Movement specialist	
