= Karolina Czarnecka =

Polish singer and actress

- Czarnecka in 2014

Background information
- Born: Karolina Czarnecka
- Occupations: Singer; actress
- Instrument: Vocals
- Years active: 2014–present

Karolina Czarnecka (born Sokółka, October 29 1989) is a Polish singer and actress. She rose to prominence in 2014 with her Polish cover of "Heroin and Cocaine" by The Tiger Lillies.

== Background ==
Czarnecka studied puppetry in Białystok and acting in Warsaw.

== Career ==
In 2014, Czarnecka performed the Polish cover of "Heroin and Cocaine" by The Tiger Lillies at the 35th Stage Song Review in Wrocław, titled "Hera koka hasz LSD". It gained traction on social media. In the same year, she released her debut EP Córka, which featured "Hera koka hasz LSD".

In 2016, she made her debut by acting and dancing in Polish film "#WSZYSTKOGRA".

In 2017, Czarnecka co-founded the band Gang Śródmieście. She is also a member of Żelazne Waginy and helped co-found the cabaret group Pożar w Burdelu. The following year, she released her sophomore album Solarium 2.0.

In 2019, she performed at the Pol'And'Rock Festival. In the same year, she released her album Cud. She also acted in 2019 film "Sługi wojny" as the villain, Olga.

Czarnecka performing at the Pol'And'Rock Festival

In 2021, she launched her musical project Córy, in which she launched workshops for teenage girls. Czarnecka performed alongside the Skowronki Girl's choir at the Malta Festival as a campaign.

She released her album Matka in 2025. Matka took influences from punk music and rap. It featured the singles "Licho" and "Offline".

In 2026, she entered Poland's National Final in Eurovision Song Contest 2026, Finał krajowych kwalifikacji, with the entry "Jedna Chwila". She later withdrew from the national final due to Israel's participation in the Eurovision that year.

In the same year, she released her three-concert musical project Potupaja, in November 2026. The project was a collaboration with DJ Zuzanna Ossowska, and featured electronica, folk and techno.

== Personal life ==
Czarnecka stated that she used drugs. At age twenty-six she attended rehabilitation and therapy. In 2022, she had her daughter, Józefina.

== Discography ==
=== Albums ===
- Solarium 2.0 (2018)
- Cud (2019)
- Matka (2025)

=== EP ===
- Córka (2014)

=== Singles ===
- "Licho" (2025)
- "Offline" (2025)
- "Jedna Chwila" (2026)

== Filmography ==
=== Film ===
- #WSZYSTKOGRA (2016)
- Sługi wojny (2019)

=== TV ===
- Finał krajowych kwalifikacji (2026)
