= Lena Piękniewska =

Polish singer (born 1980)

Lena Piękniewska (born Lena Bem; July 25, 1980 in Poznań) is a Polish singer.

== Education ==
She graduated from Academy of Fine Arts in Poznań. As a fourteen-year-old she sang at Piwnica pod Baranami in Kraków, and began her professional music career in 2004. In 2005, she won the 41st Student Song Festival in Kraków. A year later she won the first place at Castle Meeting in Olsztyn and won a competition for the interpretation of songs by Agnieszka Osiecka during the Remember the Osiecka festival. In 2007 she received Marek Grechuta scholarship, and in 2008 she received the Artistic City of Poznań scholarship for achievement in the field of song. In the same year, she supported jazz vocalist Stacey Kent on her concert tour.

== Music career ==
In 2010 she released her debut studio album entitled Wyspa (Island). In the same year she traveled to Berlin where she they took part in workshops led by Daan van Kampenhout. It inspired her to write cycle of songs Kołysanki na wieczny sen (Lullabies for the eternal sleep) consisting of fourteen tracks sung in Hebrew and in Polish. Premiere concert took place during the Tzadik Festival in Poznan and in the beginning of October 2012 she published studio album of the same name recorded with a jazz quartet. In the same year she became an actress in Warsaw cabaret Pożar w Burdelu. In August 2014, she sung songs from the album Lullaby for eternal sleep during the Festival of Jewish Culture in Warsaw. In 2015, she performed at the National Festival of Polish Song in Opole as part of the concert commemorating the 100th anniversary of birth of Jeremi Przybora. During that concert she sang the song Nie pamiętam from the repertoire of Kalina Jędrusik.

== Reception ==
She is noted as being close to poetry and jazz. Her first album "Wyspa" contained very nostalgic songs, lullabies, bossa nova, and jazz with excellent lyrics. Her latter repertoire touches on current aspects of Polish social scene including feminist movement and Polish-Jewish relationships.

=== Feminism ===
She is a member of the Polish feminist punk group Żelazne Waginy which combines lyrical ballads with contemporary protest songs. In an interview she states that the group comments on current political situation in Poland and that it has appeal to girls of all ages who come to us and for whom our performances are of value and who can laugh at what is difficult, terrifying, fearful and painful. The group publishes their own CDs.

=== Jewish traces ===
Her songs from the album Lullabies for the eternal sleep were written by her and inspired by the traditional Jewish music. Critic notes that she can bring room to total silence when singing her songs, for example the one about Jewish political and social activist Mark Edelman's mural, for which the home association wanted money to be displayed on their house. The reviewer of her Pół na pół concert states that she is well known artists [..] whose music, while rather modest, is devoid of fireworks, and is revealing what's most important - the truth. Another critic notes that the most special concert was Lullabies for eternal sleep dedicated to a vanished Jewish district in Poznań where the synagogue was transformed into a swimming pool. She was a star guest during the memorial days for Holocaust victims at a gala concert in Łódź where she presented works written by the young poets from Jewish ghettos in Poland. Her 2016 project is called Coś przyjdzie: miłość lub wojna (Something will come - love or war). It is a tribute to children's poetry from the time of Holocaust including poems by Abraham Koplowicz, Zuzanna Ginczanka, Janka Hescheles, and Abraham Cytryn. It premiered in 2016 during the Festival of Jewish Culture in Warsaw. These projects are unique in Poland in which large population of Jewelry vanished in the Holocaust.

== Discography ==
- Wyspa (The Island) (MCA Music, 2010)
- Kołysanki na wieczny sen (Lullabies for eternal rest) (Opensources, 2012) with Soundcheck jazz quartet
- Her songs are recorded on several CDs from Pożar w burdelu performances
- Her songs are recorded on CDs from Żelazne waginy performances
