= Nick Pitera =

American vocal artist (born 1986)

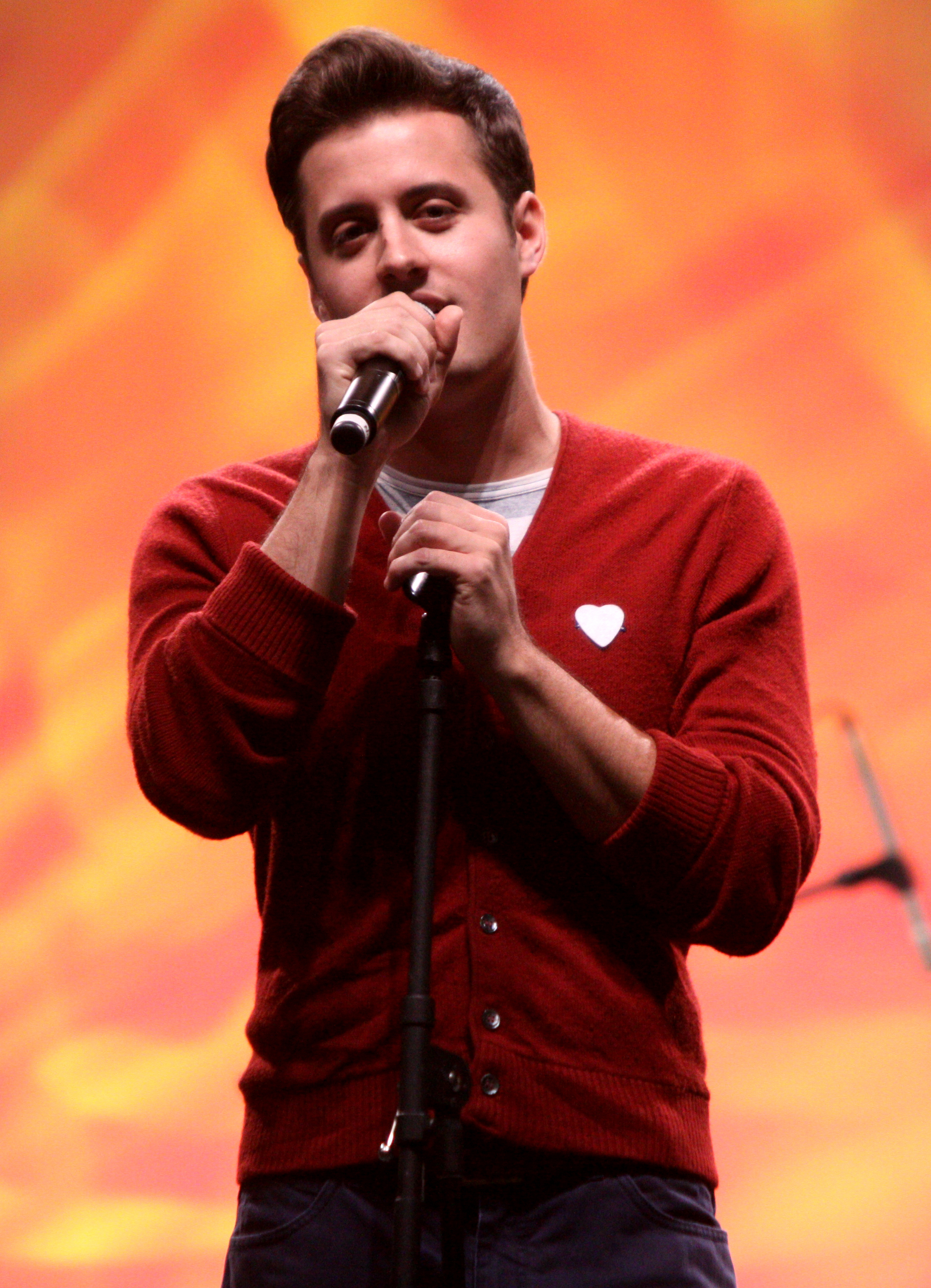
- Pitera at VidCon in 2012

Background information
- Born: Nicholas Joseph Pitera; March 7, 1986 (age 40); Woodbury, Minnesota, U.S.
- Occupations: Singer-songwriter; musician; animator
- Instrument: Vocals
- Years active: 2007–present
- Website: Nick Pitera's channel on YouTube

Nicholas Joseph Pitera (born March 7, 1986) is an American singer, animator and YouTuber. As of 11 May 2009, Pitera worked as a 3D Modeler at Pixar Studios. Pitera sang the Triple Dent Gum jingle in Pixar's Inside Out. He was also known as the singing voice of Clarence from 2014's Clarence.

== Career ==
Nick Pitera is a baritone. Pitera gained his popularity for his extensive vocal range and his unusual feminine falsetto, as he first demonstrated in his most popular video, a cover of "A Whole New World", from the movie Aladdin where he sang both Aladdin and Jasmine's parts.

In 2011, Pitera released "One Man Disney Movie" using a "'Brady Bunch'-style grid" to perform "an eight-minute-plus mashup of songs from various big-screen musical fairy tales, from "Beauty and the Beast" to "Enchanted," taking on the roles of the heroes, heroines, villains, sidekicks and their furry choirs."

In 2012, Pitera released a medley cover of Andrew Lloyd Webber songs entitled "One Man Phantom of the Opera."

Pitera has also appeared on The Ellen DeGeneres Show as one of the audience acts. He sang "A Whole New World" from Disney, with himself singing both Jasmine's and Aladdin's parts.

He released his first self-written original single album called "Better Days" on iTunes and Amazon on December 4, 2012. He released an EP of five original songs in 2015.

For his work on Onward, Pitera was jointly nominated in 2021 for a VES Award in the category Outstanding Created Environment in an Animated Feature. He also performed "TripleDent Gum Jingle" song with Andrea Datzman for Inside Out 2.
