= Fire in a Brothel =

Polish political and literary cabaret

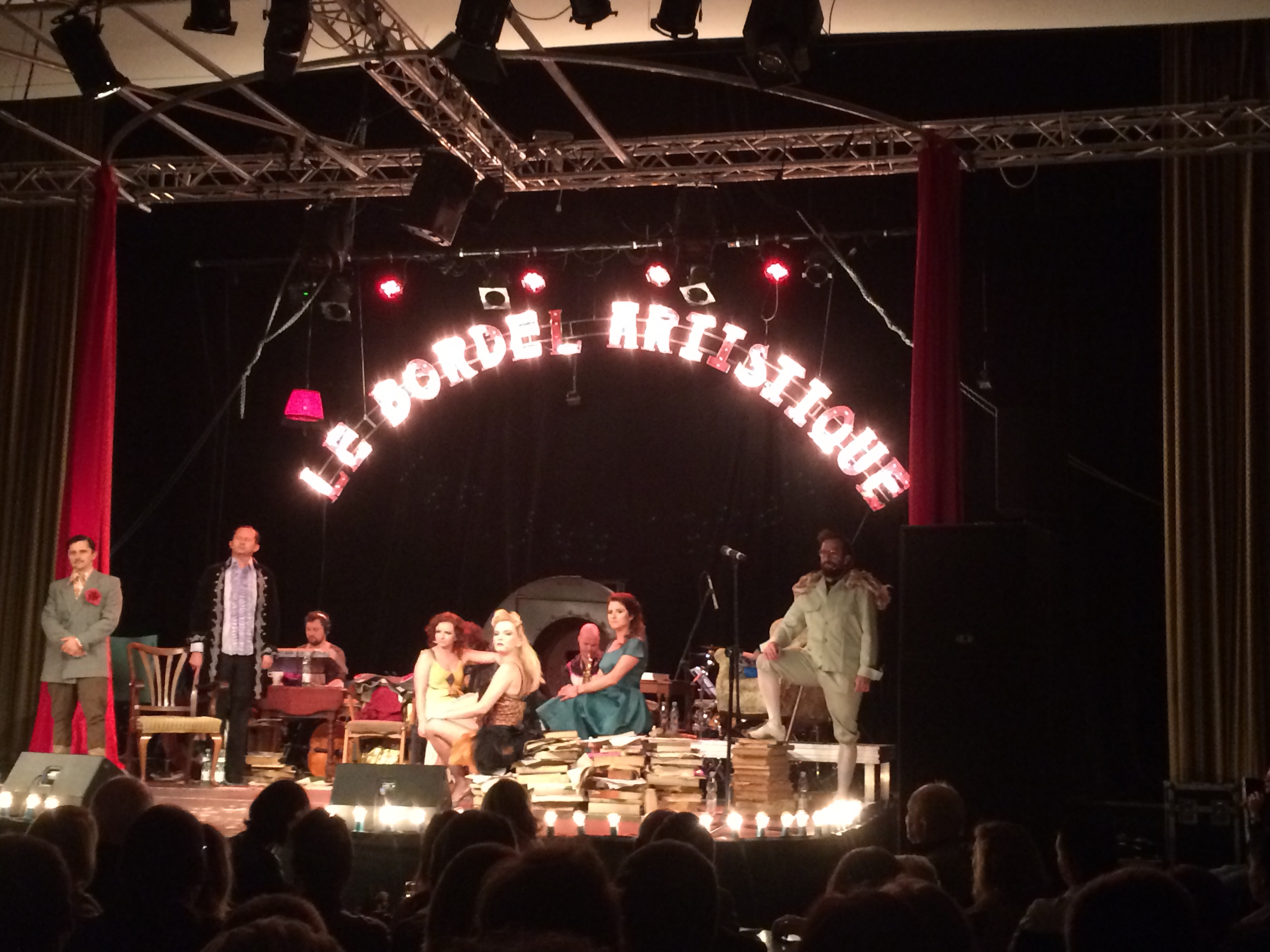
Fire in the brothel - Polish cabaret in WarSawa theatre

Fire in the brothel (Pożar w Burdelu, PwB) is a Polish political and literary cabaret commenting on contemporary social and political events. It was established in Warsaw in September 2012. It is also involved in animation of the cultural life in Warsaw's Praga shore of the Vistula and gives performances for children.

== History ==
It was established in September 2012 by playwright Michał Walczak and historian Maciej Łubieński. They debuted on stage of the Klub Komediowy Chłodna (Comedy Club on the Cool Street). In that time its audience was rather limited as the Cool Street Comedy Club was small. In 2015, the cabaret applied to the Polish Patent Office that the name PwB is registered as a trademark, but the name was considered too controversial. The band released an album of songs from the show Saturday Night Uprising in 2014. In 2016 it moved to Warsaw Praga district. The cabaret characters represent a spectrum of political attitudes in Poland. Team members conduct independent programs and stand-ups: Catholic Stand-up, Iron Vaginas, Brothel TV, Therapist of the City. In 2016, the cabaret artists joined the Święto Placu Hallera (Haller's Square Festival) with performances of the I Festiwal Magii i Ściemy (Premier Festival of Magic and Bullshit). It is one of the most popular Polish contemporary satirical cabarets.

== Mise-en-scène ==
There are about 10-15 actors and musicians during each performance of Fire in the Brothel. Like other cabarets of its genre such as Saturday Night Live the PwB presents scenes (songs, stand-up) commenting on contemporary life and like other Polish cabarets (e.g. Kabaret Olgi Lipińskiej) they are related to social events in Warsaw and political scene in Poland. The cabaret characters include an announcer, The Brothel Father (Burdeltata), there is Madame (Burdelmama), Pastor of Hipsters (Duszpasterz Hispsterów), Doctor Fak who deals with erotic energy of Warsaw, neurotic varsovienne Paula of Wilanów, nationalists - Rainbow Arsonist (Podpalacz tęczy) and Etno, Culture (Kultura), The City Mayor HGW, and Girls of Charlotte (Dziewczyny z Charlotte). The audience follows their lives, transformations and conflicts through monologues, songs and skits. There are often ironic allusions to political and cultural events presented with absurd humor, vulgarity mixed with lyricism. On occasion PwB borders on burlesque with performances of a stripper Betty-Q or Nasty Illusionist Menello.

== Related shows ==
Members of the Fire in Brothel are involved in several related live shows and broadcast them through community media such as Facebook and YouTube .

=== Catholic Stand-up ===
In this "Catholic stand-up" (available on YouTube) Brothel Father (Burdeltata) is playing pastor of the Hipster-Reformed Church and preaches on contemporary social events.

=== Sex Therapy ===
Independent stand-up of Doctor Fak. In this show Doctor Fak is a therapist of Warsaw who works on the Wild Shore of the Vistula River. Dr. Janusz Fak examines sexual energy of the city. For example, he resolves the problem of a large phallus, whether it should be loosened or not. Dr. Fak is rather unethical therapist sleeping with his female patients although in such a case he temporarily discontinues the treatment.

=== Iron vagina ===
In 2016 a group of "Iron Vaginas" composed of actresses Paula, Etno, Charlotte and the Wild Agnes started to comment on family policy in Poland, reproductive rights of women and about problems with breastfeeding in public (the song goes Tell me, baby, tell me, baby / Do you have a problem with public sucking?).

=== Brothel TV ===
Available on YouTube since 2016 satirical clips from the Polish parliament. One such clips deals with satirical take on current social discussion in Poland around issue of abortion .

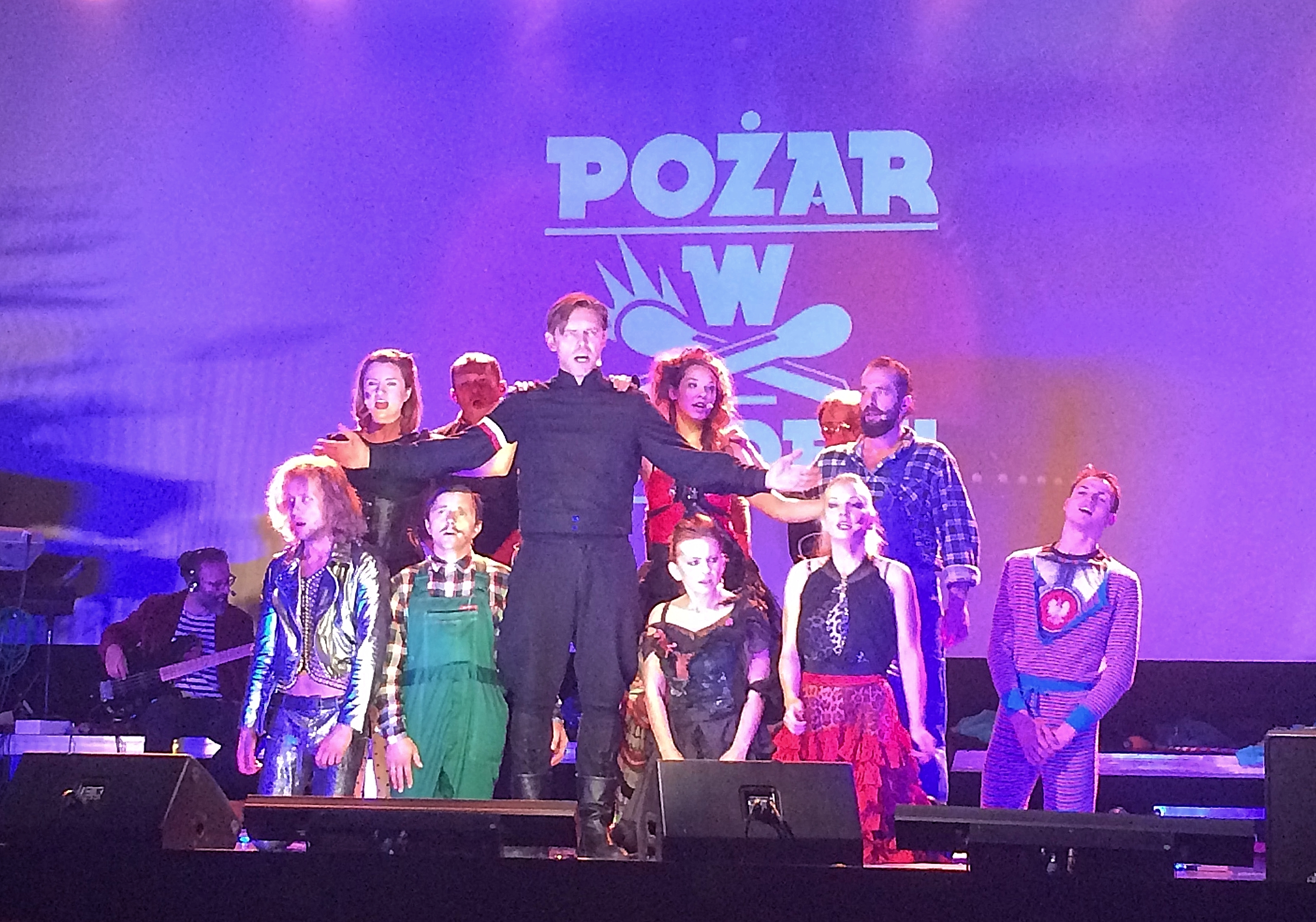
Fire in the Brothel during the 31 part of the show Demony Żoliborza - horror inteligencki (Demons of Zoliborz - Humor of the Intelligentsia Class)

== Actors ==
Burdel Ensemble (BurdelTrupa): Monika Babula, Karolina Czarnecka, Magdalena Łaska, Maria Maj, Lena Piękniewska, Agnieszka Przepiórska, Betty Q, Anna Smołowik, Przemysław Bluszcz, Tomasz Drabek, Bartosz Figurski, Oskar Hamerski, Andrzej Konopka, Mariusz Laskowski, Wojan Trocki.

Cirque du Bordel: Magdalena Kisiała, Krzysztof Kostera, Kamil Witkowski, Izabela Zielińska, Maciej Najmowicz

BurdelBand (music): Michał Górczyński/Bolo Jezierski, Maciej Łubieński, Wiktor Stokowski, Marcin Wippich

Guests: Anna Mierzwa, Andrzej Seweryn, Lidia Sadowa, Natalia Sikora, Paweł Ciołkosz, Marcin Jędrzejewski, Paweł Krucz, Wojciech Błach, Magdalena Kisiała i Izabela Zielińska, Sławomir Kowalski – Iluzjonista Menello, Paweł Aigner, Karolina Bacia.
