= Skyler Page =

American animator

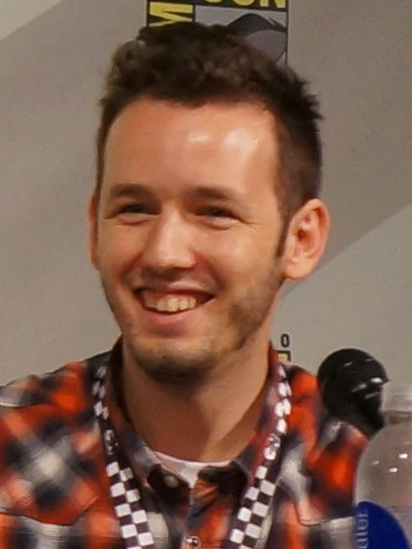
- Page at San Diego Comic-Con in July 2013
- Born: Skyler Dale Page; October 13, 1989 (age 37); Phoenix, Arizona, U.S.
- Education: California Institute of the Arts
- Occupations: Animator, voice actor
- Years active: 2006–2016 (Note: On indefinite hiatus)
- Employer: Cartoon Network Studios (2011-2014)
- Known for: Clarence
- Website: Skylerdalepage.com

Skyler Dale Page (born October 13, 1989) is an American former animator, writer, storyboard artist, and voice actor. He is best known as the creator of the Cartoon Network animated series Clarence, as well as for his tenure as a writer and storyboard artist on the series Adventure Time.

Page was fired in 2014 after allegations that he had sexually assaulted female co-workers. In 2021, Page admitted that the allegations were true and issued a public apology.

== Early life ==
Page was born in Phoenix, Arizona, on October 13, 1989.

== Career ==
Page is a graduate of California Institute of the Arts. He created two short films entitled Crater Face and Girl Wallet. He then became a writer and storyboard artist and revisionist for Cartoon Network's series Adventure Time and Secret Mountain Fort Awesome. Page is the creator of the show Clarence, where he also voiced the eponymous character. The idea for the series was conceived by Page, along with creative director Nelson Boles, while they were still students at CalArts. The concept was put into further consideration upon Page landing a job at the studio. The series' pilot episode earned Page a nomination for a Creative Arts Emmy Award at the 65th Primetime Creative Arts Emmy Awards ceremony, hosted on September 15, 2013.

In June 2014, Lyle Partridge, (Note: At the time of the allegations and subsequent firing of Page, Partridge used the name Emily and she/her pronouns.) a storyboard artist on Adventure Time that had worked with Page, made a series of tweets alleging that he had sexually assaulted them. This was after rumors had surfaced on Twitter claiming that Page was "known to grope women without their consent". Page was fired from Clarence in July, and days after his firing, Jeff Rowe stated in a Tumblr post that Page had bipolar I and claimed he had been suffering a manic episode. Emily Quinn, production coordinator on Adventure Time, corroborated the claims about Page's illness, but said that it was not an excuse for his behavior. Spencer Rothbell, one of the writers on Clarence, began to voice Page's character for the remainder of the series.

On June 21, 2021, Page spoke publicly for the first time on the allegations and issued an apology. He stated in a blog post he "was on a power trip from 2012 to 2015" and admitted that he had been "inappropriate towards women". Page ended the post by saying, "Should I be fortunate enough to work alongside you good folks once again you can be sure to expect the utmost respect and dignity out of me."

== Filmography ==
Year	Title	Role	Notes
2010	Crater Face		Writer, director, animator
2011	Girl Wallet		Writer, director, animator
2011	Secret Mountain Fort Awesome		Storyboard revisionist
2011–2013	Adventure Time		Writer, storyboard artist
2014–2015	Clarence	Clarence Wendle, Nathan, Mr. Jim Reese, Amy Shutzger, Larry, additional voices	Creator, executive producer (2014–2015), showrunner (2014–2015), writer (2014–2015), storyboard artist (2014)
2015–2016	TripTank		Animation director, animator
