= Clarence (American TV series) =

American animated television series

- Genre: Surreal comedy Slice of life
- Created by: Skyler Page
- Showrunners: Skyler Page (2014–15); Nelson Boles (2015–16); Stephen P. Neary (2016–18)
- Creative directors: Nelson Boles (2014); David Ochs (2015)
- Voices of: Skyler Page; Spencer Rothbell; Sean Giambrone; Tom Kenny; Roger Craig Smith; Katie Crown; Eric Edelstein
- Theme music composer: Simon Panrucker
- Opening theme: "King of the World"
- Ending theme: "Good Habits (and Bad)", performed by Saba Lou
- Composers: James L. Venable; Simon Panrucker
- Country of origin: United States
- Original language: English
- No. of seasons: 3
- No. of episodes: 130 (list of episodes)

Production
- Executive producers: Skyler Page (episodes 1–26); Curtis Lelash; Jennifer Pelphrey; Brian A. Miller; Rob Sorcher
- Producer: Keith Mack
- Editor: Paul Douglas
- Running time: 11 minutes
- Production company: Cartoon Network Studios

Original release
- Network: Cartoon Network
- Release: April 14, 2014 – June 24, 2018

Clarence is an American animated television series created by Skyler Page for Cartoon Network. The series revolves around the titular character and his two best friends, Jeff and Sumo. Page, a former storyboard artist for Adventure Time and revisionist for Secret Mountain Fort Awesome, developed the series at Cartoon Network Studios as part of their shorts development program in 2012.

The pilot aired after the 2014 Hall of Game Awards show on February 17, 2014. Clarence officially premiered on April 14, 2014, and was seen by approximately 2.3 million viewers, outperforming shows in its same demographic in the time slot. The series' pilot was nominated for a Creative Arts Emmy Award. It completed its four-year run on June 24, 2018, after three seasons and 130 episodes.

== Premise ==
The series focuses on the daily life of Clarence Wendle, a fun-loving and spirited boy, and his best friends: Jeff, who is the more intellectual type, and Sumo, who often uses drastic measures when solving problems.

Clarence lives with his divorced mother Mary and her boyfriend Chad in the fictional town of Aberdale, Arizona. Each episode focuses on the daily-life situations and problems that Clarence and his friends encounter, and their everyday adventures and life experiences as kids.

Other characters include students and faculty at Aberdale Elementary, Clarence's school. Certain episodes focus on the life of supporting characters, like the citizens of Aberdale and Clarence's classmates.

== Characters ==
=== Main ===
The main characters, from left to right: Sumo, Jeff, and Clarence from the Season 1 episode; "Fun Dungeon Face Off"

- Clarence Wendle (voiced by Skyler Page in the pilot and early-mid season 1 and Spencer Rothbell in mid season 1-onwards) is the main protagonist of the series. He is an extroverted, optimistic, and wide-eyed boy who wants to bring out the best in everything and everyone. In the pilot episode, he was the "new kid" in Aberdale and could not wait to make friends. He often follows his heart, reacting towards life with unfailing excitement and enthusiasm. A "nice guy" at heart, Clarence aspires to help people, especially his fellow kids, have fun and live freely, often by using unorthodox methods to do so. He can, however, occasionally let his imagination get the better of him, and has a bad habit of meddling into people's personal lives, unintentionally making their troubles worse. Clarence has a wide range of interests and hobbies, and despite sometimes coming off as a goofball, he more often than not displays an underlying intelligence. Nick Pitera provides Clarence's singing voice in "Jeff Wins".
- Jeffrey "Jeff" Randell (voiced by Sean Giambrone) is Clarence's best friend who is the most intelligent, levelheaded, and morally inclined of the trio and tries his best to prevent Clarence from going down a bad road. Jeff's most well-known trait is that he has a cube-shaped head which represents his "square" personality. He is an avid fan of game shows and enjoys playing along with them.
- Ryan "Sumo" Sumouski (voiced by Tom Kenny) is Clarence's best friend, who is fearless, unpredictable, and often takes drastic and crude measures when trying to solve problems. Despite this often being a drawback, Sumo is loyal to Jeff and Clarence and available when they need support. He and Jeff tend to quarrel with each other due to their opposing personalities, but Clarence acts as the glue that holds the boys' friendships together. In the third season, Sumo was transferred to the new school called West Aberdale. Jason Marsden voiced Sumo in the pilot.
- Mary Wendle (voiced by Katie Crown) is Clarence's 38-year-old mother who is always there to support her son no matter the difficulty. She lives with her boyfriend Chad and her son Clarence. It is revealed In "Hurricane Dilliss" she has an overbearing mother which makes her very annoyed by her taking over her life, and that she has been seeing a therapist for 15 years.
- Charles "Chad" Caswell (voiced by Eric Edelstein) is Mary's 37-year-old boyfriend who works at various odd-jobs and acts as Clarence's father figure (although Clarence mostly calls him Chad). Also has a fondness for guitar playing and rock music that is shown in the pilot.

=== Aberdale Elementary students ===
- Alison (voiced by Grace Kaufman) is a girl who is friends with Clarence, Chelsea and Clarence's friends. She is usually perky, and in the episode "Clarence's Millions" she has a high pitched cheerful voice. Alison is a thin girl with fair skin and a small pointy nose. She keeps her long maroon hair up in a high ponytail using a black hairband. Alison wears a short sleeved orange dress with a white collar, yellow leggings, and purple boots.
- Amy Shutzger (voiced by Skyler Page, later voiced by Damien Haas) is a big girl who, along with Mavis, is the only recurring female character to be voiced by a man. She wears her hair in a ponytail and is taller than most of her classmates. She used to have a crush on Jeff.
- Ashley (voiced by Anastasia James) is a girl who was once the girlfriend of Clarence. They have since ended their relationship, though they remain friends. She likes looking for frogs and attending art class. she has ponytail hair, a pink shirt, and blue overalls.
- Belson Noles (voiced by Roger Craig Smith) is a 10-year-old bully who is more likely to use insults, quips, and pranks rather than physical violence. Selfish, inconsiderate, spoiled, obese, lazy, a show-off, disrespectful to his teachers and mother and very superficial, Belson is very unpopular among his peers because of this, yet Clarence is the only one that sees the good in him, though the same can't be said for him. He is also named after Nelson Boles, who helped create the series. He likely takes after his father, who appears in "Company Man" because they both show a desire for complete control over others. The same voice actor who played Sumo in the pilot, Jason Marsden, voiced Belson as well.
- Bertie is a small child who first appears in the episode "Fun Dungeon Face Off". He constantly keeps bumping into Jeff while going through tunnels and slides.
- Blaide (voiced by Skyler Page, later voiced by Spencer Rothbell) is a 10-year-old boy who is friends with Breehn, Guyler and Clarence. Blaide seems to be a foreigner by the way he talks, shown in "Dollar Hunt", where he told Clarence that he needs a city bus home. Blaide has fair skin, short black hair, and a bean shaped head. He wears a black and yellow striped T shirt, blue shorts, and brown cowboy shoes, he has long arms, with his hands curved outwards.
- Brady Brown (voiced by Daniel DiMaggio) is a shy, quiet, self-isolating 10-year-old boy who has a crush on Mavis. He is also handy and intelligent. He is a parody of Charlie Brown.
- Breehn (voiced by Joshua Rush) is a overachiever who is more of Jeff's friend than Clarence's, and keeps himself well grounded at all times. However, in later episodes he warms up to Clarence and joins him on some of his misadventures. He becomes a better friend of Clarence, and lets loose when with him.
- Camden Golightly (voiced by Spencer Rothbell) is a boy who has deflating cheeks. He has a dad named Hershey who has deflating cheeks as well. He enjoys camping.
- Chelsea Keezheekoni (voiced by Grace Kaufman) is a plucky and outspoken girl who insists that she is superior to any boy, mainly Sumo. She also likes creepy things like werewolves and dead bodies.
- Chet is a 9-year-old boy who is friends with Gary and Hector, he has quiffed hair, a yellow shirt with stripes, and brown hair with white shoes.
- Claudie (voiced by Katie Crown) is a tall girl who's friends with Amy and Ashley.
- Coco (voiced by Megan Uesugi) is a girl who has a crush on Brady. Coco is a stout girl with light brown skin, thick round glasses, big black dot glasses, big black dot eyes with notable eyelashes, large purple lips resembling a duck bill, and short maroon hair. Coco wears an orange bow on her hair, a short sleeved yellow dress with a pink heart on it, light yellow socks, and black Mary Jane shoes. In the episode "Forgotten" she has a pink backpack.
- Courtlin (voiced by Tayler Buck) is a 9-year-old girl, another of Kimby's friends. She has a confident personality and is not afraid to speak her mind. In "Honk", she told Clarence that the horn is super unbecoming of him. She also seems to care about her education and future. She has brown hair with pigtails on it, wears an orange tank top, purple shorts, and magenta shoes.
- Crendle (voiced by Gavin Pierce) is a 9-year-old boy who attends Aberdale school. Crendle is quiet, and it is shown that he fiddles with a stick in "Zoo". It was shown he loves his mom in "Dollar Hunt"
- Darlie (voiced by Isabella Niems) is a girl who wears a hooded sweatshirt. Darlie is friends with Clarence, Kimby, Malessica, Courtlin, Heida and Kennan, the latter with whom she is best friends with. Darlie is one of Clarence's classmates. Darlie wears a red hoodie in the Pilot, but for the remainder of the series she wears a long blue hoodie with the hood always up and a zipper in the front, as well as dark blue boots, Darlie's hair is dark brown and parted in the middle. When she unhooded herself in "Classroom", she is shown to have two pigtails held up by 2 dark indigo scrunchies.
- Debbie Reynolds (voiced by Grace Kaufman) is a 9-year-old girl who wears a bright pink shirt, yellow hair, a green skirt, and reddish shoes.
- Dunkin Bambi (voiced by Carlos Alazraqui) is a small boy. He wears a long-sleeve sweater with vertical light and dark green stripes, long brown shorts, white socks, and grey shoes.
- Dustin Conway (voiced by Kyle Arem) is a karate aficionado who is one of Clarence's classmates and Belson's friends. He later becomes friends with Clarence.
- Emilio (voiced by Albert Gonzales and Enrique Contreras) is a short 10-year-old boy who is friends with Clarence, Julien and Memo, along with his other friends too. He is shown to be a little scared in the episode "Belson's Sleepover". He is a small kid with light brown skin, dark brown hair, thick dark eyebrows, and a large round nose. He also wears a bright blue shirt, dark blue pants, and light blue shoes.
- Fiari (voiced by Tayler Buck) is a dark-skinned boy. He has an upturned nose, and black hair styled in cornrows. He bears somewhat of a resemblance to Dustin. He wears a red, long-sleeved shirt, yellow pants, and light-yellow shoes.
- Gabbie (voiced by Anastasia James) is an energetic girl. Very little else is known about Gabbie, other than that she enjoys playing along with other kids and having fun, along with being oblivious most of the time. In "Clarence's Millions", she is seen fighting Gary and Guyler over the Clarence dollars. Gabbie has pale skin, a pointed chin, and chin-length brown hair. She wears a pink headband in her hair, a pink T shirt underneath a light blue dress, and brown cowboy shoes.
- Gary (voiced by Bryson Barreto) is a 9-year-old boy who rarely talks, so little is known about him. Gary has pale skin with an upturned nose, and his hair is short, dark and worn in a quiff. He wears rectangular glasses with black frames on it, a teal shirt with short blue grey sleeves (as well as a blue grey collar and chest pocket), grey pants, and brown shoes.
- Regis Gilben, or simply known as Gilben, is a 12-year-old silent and motionless boy who communicates with an eerie wind sound. Everyone can seemingly understand this. Somehow, he is ghost-like and can touch without moving.
- Guyler (voiced by Skyler Page, later voiced by Spencer Rothbell) is a 9-year-old blond-haired boy with a long neck and a big nose. Although generally silent, he does make occasional grunts. He is friends with Clarence, and joins him on his escapades. At first a minor character, he becomes more prominent in later episodes; specifically in "A Nightmare on Aberdale Street: Balance's Revenge". It is shown that he is Dutch.
- Hector (voiced by Sean Giambrone) is a 9-year-old boy who is friends with Clarence and Chet, Hector has a great skill of intelligence as he calculates how many more Clarence Dollars they need to make by the end of the school day. He first met Clarence when being bullied; Clarence gave Hector's bully a Clarence dollar. Hector is a short stout kid with fair skin as well as big eyes and ears. He has short, dark blond hair with shaved sides and a cowlick. He wears a large pair of glasses with round lenses and black frames; a yellow short sleeved shirt; high waisted orange pants; pink socks and red shoes.
- Heida (voiced by Natasha Leggero and Roger Craig Smith and Ivy Bishop) is a 10-year-old girl who is friends with Darlie. She has fair skin, a squarish-shaped head, chubby cheeks, and freckles. Her hair is long, dirty blonde, and worn like a ponytail; she also has bangs with a center part. She wears a turquoise short sleeved shirt under what appears to be a white sleeveless dress, she also wears pink boots.
- John-George (voiced by Kyle Arem) is a 9-year-old boy who wears a yellow t-shirt, blue shorts, and light-blue shoes.
- Julien (voiced by Joshua Black) is a brown-skinned boy who likes being friends with Clarence, Emilio and Memo. He has brown skin, a round nose, and shaved head. He wears a green t-shirt, blue pants and navy blue shoes.
- Kennan (voiced by Spencer Rothbell) is a 10-year-old boy who is quiet and shy, and sometimes he can be clumsy. He is a friend of Clarence, Darlie and John-George, and he is Darlie's closest friend. Kennan has fair skin, thin limbs, and a large upper round body like a circle, he also has blond bangs with the rest of his hair covered by his hood. And also, he wears a blue zip up sweatshirt with the hood up, as well as dark blue jeans and shoes.
- Kimby (voiced by Isabella Niems) is another of Clarence's classmates. Kimby is shown as an introverted, awkward, insecure, yet lovely 9-year-old girl who strokes her hair when she gets nervous (as revealed in "Plant Daddies"). As a girly girl, Kimby often collects dolls and stuffed animals, and enjoys giving and receiving makeovers. It is shown that she was friends with Clarence alongside Malessica and Courtlin in episode "Slumber Party". She has brownish hair, wears a blue full skirt with a white collar in the center, white socks, and black Mary Jane shoes.
- Lizzy (voiced by Katie Crown) is a short girl who's friends with Amy and Ashley.
- Malakevin (voiced by Thomas Barbusca) is a stout boy who has a dark and sinister personality and causes trouble wherever he goes.
- Malessica (voiced by Ivy Bishop) is a 9-year-old girl who is one of Kimby's friends. She used to be in love with Jeff. She plays the electric guitar, as revealed in "Turtle Hats".
- Marlie (voiced by Stephanie Sara) is a 10-year-old girl who does not speak much. She wears a dark purple ribbon in her hair, a pale pink blouse with a large white collar, a purple skirt, white socks, and pink pumps. In episodes like "Clarence's Millions" and "Average Jeff," she can be seen wearing a lavender-colored t-shirt with a pink bear on it, purple pants, and orange-and-blue shoes.
- Mavis (voiced by Spencer Rothbell) is a squat, noseless, 9 year old red-haired girl who speaks in unintelligible grunts and has a fear of fire hydrants.
- Memo (voiced by Skyler Page) is a 9-year-old boy who enjoys going on adventures with Clarence, Emilio and Julien. He is a quiet boy who doesn't speak. Memo is a tall and somewhat pudgy boy with light brown skin, and a broad nose. His hair is dark brown and shoulder length with straight across bangs that covers his forehead.
- Nathan (voiced by Skyler Page, later voiced by Damien Haas) is one of Belson's friends. He is a big boy who is considered dimwitted. He becomes friends with Clarence as well, often participating in his escapades.
- Patsie (voiced by Hagia Hayes) is a 9-year-old girl who is friends with Clarence and Alison. She looks younger than the other Aberdale Elementary students and acts just as immature as Percy. Patsie is studious, as she was carrying so many books to take home in the episode "Clarence Gets a Girlfriend". Patsie is a small child with fair skin, short curly yellow hair, blue eyes, and long eyelashes. She wears an orange tank top with a purple cat on it, green shorts, and dark violet shoes.
- Percival "Percy" Dahmer (voiced by Roger Craig Smith) is a 10-year-old short, wimpy, boy who speaks in a weak voice and is friends with Clarence and Belson. He lacks fingers. Like Clarence, he tends to let his imagination get the better of him. He is the most immature kid out of all his classmates and friends.
- Reed Wright (voiced by Bryson Barretto) is a boy who was scared by Clarence once. Other than this, he is usually seen as a background character. Reed has deep brown skin, oval glasses, large lips resembling a duck bill, curly black hair, and a large black mole on the side of his face. He wears a green t-shirt, blue jeans, and dark blue shoes; in the episode "Forgotten" he has a pink backpack.
- Rita Hall (voiced by Maddy McGraw) is a cheerful and chatty skateboarding 9-year-old who is friends with Chelsea.
- Samuel (voiced by Damien Haas) is a 10-year-old boy who is a student in Ms Baker's class in Aberdale Elementary. Samuel is very nice, although, he seems to get reminded to behave sometimes.
- Timmy (voiced by Stuart Allan) is a 9-year-old hyperactive energetic boy who attends Aberdale Elementary. He is seen showing everyone a tappy card in the ending of "Clarence's Millions". Buddy has blonde curly yellow hair, round eyes. His torso is similar to Sumo and Breehn's. He wears a light bluish-green shirt, some dark blue shorts, and red shoes.
- Tinia Pearson (voiced by Mckenna Grace) is a 6-year-old girl whom Clarence meets at the hospital. She presents as sweet and naïve, but has a greedy and selfish soul.
- Tony (voiced by Michael Leone) is a 9-year-old boy with a love for arcade games. He is thin with pale skin, large brown eyebrows, long legs, and a round head. His hair is brown and parted in the middle, and he has shaved sides. He wears a yellow t-shirt, pinkish orange shorts, and grey-purple shoes.
- Tracy (voiced by Grace Kaufman) is a 9-year-old girl who wears a green striped shirt, brown hair and brown shoes.
- Try (voiced by Tom Kenny) is a big and tall 10 year old boy who is a student in Ms Baker's class in Aberdale Elementary. He is calm and kind to others. Try has brown hair, and freckles under his eyes, and he is the first Clarence character to never have a nose. Try wears a yellow shirt, light green shorts, and dark blue boots.
- Vu (voiced by Bryson Barretto) is a 9 year old black-haired, skinny boy who speaks in a loud, exclaiming voice. He has a brother, as revealed in "Chadsgiving".
- William is a short boy who's friends with Clarence.

=== Aberdale Elementary staff ===
- Ms. Melanie Baker (voiced by Katie Crown) is the 4th-grade teacher at Aberdale Elementary who is shown to be helpful and caring, yet easily overwhelmed.
- Mr. Jim Reese (voiced by Skyler Page, later voiced by Donovan Patton) is the gruff yet dimwitted, vice-principal of the school. He is a former police officer with a voracious appetite.
- Ms. Brenda Shoop (voiced by Katie Crown) is the inattentive, irresponsible, possible guidance counselor who cares little about the students. This is seen in "Freedom Cactus", where she thought Clarence's harmless comic was offensive, but when no parents said it was, she pretended to be an offended parent to cancel it. She has been working at the school for 30 years, as revealed in "The Substitute", but in " Lost Playground" her mother stated that she wasn't allowed to play on the playground 49 years prior.
- Ms. Meg Julep (voiced by Kate Berlant) is a substitute teacher who is extremely nervous and gullible and is unable to assert herself.

=== Sumouski family ===
- Mel Sumouski (voiced by John DiMaggio) is Sumo's strict 45 year old father, a hillbilly who is extremely rough around the edges and has a tough personality, but is very understanding with his kids.
- Tinona Sumouski (voiced by Christine Lakin) is Sumo's extremely protective Southern-accented mother, with a tough and kind personality.
- Brandi Sumouski (voiced by Christine Lakin) is Sumo's cherish, good, confident 8-year-old sister who gave Clarence a wrench to fight for self-defense, she loves looking through the aquarium and being a mermaid, she has a hillbilly like accent. Although Sumo and Brandi do not get along, Brandi also loves watching wrestling and is quiet. She wears a pink skirt, a pink shirt, and a pink bow on her head.
- Tanner Sumouski (voiced by Ari Rubin) is Sumo's muscular, dimwitted, older brother who frequently bullies Sumo.

=== Noles family ===
- Cynthia Noles (voiced by Mena Suvari) is Belson's kind mother who does not stand up to anyone and usually does not notice her son's mean behavior. This is until she sees how he acts to Clarence in the episode "Dust Buddies" and punishes him by not only making him do the chores he called their maid to do because of his laziness, but also ruining his game save files and avatars. She resembles him down to their noses. Jeff is implied to have a crush on her.
- Mr. Noles (voiced by Rick Zieff) is Belson's greedy, workaholic father who never spends any time with his son, to the point that he does not recognize the boy. He has a very aggressive and violent personality.

=== Randell family ===
- EJ (voiced by Lea DeLaria) and Sue Randell (voiced by Tig Notaro) are Jeff's mothers who are free-spirited and always patient with their son.
- Rosie Randell (voiced by June Squibb) is EJ's mother and Jeff's grandmother. She is extremely overbearing.

=== Extended Wendle family ===
- Dilliss Wendle (voiced by Maria Bamford) is Mary's fast-talking, scatterbrained, extremely selfish, overbearing, 68-year-old mother who has dementia and insists that she do everything for everyone. In "Plane Excited", she is revealed to have died, although it is never specified how.
- Seymour Wendle (voiced by Jeff Bennett) is Mary's 68-year-old father. He calls Clarence "Creedence", implying that he may be suffering from dementia just like his wife.
- Fern (voiced by Eric Edelstein) and Star Caswell (voiced by Cree Summer) are Chad's calm, laid-back hippie parents who live in a dome-shaped house and have pet emus.

=== Extended Shoop family ===
- Millie Shoop (voiced by Katie Crown) is Ms. Shoop's extremely protective mother who would never let her play outside as a child. She very much resembles an elderly version of her daughter.

=== West Aberdale Elementary staff ===
- Mr. Craig Mozer (voiced by Carlos Alazraqui) is Sumo's relaxed teacher at West Aberdale Elementary who is involved with Ms. Baker.
- Ms. Lofton (voiced by Jenelle Lynn Randall) is the principal of West Aberdale Elementary.

=== Breehn's family ===
- Walt (voiced by Dave Wittenberg) and Tiffany (voiced by Abigail Revanch) are Breehn's parents who are emotionally abusive towards their son and believe themselves to be superior to everyone around them because of their vintage house. They constantly brag about their home. They try to control everything their son does, all to make him "perfect" in their eyes.

=== Others ===
- Joshua "Josh" Maverick (voiced by Brent Popolizio) is a 27-year-old grumpy man who does not like children, especially Sumo, and later Clarence. He is shown to be very accident prone and constantly gets severe injuries during every one of his appearances, usually accidentally caused by Clarence's hijinks. In later episodes of the first season he went from a lanky young man to overweight, with no known reason.
- Amy Gillis (voiced by Ava Acres) is a nice and kind 10-year-old girl who is a good friend to Clarence. However, she never appears after her debut in the second episode, "Pretty Great Day With a Girl", due to her moving away, save for a cameo in "Rough Riders Elementary" and a flashback in "Clarence For President".
- Sandy (voiced by Katie Crown) is a stuffy, unsatisfiable, rude, irritable, morbidly obese woman who rides around on a scooter and speaks with an upper-class English accent. She is a frequent customer at Mary's hair parlor, where she often runs over employees and always demands that the most expensive shampoo be used for her.
- Larry (voiced by Skyler Page, later voiced by Spencer Rothbell) is an odd 70-year-old man who goes on a date with Ms. Baker in "Neighborhood Grill". He is known for not being fazed by anything, as well as writing down every detail about the people he meets.
- Cooter (voiced by Gunnar Sizemore) and Seabass (voiced by Atticus Shaffer) are a pair of bullies who are rivals of Sumo's.
- Lauren (voiced by Rachel Eggleston) is an extremely smart girl who has been homeschooled since she was 6 years old and does not know much about the outside world.
- Lauren's Dad (voiced by Jeff Witzke) is Lauren's dignified yet gentle and open-minded hippie father who encourages Lauren to talk about her feelings.
- Jeremy (voiced by Henry Kaufman) is Clarence's zany doppelgänger who appears in his dreams, which he tries to trap Clarence in.
- Balance (voiced by Spencer Rothbell) is a violent, short-tempered circus performer with dwarfism who loves to terrorize children and has a hook for a right hand. He is very acrobatic and possesses mind control powers.
- The Mayor of Aberdale (voiced by Dave Boat) is the selfish, idiotic, and corrupt mayor.
- Papa Marianio (voiced by John DiMaggio) is the town's pizza chef who is beloved by all. He may be insane, seeing as he dresses up as Jeff to badmouth himself as a prank.
- Nature Kate (voiced by Natasha Leggero) is a courageous, deferential, and fearless woman who is exceedingly heroic towards the children of Aberdale, invariably there to protect and shelter them from danger.
- Guyler's Mom (voiced by Skyler Page) is Guyler's kind 40-year-old mother. She looks very similar to her son and husband. She wears a light blue turtle-neck sweater and has long light brown hair.

== Production ==
At their 2013 upfront, Clarence was announced along with various other series. The series was created by Page, a former storyboard artist for Adventure Time and revisionist for Secret Mountain Fort Awesome. He is the fourth creator on the network who graduated from the California Institute of the Arts, and at age 24, he is also the youngest. As part of their shorts development program in 2012, the series was developed at Cartoon Network Studios; four others, Steven Universe, Over the Garden Wall, We Bare Bears and Long Live the Royals also came from this initiative.

Page, together with creative director Nelson Boles, conceived the series at CalArts. It was further considered when Page became hired at Cartoon Network Studios. A crew of two or three polished the pilot episode; after it had been picked up, a crew of 30 to 35 writers, storyboard artists, revisionists, colorists and designers were employed. Meanwhile, animation is outsourced to South Korea through the Saerom Animation. Page explained that the hardest part of production was keeping pace, especially where once an episode is completed, one must start over. He called this "exciting", but "very challenging".

According to writer Spencer Rothbell, the series was created with a naturalistic tone, similar to cartoons of the 1990s, combined with a more modern feeling. Given this naturalism, writers can reference works that have inspired for them or fit the genre of an episode. He ultimately felt that it was about "empowering kids and having fun". Rothbell also avoids "pigeonholing" into one type of story, and that while some plots are mostly character-driven, others are "based on one idea that we think is really funny". Inspiration also came from the shows Page watched as a child, which invoked more poignant and relatable situations. Despite this, elements of fantasy are allowed, and that conveying both incongruous to one another was one technique he particularly enjoyed. Boles noted that the art direction called for inconsistent character design to avoid having to fit model sheet with the universe perfectly—a result of what he dubs The Simpsons effect. Attention is also paid to background characters in order to expand variety in its plot and universe.

=== Crossovers ===
In the end of the Steven Universe/Uncle Grandpa episode, "Say Uncle", UG looks over the list of characters from former and current Cartoon Network shows and saw Clarence is the last on his list.

Clarence, Jeff, Sumo, and Belson appeared in "The Grampies", the short accompanying the Uncle Grandpa episode "Pizza Eve", along with other Cartoon Network characters from currently running and ended cartoons. Belson had a speaking role in that short.

In The Amazing World of Gumball episode "The Boredom", Clarence and Mary make an appearance, alongside Uncle Grandpa and Regular Show characters.

In the OK K.O.! Let's Be Heroes episode "Crossover Nexus", Jeff made an appearance, along with other Cartoon Network characters.

=== Sexual assault allegations against Page and firing from Cartoon Network ===
In July 2014, Skyler Page was fired from Cartoon Network Studios amid allegations that he had sexually assaulted a female coworker, Emily Partridge, (now Lyle Partridge), a former storyboard revisionist on Adventure Time. A Cartoon Network spokesperson confirmed that the series would continue despite his absence. Spencer Rothbell later became head of story and the voice of Clarence. Nelson Boles, who was previously the series creative director, served as series showrunner for the remainder of the first season. Stephen P. Neary, one of the storyboard artists for the series, took over as showrunner for the second season and onward after Boles left the series early in the second season.

In June 2021, Page admitted that the allegations were true and issued a public apology.

=== LGBT representation ===
In September 2014, Spencer Rothbell, a writer, head of storywriting, and voice actor of multiple characters for Clarence, said that they had to change a scene in the episode "Neighborhood Grill", which showed two gay characters after pushback from Cartoon Network executives. According to Rothbell, the original scene showed the two characters kissing on the lips, noting that "originally the guy had flowers and they kissed on the mouth." Later he lamented that the scene in the episode is "better than nothing", adding that "maybe one day the main character can be gay and it won't be a big deal." Despite this step back, there were some moves forward.

On December 4, 2014, EJ and Sue Randell were introduced as Jeff's mothers in the episode "Jeff Wins".

== Cancellation ==
On April 4, 2017, Spencer Rothbell confirmed on his Twitter page that the series' third season would be its last as Cartoon Network did not renew the series for a fourth season, which ended on June 24, 2018.

== Episodes ==
Season	Episodes	Originally released	
Season	Episodes	First released	Last released
Pilot		May 21, 2013 (online); February 17, 2014 (TV)	
1	51	April 14, 2014	October 27, 2015
2	39	January 18, 2016	February 3, 2017
3	40	February 10, 2017	June 24, 2018
Shorts	14	July 6, 2015	June 24, 2018

== Broadcast and reception ==
Clarence was originally previewed at the 2013 San Diego Comic-Con. Cartoon Network had commissioned twelve quarter-hour episodes, with the pilot episode airing after the Hall of Game Awards show on February 17, 2014. The pilot was nominated for an "Outstanding Short-format Animated Program" at the 65th Primetime Creative Arts Emmy Awards in 2013. (Note: Page, Peter Browngardt, Robert Alvarez, Brian A. Miller, Jennifer Pelphrey, Curtis Lelash and Rob Sorcher were the recipients.) The first episode, aired on April 14, 2014, was met with an estimated 2.3 million viewers, outperforming shows in its same demographic in the time slot by double and triple-digit percentages. Meanwhile, preliminary data identified it as the most watched series premiere for the network that year. From September 7 to 30, 2020, reruns of the series aired on Boomerang.

In Canada, Clarence premiered on Cartoon Network on April 14 and on Teletoon on September 4, but it was later moved exclusively to Cartoon Network. The series premiered on October 6 on Cartoon Network in Australia and New Zealand and on November 3 on Cartoon Network in the United Kingdom and Ireland. In India, the series debuted on June 1, 2015 on Cartoon Network. The last 13 episodes of the series aired first in Germany before airing in the United States.

Critical response for Clarence was mixed, with Emily Ashby of Common Sense Media, in a three-star review, alerted parents of "a similar brand of absurdity and crudeness" as Adventure Time—though less severe—but praised the cast as "oddly likable". Nancy Basile of About.com applauded the dialogue for its lengthiness, and considered the relationships between the characters to be dynamic and genuine, with some comedy thrown in. Whitney Matheson of USA Today found Clarence to blend optimism and surreal humor in "just the right amount", and encouraged children and parents alike to watch its premiere. In Animation Magazine, Mercedes Milligan described it as "a breath of fresh suburban air" and a celebration of childhood. Nivea Serrao of TV Guide contrasted the show with most fantasy animated series. Brian Lowry of Variety called it "so quirky and idiosyncratic as to feel fresh", although it sometimes tread in "well-worn territory", but found the character designs unattractive.

The series gained considerable press after featuring a gay couple in the episode "Neighborhood Grill", with coverage in various tabloid and entertainment news sites, (Note: E! Online, El Universal, the Huffington Post (both in their UK and US editions), MTV News and Refinery29.) and in LGBT-oriented sites as well. (Note: Coverage in these sites include Pink News, Gay Star News and Queerty.) The scene involves two male characters greeting each other with kisses on the cheek while at a restaurant. Rothbell originally had the couple kiss on the lips after receiving flowers from the other, but this went unapproved by the network. He added that the scene was a "minor throwaway moment", albeit "better than nothing", and anticipated that "one day the main character can be gay and it won't be a big deal". Joe Morgan of Gay Star News called the buildup to the scene "an old joke", a notion shared by Dan Tracer of Queerty, although he praised their portrayal "just as normal people".

In 2017, the Kenya Film Classification Board banned Clarence, together with the cartoon series The Loud House, The Legend of Korra, Hey Arnold!, Steven Universe and Adventure Time, from being broadcast in Kenya. According to the Board, the reason was that these series were "glorifying homosexual behavior".

=== Awards and nominations ===
Year	Award	Category	Nominee	Result
2013	Primetime Creative Arts Emmy Awards	Outstanding Short-Format Animated Program	"Clarence" (Pilot)	Nominated
2015	British Academy Children's Awards	International	Clarence	Nominated
2016	Annie Awards	Best Animated TV/Broadcast Production for Children's Audience	"Turtle Hats"	Nominated

== Home media ==
Title	Season(s)	Episode count	Running time (minutes)	Release dates (United States)	Episodes
Cartoon Network Holiday Collection	1	1	11	October 7, 2014	3
Mystery Piñata	1	12	132	February 10, 2015	Pilot, 1–2, 4–5, 7, 11–12, 15–16, 18, 21, 23
Dust Buddies	1	12	132	September 15, 2015	3, 6, 8, 10, 14, 17, 19–20, 25–26, 29, 36

The series was made available on HBO Max on May 27, 2020. It was later removed from the streaming service on December 6, 2022 in the US; it was later brought back on the service on December 20. The series was removed from it again on May 8, 2023.
