= Polsat Comedy Central Extra =

- Country: Poland
- Broadcast area: Poland
- Headquarters: Warsaw, Poland

Programming
- Language: Polish
- Picture format: 1080i HDTV (downscaled to 16:9 576i for the SDTV feed)
- Timeshift service: Polsat Comedy Central Extra +1

Ownership
- Owner: Skydance Europe
- Parent: Telewizja Polsat
- Sister channels: Comedy Central

History
- Launched: 14 January 2011; 15 years ago
- Replaced: VH1 Poland
- Former names: Comedy Central Family (2011–2020)

Links
- Website: comedycentral.pl/family

Polsat Comedy Central Extra is a Polish channel focusing on comedy owned by Paramount Networks EMEAA. It was launched on 29 April 2010 as a programming block on VH1 Poland. On 14 January 2011, VH1 Poland was rebranded as Comedy Central Family.

On 24 April 2012, VH1 Poland was relaunched, replacing VH1 Europe in Poland.

On 12 June 2012, Comedy Central Family started broadcasting in 16:9 picture format.

On 3 March 2020 the channel was rebranded Polsat Comedy Central Extra. Comedy Central Family was only available in Hungary until its closedown in July 2024.

Initially scheduled to close on 31 December 2025, it was later reported that the channel will continue broadcasting through to 31 December 2026. The information was revealed by insPort, a local cable company. MWE Networks had planned the launch of a replacement channel, Comedy Channel Extra.

Polsat Comedy Central Extra alongside TeenNick Poland were planned to shut down on 31 December 2026, however, in September 2026, Polsat Comedy Central Extra, alongside TeenNick Poland continues to broadcasting.

== Programming ==
=== Current ===
- 'Allo 'Allo! (Note: Also present on Comedy Central Family)
- Comedy Club
- I kto tu rządzi?
- Keeping Up Appearances
- Ministerstwo śmiechu
- Mr. Bean
- Najzabawniejsze reklamy świata!
- Tatuśkowie
- Twarzą w twarz
- Two and a Half Men

=== Former ===
- 2 Broke Girls
- According to Jim
- And Who's in Charge Here?
- Beautiful and Unemployed
- Blok Ekipa
- The Chairman's Ear
- The Cosby Show
- Daleko od noszy
- Dharma & Greg
- Drunk History
- Everybody Hates Chris
- Everybody Loves Raymond
- Friends
- The Goldbergs
- Graczykowie
- The King of Queens
- Malcolm in the Middle
- The Middle
- Mike & Molly
- Mom
- My Family
- My Wife and Kids
- Niania
- The Lousy World
- Rick and Morty
- Rodzina zastępcza
- Roseanne
- South Park
- What I Like About You (TV series)
- Włatcy móch
