= Przemysław Borkowski =

Polish cabaret performer and writer

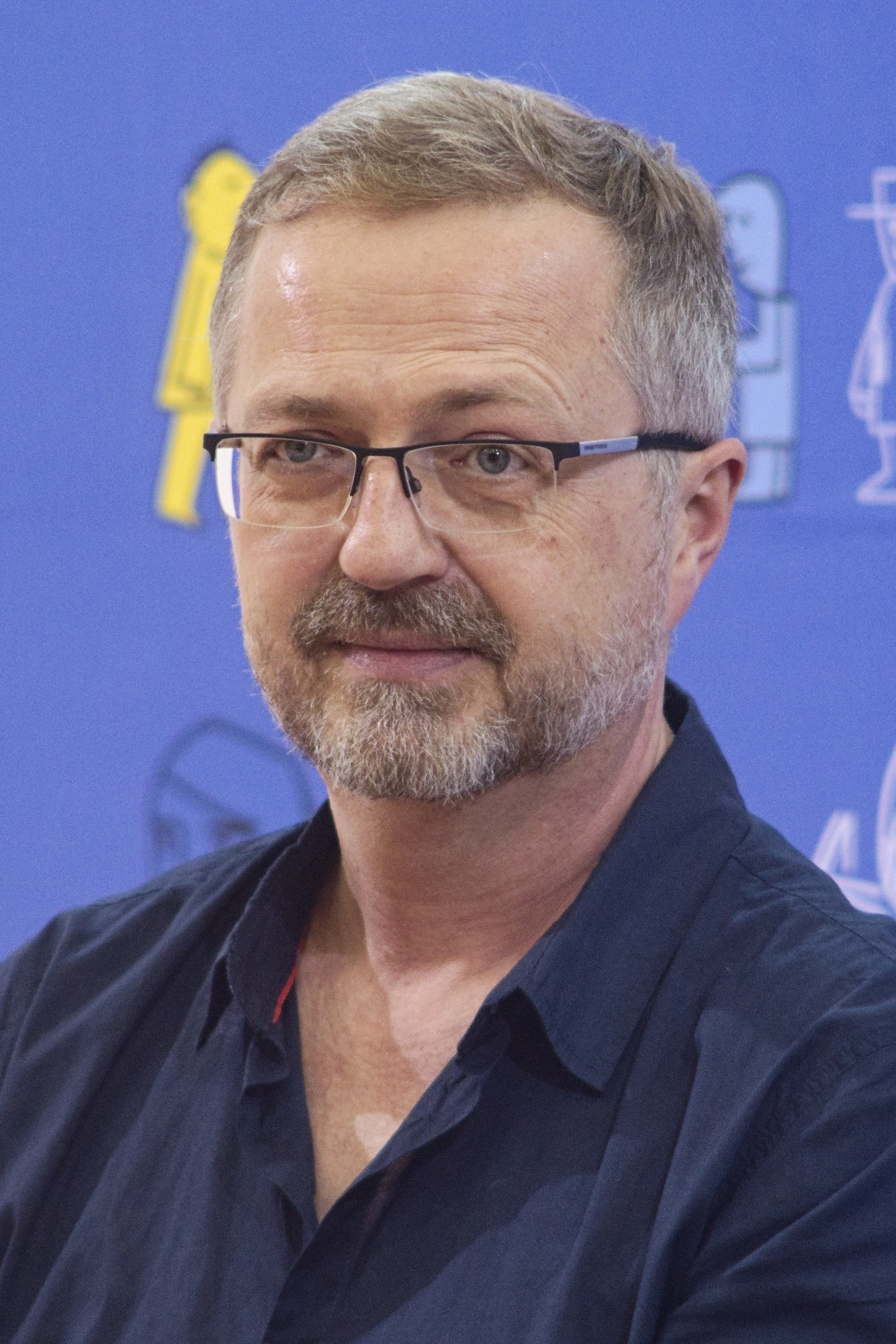
- Przemysław Borkowski in 2023
- Born: 1973 (age 52–53); Olsztyn, Poland
- Education: University of Warsaw
- Occupations: Novelist; columnist; comedian
- Years active: 1994–present
- Writing career
- Genres: crime fiction, thriller

Przemysław Borkowski (born 1973; Polish pronunciation: [pʂɛˈmɘ̟.swaf bɔrˈkɔf.ski]) is a Polish crime fiction and thriller book author, columnist, and comedian. He is a co-founder of the cabaret comedy group of Kabaret Moralnego Niepokoju.

== Biography ==
Przemysław Borkowski was born in 1973, in Olsztyn, Poland, and grew up in nearby village of Dywity. He currently lives in Warsaw.

He graduated in polish studies from the Faculty of Polish Studies of the University of Warsaw. In 1993, while in university, together with his friends, Mikołaj Cieślak, and Robert Górski, they formed a student cabaret group, titled Klub Poszukiwaczy Prawdy i Piękna (Club of the Seekers of Truth and Beauty). In 1995, it was renamed to the Kabaret Moralnego Niepokoju (Cabaret of Moral Anxiety). The group gained huge popularity, eventually becoming one of the most famous cabaret groups in Poland.

In 2000, Borkowski, Cieślak, and Górski, had written and published together a poetry book titled Zeszyt w trzy linie.

Borkowski is a crime fiction and thriller book author. His first novel, titled Gra w pochowanego, was published in 2009. He is also a columnist for web portal Onet.pl, and magazines Kariera, and Metropol. In the past he also wrote for magazines Przekrój and Fronda.

== Bibliography ==
- 2000: Zeszyt w trzy linie (poetry book; co-written with Mikołaj Cieślak and Robert Górski)
- 2001: Miasteczko Dermań (short story; published in Fronda, issue 23/24)
- 2009: Gra w pochowanego (novel; published by Fabryka Słów)
- 2011: Opowieści Central Parku (collection of short stories; published by Pisze Się)
- 2013: Hotel Zaświat (novel; published by Oficynka)
- 2017: Zakładnik (novel; published by Czwarta Strona)
- 2018: Niedobry pasterz (novel; published by Czwarta Strona)
- 2019: Widowisko (novel; published by Czwarta strona)
- 2020: Rytuał łowcy (novel; published by Czwarta Strona)
- 2021: Śmierć nie ucieknie (novel; published by Czwarta Strona)
- 2022: Wieża strachu (novel; published by Czwarta Strona)

== Filmography ==
Year	Title	Role	Notes	Ref.
2007	Ryś	Young and honest person	Feature film	
2012	Hans Kloss: More Than Death at Stake	—N/a	Feature film; coordination of reenactment groups	
2017	The Chairman's Ear	Józef Piłsudski	Television series; episode: "The Whole Nation Rejoices" (no. 14)	
2018	The Chairman's Ear	Actor portraying Józef Piłsudski	Television series; episode: "The Titan" (no. 50)	
2021	Beautiful and Unemployed	Roman	Television series; episode: "Na wsi" (no. 12)	
2023	Emigracja XD	—N/a	Television series; cinematographer's assistant; episode no. 10	
