= VH1 & Comedy Central Family Poland =

This is a list of articles relating to VH1 & Comedy Central Family Poland.

- VH1 (Poland)
- Comedy Central (Poland)
- Comedy Central Family (Poland)
