= Robert Górski =

Polish comedian, satirist, actor and scriptwriter

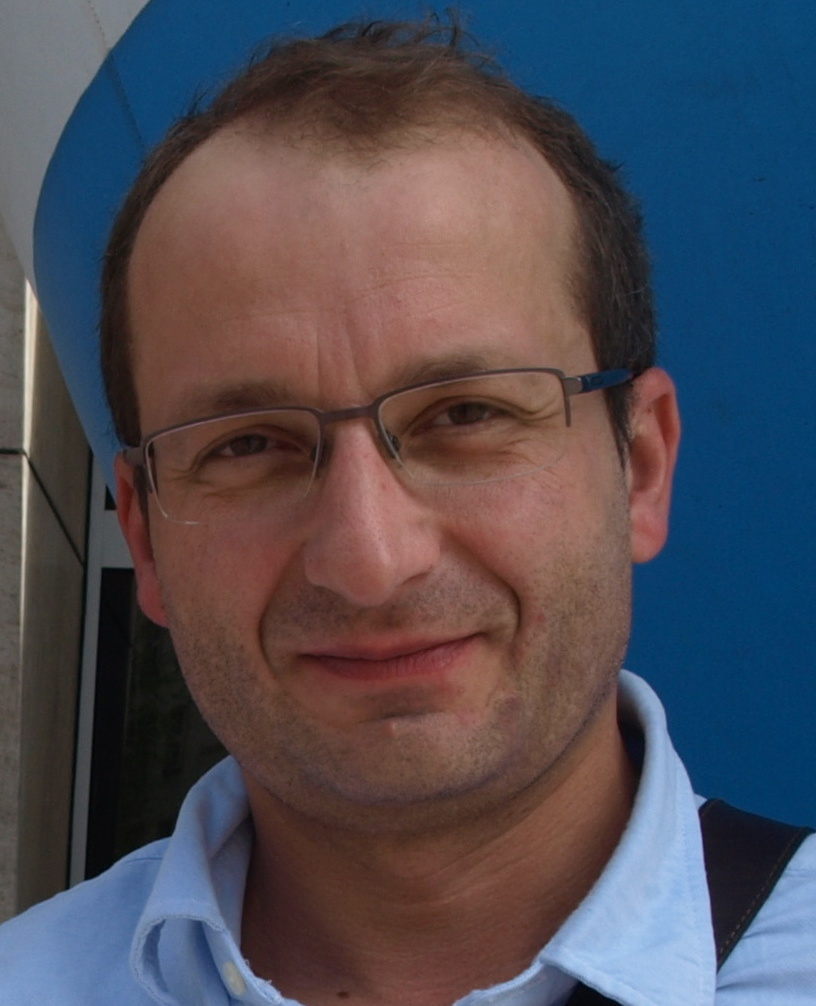
- Górski in 2013
- Born: April 14, 1971 (age 55); Warsaw, Poland
- Education: University of Warsaw
- Occupations: Actor; comedian; scriptwriter
- Years active: 1994–present
- Spouse: Monika Sobień (m. 2019)
- Children: 2

Robert Górski (born 14 April 1971; Polish: [ˈɡur.ski]) is a Polish comedian, satirist, actor, and scriptwriter. He is a co-founder of the Kabaret Moralnego Niepokoju comedy group. Among his notable works is 2017 political satire web series The Chairman's Ear (2017–2019), which he created, and in which, he portrayed the main role of chairman Jarosław. He also created and starred in television series Państwo z kartonu (2020), and Beautiful and Unemployed (2021).

== Biography ==
Robert Górski was born on 14 April 1971 in Warsaw, Poland. He grew up in a working class family, in the city of Warsaw, in the neighbourhood of Bródno. His father worked as a bus driver, and his mother as a tailor. He has one brother. Górski graduated in precision mechanics from a vocational school in the Warsaw neighbourhood of Kamionek. During this time, he played a drum kit. After graduating from the school, he began studying geology, however, he quit it. Later, he began studying polish studies at the Faculty of Polish Studies of the University of Warsaw, from which he graduated. While in university, he worked as a copywriter for Ammirati Puris Lintas Polska advertising agency.

In 1993, while in university, together with his friends, Przemysław Borkowski, and Mikołaj Cieślak, they formed a student cabaret group, titled Klub Poszukiwaczy Prawdy i Piękna (Club of the Seekers of Truth and Beauty). In 1995, it was renamed to the Kabaret Moralnego Niepokoju (Cabaret of Moral Anxiety). The group gained huge popularity, eventually becoming one of the most famous cabaret groups in Poland.

In 2000, Borkowski, Cieślak, and Górski, had written and published together a poetry book titled Zeszyt w trzy linie.

In 2001, he was a co-creator of the satirical puppet show Gumitycy for the TV Puls. From 2003 to 2006, the Kabaret Moralnego Niepokoju comedy group hosted the TVP2 comedy programme Tygodnik Moralnego Niepokoju, which was then followed from 2007 to 2008, by Miesięcznik Moralnego Niepokoju. Górski wrote scripts for both shows. He also co-hosted, together with Andrzej Poniedzielski, hosted TVP2 comedy programme Kabaretowe kawałki. In 2005, he was also a regular commentator Szkło kontaktowe satirical commentatory programme by TVN24. He also wrote scripts for comedy show HBO na stojaka, as well as for the entertainment events such as Masurian Comedy Night and National Festival of Polish Song in Opole.

From 2009 to 2012, together with Marcin Wójcik, he co-hosted TVP2 comedy programme Kabaretowy Klub Dwójki. In 2012 was published an autobiographical book, titled Jak zostałem premierem. Rozmowy pełne Moralnego Niepokoju (translation from Polish: How I Became the Prime Minister. Conversations full of the Moral Anxiety), which was co-written by Górski and journalist Mariusz Cieślik.

In 2013, Górski wrote and directed a comedy theatrical play titled Zdrówko, which premiered on 9 December in the Capitol Theatre in Warsaw. In 2013, 2014, and 2016, he hosted some episodes of the TVP2 comedy programme Dzięki Bogu już weekend. From 2015 to 2016, together with Marcin Wójcik, he co-hosted the TVP2 comedy programme Latający Klub 2. In 2016, he appeared in Polsat comedy show Kabaret na żywo.

From 2017 to 2019, Górski created the political satirical web series The Chairman's Ear, for which he wrote scripts, and portrayed the main role. In 2018, he had adapted the series into a theatrical play, titled Ucho Prezesa, czyli Scheda, in which he portrayed the main role. The play was directed by Tadeusz Śliwa, and premiered on 21 December 2018, in the 6th Floor Theatre in Warsaw. In 2019, he published his second autobiographical book, titled Jak zostałem Prezesem (translation from Polish: How I Became the Chairman), which was co-written with his wife, Monika Sobień-Górska.

In 2020, Górski created the satirical comedy series titled Państwo z kartonu, consisting of 12 episodes. It was created during the COVID-19 pandemic, while Górski remained self-isolated in his house together with his wife, Monika Sobień-Górska, and their child. It was filmed with a smartphone camera, with Robert Górski and Monika Sobień-Górska being the only actors. The show premiered on 26 April 2020, on WP television channel, and on its website, wideo.wp.pl. In 2021, Górski created and co-wrote the comedy-drama series Beautiful and Unemployed, in which he played the main role. The series had one season, which premiered on 6 March 2021, on Polsat television channel.

From 2022 to 2023, he was again one of the commentators of TVN24 satirical commentatory programme Szkło kontaktowe. From 24 November 2022, together with Mariusz Cieślik, he co-hosts a satirical commentary news podcast titled Górski & Cieślik. Polska od ucha do ucha, for the Rzeczpospolita newspaper.

== Personal life ==
He has a son, Antoni (born 2004), from an informal relationship with graphic designer Katarzyna Osipowicz. On 7 September 2019, Robert Górski married a journalist Monika Sobień-Górska, with whom he has a daughter, Malina (born 2019).

== Filmography ==
=== Films ===
Year	Title	Role	Notes	Ref.
2003	Baśń o ludziach stąd	Kolumb		
2009	Złoty środek	Paweł		
2015	Wkręceni 2	Police spokesperson		
2016	7 rzeczy, których nie wiecie o facetach	Tavern manager		
2016	The Advisors of King Hydrops	Fronton	Voice; short film	
2017	Napis	Piotr Bondaruk	Short film	

=== Television series ===
Year	Title	Role	Notes	Ref.
1999	Badziewiakowie	Firefighter	Episode: "Słomiany wdowiec" (no. 6)	
1999	Badziewiakowie	Journalist	Episode: "Głodówka" (no. 12)	
2003–2006	Tygodnik Moralnego Niepokoju	Himself	Co-host	
2003–2006	Tygodnik Moralnego Niepokoju	Various roles		
2005, 2022–2023	Szkło kontaktowe	Himself		
2007–2008	Miesięcznik Moralnego Niepokoju	Himself	Co-host	
2007–2008	Miesięcznik Moralnego Niepokoju	Various roles		
2008–2016	Spadkobiercy	George Owens	Main role	
2009–2012	Kabaretowy Klub Dwójki	Himself	Co-host	
2009–2012	Kabaretowy Klub Dwójki	Various roles		
2013–2014, 2016	Dzięki Bogu już weekend	Himself	Host in several episodes	
2013–2014, 2016	Dzięki Bogu już weekend	Various roles		
2014	Słodkie życie	Jurek		
2015	Latający Klub 2	Himself	Co-host	
2015	Latający Klub 2	Various roles		
2016	Kabaret na żywo	Various roles		
2017–2019	The Chairman's Ear	Jarosław	Main role; 45 episodes; also showrunner, and scriptwriter	
2017	The Chairman's Ear	Donald from Brussels	2 episodes	
2018	The Chairman's Ear	Eryk	Episode: "Kadry" (no. 41)	
2020	Państwo z kartonu	Robert	Main role; 12 episodes; also showrunner, and scriptwriter	
2021	Beautiful and Unemployed	Romek	Main role; 12 episodes; also showrunner, scriptwriter, and writer and performer of the theme song	

=== Polish dubbing ===
Year	Title	Role
2008	Bolt	Pigeon
2012	Adventures in Zambezia	Morton
2012	The Suicide Shop	Good person
2015	The New Adventures of Aladdin	Vizier
2017	Despicable Me 3	Balthazar Bratt

== Books ==
- 2000: Zeszyt w trzy linie (poetry book; co-written with Przemysław Borkowski and Mikołaj Cieślak)
- 2012: Jak zostałem premierem. Rozmowy pełne Moralnego Niepokoju (co-written with Mariusz Cieślik; published by Znak)
- 2019: Jak zostałem Prezesem (co-written with Monika Sobień-Górska; published by Czerwone i Czarne)
