= Spieprzaj dziadu! =

Polish phrase

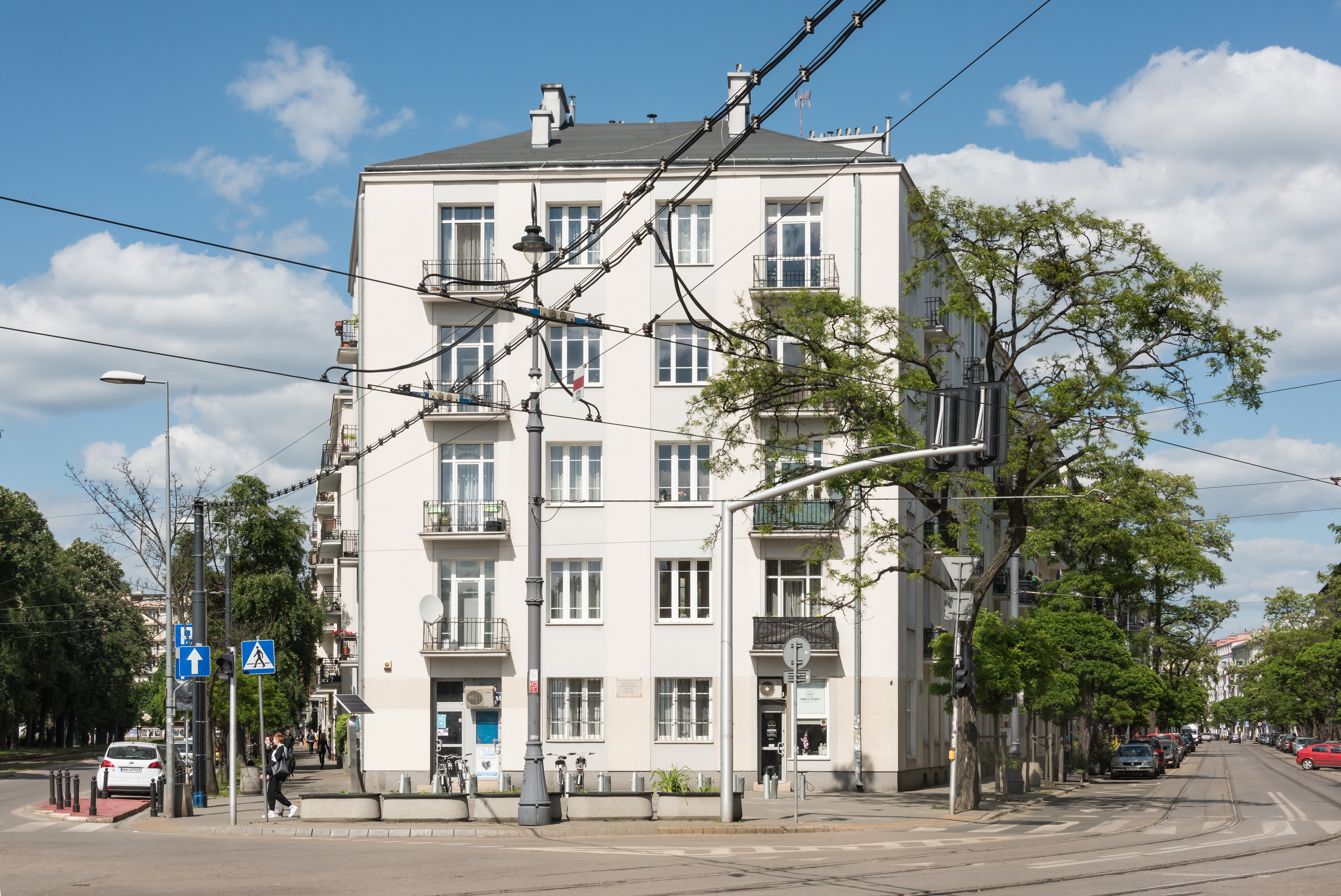
Intersection of Stalowa and 11 Listopada streets in Warsaw, where the incident took place

The phrase Spieprzaj dziadu! (lit. 'Fuck off old man!') was used by the late Polish President Lech Kaczyński on the street in the Praga district of Warsaw in response to a middle-aged heckler during the November 2002 Warsaw mayoral campaign.

On November 4, 2002, after an afternoon campaign meeting, Kaczyński was about to get into his car when an unidentified passerby wearing a hat and dark glasses heckled him.

Passerby: "You've changed parties, you've run away like rats."
Lech Kaczyński: "Sir, piss off Sir! That's what I'd say to you."
Passerby: "'Piss off, Sir'? Sir, you are just afraid of the truth!"
Lech Kaczyński (closing door, from the seat of his car): "Piss off, old man!"
Passerby (shouting to a journalist): "How can anyone respond like that: 'Piss off Sir'? I asked the man politely."

The name of the passerby was, as of November 2009, unknown. Since then the phrase had been quoted in television programmes and in films, had inspired websites, appeared on T-shirts and on a multitude of other objects. In 2024 the man has been identified as Zbigniew Aniszewski who still continued to confront the second of the Kaczyński twin brothers after more than 20 years.

== Implications ==
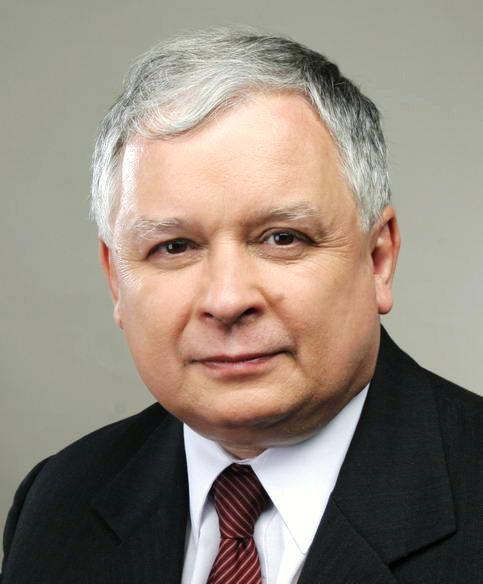
Lech Kaczyński in 2006

Afterwards, Lech Kaczyński explained that politicians also have the right to defend their honour: "I put up with the first lot of his insults. It was only after the second lot, that I told him firmly – though mildly for a Praga street – to go away."

In a separate incident in Lublin, in 2008, a man identified only as Przemysław D., 34, also shouted Spieprzaj, dziadu! in the vicinity of Kaczyński and was prosecuted for insulting the President. The Polish edition of Newsweek questioned, in its own editorial, how Kaczyński could have complained that someone was rude to him, when his own phrase used in 2002 was equally rude to someone else.

The phrase was brought up again by candidate Donald Tusk, during the 2005 presidential election campaign. On September 26, during a televised debate with Kaczyński. According to Tusk, Kaczyński's remark had caused a furore at the time.

In 2007, the Civic Platform political party included footage of the original incident in one of their campaign television advertisements. Also in 2007, Jerzy Szmajdziński, the leader of the Democratic Left Alliance, told Kaczyński Spieprzaj dziadu! after Kaczyński criticised the period of communism in Poland by saying that socialism was "a system run by riffraff for riffraff" (socjalizm to był ustrój hołoty, dla hołoty). Kaczyński and Szmajdziński both later died in the same plane crash in Smolensk.

In 2009, while in Lublin, a member of the Polish Parliament Janusz Palikot quoted the phrase in reference to Kaczyński and was reported to the police for insulting the President, a criminal offence in Poland. However, linguists were divided as to whether the insult, being a quotation, had a satirical function and was therefore protected by freedom of speech legislation.

== In Polish popular culture ==
The phrase has been repeated in various television programmes, notably the sitcom Świat według Kiepskich (The World According to the Kiepskis) and cult cartoon Włatcy móch. It is used in the Polish versions of the computer game The Witcher and also appears in a milder form (Zjeżdżaj, dziadu – "Get lost, old man") in the translations for the animated films Astérix at the Olympic Games, Open Season and The Simpsons Movie. Wristbands have also been produced by those opposed to Kaczyński sporting the phrase. In November 2009, seven years after the original incident, a new coin called the Seven Old Men of the Capital was introduced by a local businessman in Praga to commemorate the event. It was not legal tender, but could be exchanged for services in participating outlets in the Praga area. 10,000 coins were produced and each was worth seven zloty.

== See also ==
Similar political incidents:

- ¿Por qué no te callas?
- Casse-toi pov' con
- Fuddle duddle
