= MTV Music (Poland) =

- Country: Poland
- Network: MTV
- Headquarters: Warsaw (Poland)

Programming
- Language: Polish
- Picture format: 576i (16:9 SDTV)

Ownership
- Owner: ViacomCBS International Media Networks Polska
- Sister channels: MTV Poland; Comedy Central Poland

History
- Launched: 10 June 2000; 26 years ago
- Closed: 3 March 2020; 6 years ago
- Replaced by: MTV Music 24
- Former names: VIVA (2000-2017)

MTV Music (formerly VIVA) was a Polish 24h music and entertainment channel from Viacom International Media Networks Polska. The channel was launched on 10 June 2000 by the German VIVA Media AG.

== History ==
The first music video played on the channel was "A wszystko to... (bo ciebie kocham)" by Ich Troje.

On 1 December 2005, VIVA Poland relocated its broadcast center from Cologne to London and began broadcasting on transponder 11075 V, which at the time was owned by MTV Networks Europe on Hot Bird 13°E. This move resulted in VIVA Poland taking the place of MTV Nederland on Hot Bird 13°E, while MTV Nederland shifted to the Astra 19.2°E satellite.

On 22 June 2009, VIVA Poland underwent a visual rebranding, introducing a new dynamic logo that cycled through six colors every 20 seconds: blue, purple, sand, orange, green, and silver.

On 17 July 2012, VIVA Poland switched to 16:9 picture format and started to use the new logo. Since then VIVA has broadcast more reality programmes like Excused. Until 17 July 2012 the channel has broadcast FTA on Eutelsat Hot Bird 13A.

In 2014, the station cancelled local production programmes.

In 2015 - 2017, the station cancelled all reality programmes and continued playing only electronic dance music. Before the new broadcast schedule, the station was playing Polish and international pop, dance, rock and hip hop music.

On 17 October 2017, the channel was rebranded into MTV Music at 12:12.

The channel, along with VH1, closed on 3 March 2020, and replaced by MTV Music 24. The final music video played on the channel was "You Should Be Sad" by Halsey.

== Presenters ==
Current presenters
VJ	by VIVA	Programmes
Katarzyna Kępka	2004-2017	In & Out
Nina Kozieradzka	2013-2017	In & Out
Szymon Sokół	2013-2017	In & Out

=== Former presenters ===
- Małgorzata Halber
- Michał Marcińczyk
- Odeta Moro-Figurska
- Agnieszka Sielańczyk
- Jacek Graniecki
- Paweł Kapliński
- Tomasz Kleyff
- Maciej Gnatowski
- Emilia Piotrowska
- Mateusz Szymkowiak
- Michał Puzio
- Magdalena Polańska
- Wit Dziki
- Michał Marciniak
- Aleksandra Kot
- Aleksander Sikora (2011-2012)
- Rafał Sieraczek
- Marta Berens
- Aleks Sokołowska
- Łukasz Napora
- Róża Kulma
- Monika Pachnik
- Jacek Zimnik
- Pola Szczepaniak
- Karol Ronczewski
- Piotr Bartosiewicz
- Maciej Łuczkowski
- Ania
- Grzegorz
- Andrzej Rodzin
- Natalia Jakuła (2008-2012)
- Dariusz Rusin (2002-2013)

== Logo ==
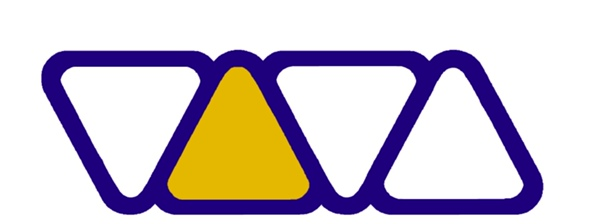
VIVA Logo used 10 June 2000 - 31 December 2001

VIVA Logo used 1 January 2002 - 30 November 2005

VIVA Logo used 1 December 2005 - 21 June 2009

VIVA Logo used 22 June 2009 - 16 July 2012

VIVA Logo used 17 July 2012 – 17 October 2017

MTV Music Logo used 17 October 2017 – 3 March 2020
