= Taniec z gwiazdami season 18 =

Taniec z gwiazdami
- Season 18
- Hosted by: Krzysztof Ibisz; Paulina Sykut-Jeżyna
- Judges: Andrzej Grabowski; Iwona Pavlović; Beata Tyszkiewicz; Michał Malitowski
- Celebrity winner: Anna Karczmarczyk
- Professional winner: Jacek Jeschke
- No. of episodes: 10

Release
- Original network: Polsat
- Original release: 4 March – 13 May 2016

Season chronology
- ← Previous; 17 Next → 19

The 18th season of Taniec z gwiazdami, the Polish edition of Dancing With the Stars, started on 4 March 2016. This was the fifth season aired on Polsat. Krzysztof Ibisz and new presenter Paulina Sykut-Jeżyna were the hosts and Beata Tyszkiewicz, Iwona Pavlović, Michał Malitowski and Andrzej Grabowski returned as judges.

On 13 May, Anna Karczmarczyk and her partner Jacek Jeschke were crowned the champions.

== Couples ==
Celebrity	Occupation	Professional partner	Status
Andrzej Krzywy	De Mono singer & television presenter	Magdalena Soszyńska-Michno	Eliminated 1st on 4 March 2016
Dorota Chotecka-Pazura	Film and television actress	Robert Kochanek	Eliminated 2nd on 11 March 2016
Waldemar Błaszczyk	Na Wspólnej actor	Nina Tyrka	Eliminated 3rd on 18 March 2016
Joanna Opozda	Pierwsza miłość actress and model	Kamil Kuroczko	Eliminated 4th on 1 April 2016
Kasia Stankiewicz	Varius Manx singer & songwriter	Tomasz Barański; Jacek Jeschke (Week 5)	Eliminated 5th on 15 April 2016
Nikodem Rozbicki	Film and television actor	Agnieszka Kaczorowska; Hanna Żudziewicz (Week 5)	Eliminated 6th on 15 April 2016
Izu Ugonoh	Boxer, kickboxer and actor	Hanna Żudziewicz; Valeriya Zhuravlyova (Week 5)	Eliminated 7th on 22 April 2016
Rafał Jonkisz	Mister Poland 2015, model & acrobat	Valeriya Zhuravlyova; Agnieszka Kaczorowska (Week 5)	Eliminated 8th on 29 April 2016
Julia Wróblewska	Tylko mnie kochaj and M jak miłość actress	Jan Kliment; Tomasz Barański (Week 5)	Third place on 6 May 2016
Elżbieta Romanowska	Ranczo actress & television presenter	Rafał Maserak; Jan Kliment (Week 5)	Runners-up on 13 May 2016
Anna Karczmarczyk	Film and television actress	Jacek Jeschke; Rafał Maserak (Week 5)	Winners on 13 May 2016

== Scores ==
Couple	Place	1	2	3	4	5	6	5+6	7	8	9		10
Anna & Jacek	1	40†	31	39	35	38	38+2=40	78	37+40=77	38+40=78†	39+39=78†	+40=118†	40+40+40=120
Elżbieta & Rafał	2	39	40†	40†	40†	39	31	70	39+39=78†	37+40=77	38+39=77	—	40+40+40=120
Julia & Jan	3	29	30	32	25	31	32	63‡	33+36=69	27+30=57‡	33+32=65‡	+36=101‡	
Rafał & Valeriya	4	33	33	36	29	29‡	32+2=34	63‡	29+37=66‡	30+33=63			
Izu & Hanna	5	39	40†	36	39	40†	39+2=41†	81†	36+40=76				
Nikodem & Agnieszka	6	27	27‡	25‡	24‡	34	32	66					
Kasia & Tomasz	7	30	37	33	32	35	28‡	63‡					
Joanna & Kamil	8	26‡	37	30	28								
Waldemar & Nina	9	35	34	34									
Dorota & Robert	10	32	31										
Andrzej & Magdalena	11	31											

Red numbers indicate the lowest score for each week.
Green numbers indicate the highest score for each week.
indicates the couple eliminated that week.
indicates the returning couple that finished in the bottom two or three.
this couple withdrew from the competition.
this couple was eliminated but later returned to the competition.
indicates the couple saved from elimination by immunity.
indicates the winning couple.
indicates the runner-up.
indicates the couple in third place.

== Average score chart ==
This table only counts for dances scored on a traditional 40-points scale.

Rank by average	Place	Couple	Total points	Number of dances	Average
1	2	Elżbieta & Rafał	581	15	38.7
2	5	Izu & Hanna	309	8	38.6
3	1	Anna & Jacek	614	16	38.4
4	9	Waldemar & Nina	103	3	34.3
5	7	Kasia & Tomasz	195	6	32.5
6	4	Rafał & Valeriya	321	10	32.1
7	10	Dorota & Robert	63	2	31.5
8	3	Julia & Jan	406	13	31.2
9	11	Andrzej & Magdalena	31	1	31.0
10	8	Joanna & Kamil	121	4	30.3
11	6	Nikodem & Agnieszka	169	6	28.2

== Highest and lowest scoring performances ==
The best and worst performances in each dance according to the judges' 40-point scale are as follows:

Dance	Best dancer(s)	Highest score	Worst dancer(s)	Lowest score
Cha-cha-cha	Izu Ugonoh	40	Nikodem Rozbicki	25
Waltz	Izu Ugonoh; Elżbieta Romanowska	39	Nikodem Rozbicki	27
Jive	Izu Ugonoh; Elżbieta Romanowska	40	Nikodem Rozbicki	27
Tango	Anna Karczmarczyk; Elżbieta Romanowska	40	Julia Wróblewska	30
Rumba	Anna Karczmarczyk	39	Rafał Jonkisz	30
Foxtrot	Elżbieta Romanowska; Anna Karczmarczyk	40	Julia Wróblewska	31
Paso Doble	Elżbieta Romanowska	40	Izu Ugonoh	36
Viennese Waltz	Anna Karczmarczyk; Elżbieta Romanowska	40	Rafał Jonkisz; Julia Wróblewska	32
Jazz	Rafał Jonkisz; Julia Wróblewska	36		
Samba	Anna Karczmarczyk	35	Nikodem Rozbicki	24
Quickstep	Anna Karczmarczyk	40	Joanna Opozda; Kasia Stankiewicz	28
Contemporary	Izu Ugonoh	40	Nikodem Rozbicki	34
Salsa	Elżbieta Romanowska	39	Julia Wróblewska	27
Freestyle	Anna Karczmarczyk; Elżbieta Romanowska	40		

== Couples' highest and lowest scoring dances ==
According to the traditional 40-point scale:

Couples	Highest scoring dance(s)	Lowest scoring dance(s)
Anna & Jacek	Tango (twice), Foxtrot (twice), Quickstep, Viennese Waltz, Freestyle (40)	Rumba (31)
Elżbieta & Rafał	Foxtrot, Tango (twice), Jive, Paso Doble, Freestyle, Viennese Waltz (40)	Samba (31)
Julia & Jan	Modern Jazz, Waltz (36)	Samba (25)
Rafał & Valeriya	Waltz (37)	Cha-cha-cha, Samba (29)
Izu & Hanna	Cha-cha-cha, Jive, Contemporary (40)	Paso Doble, Jive (36)
Nikodem & Agnieszka	Contemporary (34)	Samba (24)
Kasia & Tomasz	Rumba (37)	Quickstep (28)
Joanna & Kamil	Tango (37)	Cha-cha-cha (26)
Waldemar & Nina	Waltz (35)	Jive, Foxtrot (34)
Dorota & Robert	Waltz (32)	Cha-cha-cha (31)
Andrzej & Magdalena	Jive (31)	Jive (31)

== Weekly scores ==
Unless indicated otherwise, individual judges scores in the charts below (given in parentheses) are listed in this order from left to right: Andrzej Grabowski, Iwona Pavlović, Beata Tyszkiewicz and Michał Malitowski.

=== Week 1: Season Premiere ===
Running order

Couple	Score	Dance	Music	Result
Elżbieta & Rafał	39 (10,10,10,9)	Cha-cha-cha	"The Shoop Shoop Song (It's in His Kiss)"—Cher	Safe
Kasia & Tomasz	30 (8,6,9,7)	Cha-cha-cha	"Blame It on the Boogie"—The Jacksons	Safe
Waldemar & Nina	35 (10,8,9,8)	Waltz	"Oczarowanie"—Zbigniew Wodecki	Safe
Julia & Jan	29 (8,6,8,7)	Jive	"Happy"—Pharrell Williams	Safe
Izu & Hanna	39 (10,10,10,9)	Tango	"Jealousy"—The Malando Orchestra	Safe
Joanna & Kamil	26 (8,4,8,6)	Cha-cha-cha	"Lady Marmalade"—Labelle	Bottom two
Andrzej & Magdalena	31 (9,7,8,7)	Jive	"Karma Chameleon"—Culture Club	Eliminated
Dorota & Robert	32 (9,7,9,7)	Waltz	"If You Don't Know Me by Now"—Simply Red	Safe
Rafał & Valeriya	33 (9,7,9,8)	Jive	"Waterloo"—ABBA	Safe
Anna & Jacek	40 (10,10,10,10)	Tango	"El Choclo"—Ángel Villoldo	Safe
Nikodem & Agnieszka	27 (8,5,8,6)	Waltz	"What the World Needs Now Is Love"—Jackie DeShannon	Safe

=== Week 2 ===
Individual judges scores in the charts below (given in parentheses) are listed in this order from left to right: Andrzej Grabowski, Iwona Pavlović, Beata Tyszkiewicz and Stefano Terrazzino.

Running order

Couple	Score	Dance	Music	Result
Julia & Jan	30 (8,6,8,8)	Cha-cha-cha	"Na pewno"—Tabb & Sound'n'Grace	Safe
Anna & Jacek	31 (8,7,8,8)	Rumba	"Hello"—Adele	Safe
Rafał & Valeriya	33 (9,6,10,8)	Foxtrot	"Somethin' Stupid"—Frank Sinatra and Nancy Sinatra	Safe
Dorota & Robert	31 (9,5,9,8)	Cha-cha-cha	"Rivers of Babylon"—Boney M.	Eliminated
Nikodem & Agnieszka	27 (8,4,8,7)	Jive	"One Way or Another"—One Direction	Bottom two
Joanna & Kamil	37 (10,8,10,9)	Tango	"Un-Break My Heart"—Toni Braxton	Safe
Izu & Hanna	40 (10,10,10,10)	Cha-cha-cha	"Smooth Criminal"—Michael Jackson	Safe
Elżbieta & Rafał	40 (10,10,10,10)	Foxtrot	"Diamonds"—Rihanna	Safe
Waldemar & Nina	34 (10,7,9,8)	Jive	"Footloose"—Kenny Loggins	Safe
Kasia & Tomasz	37 (9,9,10,9)	Rumba	"Love Me like You Do"—Ellie Goulding	Safe

=== Week 3: My Place on Earth ===
Running order

Couple	Score	Dance	Music	Result
Izu & Hanna	36 (10,8,10,8)	Paso Doble	"Eye of the Tiger"—Survivor	Safe
Kasia & Tomasz	33 (9,8,9,7)	Waltz	"Orła cień"—Varius Manx	Bottom two
Nikodem & Agnieszka	25 (8,5,7,5)	Cha-cha-cha	"Tragedy"—Bee Gees	Safe
Anna & Jacek	39 (10,10,9,10)	Viennese Waltz	"I Have Nothing"—Whitney Houston	Safe
Rafał & Valeriya	36 (9,9,10,8)	Jazz	"Chariots of Fire"—Vangelis	Safe
Joanna & Kamil	30 (9,6,9,6)	Jive	"Take On Me"—A-ha	Safe
Julia & Jan	32 (10,6,8,8)	Waltz	"When I Fall in Love"—Nat King Cole	Safe
Waldemar & Nina	34 (10,7,10,7)	Foxtrot	"Careless Whisper"—Wham!	Eliminated
Elżbieta & Rafał	40 (10,10,10,10)	Tango	"Maria de Buenos Aires"—Astorpia quinteto Piazzolla	Safe

=== Week 4: Spring Breakers ===
Running order

Couple	Score	Dance	Music	Result
Anna & Jacek	35 (9,8,10,8)	Samba	"Tyle słońca w całym mieście"—Anna Jantar	Safe
Izu & Hanna	39 (10,10,10,9)	Quickstep	"Good Morning"—Miss Li	Safe
Elżbieta & Rafał	40 (10,10,10,10)	Jive	"W stronę słońca"—Ewelina Lisowska	Safe
Joanna & Kamil	28 (8,5,9,6)	Quickstep	"Walking On Sunshine"—Katrina and the Waves	Eliminated
Rafał & Valeriya	29 (9,5,9,6)	Cha-cha-cha	"Sugar"—Robin Schulz featuring Francesco Yates	Safe
Julia & Jan	25 (8,4,8,5)	Samba	"Best Day of My Life"—American Authors	Safe
Kasia & Tomasz	32 (9,7,9,7)	Jive	"Wszystko mi mówi, że mnie ktoś pokochał"—Skaldowie	Bottom three
Nikodem & Agnieszka	24 (7,4,8,5)	Samba	"Love Is in the Air"—John Paul Young	Bottom three

=== Week 5: Switch-Up Week ===
The couples were required to switch professional partners this week and learn a new style of dance. Due to the nature of the week, no elimination took place at the end of the show. At the end of the show it was revealed that Izu & Valeriya had the highest combined total of judges' scores and viewer votes, and the top three were still Elżbieta & Jan and Anna & Rafał, while Rafał & Agnieszka had the lowest total.

Running order

Couple	Score	Dance	Music
Rafał & Agnieszka	29 (9,5,9,6)	Samba	"Ai Se Eu Te Pego"—Michel Teló
Julia & Tomasz	31 (9,6,9,7)	Foxtrot	"Cherish"—Madonna
Nikodem & Hanna	34 (9,9,9,7)	Contemporary	"Pusty dom"—Grzegorz Hyży & TABB
Elżbieta & Jan	39 (10,10,10,9)	Quickstep	"Crazy in Love"—Beyoncé featuring Jay Z
Izu & Valeriya	40 (10,10,10,10)	Jive	"Gettin' In The Mood"—The Brian Setzer Orchestra
Kasia & Jacek	35 (9,8,10,8)	Tango	"Set Fire to the Rain"—Adele
Anna & Rafał	38 (10,9,10,9)	Cha-cha-cha	"Shut up and Dance"—Walk the Moon

=== Week 6: Animated Films Week ===
Running order

Couple	Score	Dance	Music	Animated film	Result
Kasia & Tomasz	28 (8,5,9,6)	Quickstep	"Heigh-Ho"—The Dwarfs Chorus	Snow White and the Seven Dwarfs	1st Eliminated
Rafał & Valeriya	32 (9,7,9,7)	Viennese Waltz	"When You Wish upon a Star"—Cliff Edwards	Pinocchio	Bottom two
Elżbieta & Rafał	31 (8,8,9,6)	Samba	"Wyginam śmiało ciało"—Jarosław Boberek	Madagascar	Safe
Izu & Hanna	39 (10,10,10,9)	Waltz	"Can You Feel the Love Tonight"—Elton John	The Lion King	Safe
Anna & Jacek	38 (10,10,9,9)	Contemporary	"Mam tę moc"—Katarzyna Łaska	Frozen	Safe
Julia & Jan	32 (10,6,9,7)	Viennese Waltz	"Over the Rainbow"—Judy Garland	The Wonderful Wizard of Oz	Safe
Nikodem & Agnieszka	32 (9,7,9,7)	Foxtrot	"NeverEnding Story"—Limahl	The NeverEnding Story	2nd Eliminated

Dance-offs
Couple	Judges votes	Dance	Music	Result
Izu & Hanna	Izu, Elżbieta, Izu, Izu	Cha-cha-cha	"Love Me Again"—John Newman	Winner (2 pts)
Elżbieta & Rafał	Izu, Elżbieta, Izu, Izu	Cha-cha-cha	"Love Me Again"—John Newman	Loser
Julia & Jan	Anna, Anna, Anna, Anna	Samba	"Livin' La Vida Loca"—Ricky Martin	Loser
Anna & Jacek	Anna, Anna, Anna, Anna	Samba	"Livin' La Vida Loca"—Ricky Martin	Winner (2 pts)
Nikodem & Agnieszka	Nikodem, Rafał, Rafał, Rafał	Jive	"Wake Me Up Before You Go-Go"—Wham!	Loser
Rafał & Valeriya	Nikodem, Rafał, Rafał, Rafał	Jive	"Wake Me Up Before You Go-Go"—Wham!	Winner (2 pts)

=== Week 7: Dedications Dances ===
Running order

Couple	Score	Dance	Music	Result
Julia & Jan	33 (9,7,9,8)	Jive	"She Loves You"—The Beatles	Bottom two
Julia & Jan	36 (10,8,10,8)	Modern Jazz	"Wznieś serce nad zło"—Ryszard Rynkowski	Bottom two
Rafał & Valeriya	29 (9,6,9,5)	Cha-cha-cha	"Cake by the Ocean"—DNCE	Safe
Rafał & Valeriya	37 (10,8,10,9)	Waltz	"Wielka miłość"—Seweryn Krajewski	Safe
Izu & Hanna	36 (10,8,10,8)	Jive	"Hallelujah I Love Her So"—Brenda Lee	Eliminated
Izu & Hanna	40 (10,10,10,10)	Contemporary	"Another Love"—Tom Odell	Eliminated
Elżbieta & Rafał	39 (10,10,10,9)	Salsa	"Vivir Mi Vida"—Marc Anthony	Safe
Elżbieta & Rafał	39 (10,10,10,9)	Waltz	"Memory"—Barbra Streisand	Safe
Anna & Jacek	37 (10,9,10,8)	Cha-cha-cha	"I Wanna Dance with Somebody"—Whitney Houston	Safe
Anna & Jacek	40 (10,10,10,10)	Foxtrot	"Jej czarne oczy"—Ivan & Delfin	Safe

=== Week 8: Movie Week (Trio Challenge) ===
Running order

Couple (Trio Dance Partner)	Score	Dance	Music	Movie	Result
Rafał & Valeriya (Kamil Kuroczko)	30 (9,7,9,5)	Rumba	"Take My Breath Away"—Berlin	Top Gun	Eliminated
Rafał & Valeriya (Kamil Kuroczko)	33 (9,8,9,7)	Viennese Waltz	"Hedwig's Theme"—John Williams	Harry Potter	Eliminated
Julia & Jan (Agnieszka Kaczorowska)	27 (8,5,8,6)	Salsa	"(I've Had) The Time of My Life"—Bill Medley and Jennifer Warnes	Dirty Dancing	Safe
Julia & Jan (Agnieszka Kaczorowska)	30 (8,7,8,7)	Tango	"Mamma Mia"—ABBA	Mamma Mia!	Safe
Elżbieta & Rafał (Tomasz Barański)	37 (10,9,10,8)	Tango	"Love Theme from the Godfather"—Nino Rota	The Godfather	Safe
Elżbieta & Rafał (Tomasz Barański)	40 (10,10,10,10)	Paso Doble	"Star Wars Main Theme"—John Williams	Star Wars	Safe
Anna & Jacek (Hanna Żudziewicz)	38 (10,9,10,9)	Waltz	"My Heart Will Go On"—Celine Dion	Titanic	Safe
Anna & Jacek (Hanna Żudziewicz)	40 (10,10,10,10)	Quickstep	"Vabank"—Henryk Kuźniak	Vabank	Safe

=== Week 9: Semi-final ===
Running order

Couple	Score	Dance	Music	Result
Julia & Jan	33 (9,8,9,7)	Quickstep	"I'm So Excited"—The Pointer Sisters	Bottom two
Julia & Jan	32 (9,7,9,7)	Cha-cha-cha	"Ocean Drive"—Duke Dumont	Bottom two
Elżbieta & Rafał	38 (10,10,10,8)	Rumba	"I'm Not the Only One"—Sam Smith	Safe
Elżbieta & Rafał	39 (10,10,10,9)	Foxtrot	"Raindrops Keep Falling on My Head"—Burt Bacharach	Safe
Anna & Jacek	39 (10,10,10,9)	Jive	"Single Ladies (Put a Ring on It)"—Beyoncé	Bottom two
Anna & Jacek	39 (10,10,10,9)	Rumba	"The Most Beautiful Girl in the World"—Prince	Bottom two

Dance-off

Running order

Couple	Score	Dance	Music	Result
Julia & Jan	36 (10,8,9,9)	Waltz	"When I Fall in Love"—Nat King Cole	Eliminated
Anna & Jacek	40 (10,10,10,10)	Viennese Waltz	"I Have Nothing"—Whitney Houston	Safe

=== Week 10: Season Finale ===
Running order

Couple (Judge)	Score	Dance	Music	Result
Elżbieta & Rafał (Michał Malitowski)	40 (10,10,10,10)	Tango	"Libertango"—Astor Piazzolla	Runners-up
Elżbieta & Rafał (Michał Malitowski)	40 (10,10,10,10)	Freestyle	"Satin birds"—Abel Korzeniowski "Clock Tick"—Abel Korzeniowski	Runners-up
Elżbieta & Rafał (Michał Malitowski)	40 (10,10,10,10)	Viennese Waltz	"One and Only"—Adele	Runners-up
Anna & Jacek (Iwona Pavlović)	40 (10,10,10,10)	Tango	"El Tango de Roxanne"—Jacek Koman from Moulin Rouge!	Winners
Anna & Jacek (Iwona Pavlović)	40 (10,10,10,10)	Freestyle	"Song from a Secret Garden" – Secret Garden	Winners
Anna & Jacek (Iwona Pavlović)	40 (10,10,10,10)	Foxtrot	"Piosenka księżycowa"—Varius Manx	Winners

== Dance chart ==
The celebrities and professional partners danced one of these routines for each corresponding week:

- Week 1 (Season Premiere): Cha-cha-cha, Waltz, Jive, Tango
- Week 2: One unlearned dance (introducing Foxtrot, Rumba)
- Week 3 (My Place on Earth): One unlearned dance (introducing Paso Doble, Viennese Waltz, Jazz)
- Week 4 (Spring Breakers): One unlearned dance (introducing Quickstep, Samba)
- Week 5 (Switch-Up Week): One unlearned dance (introducing Contemporary)
- Week 6 (Animated Films Week): One unlearned dance and dance-offs
- Week 7 (Dedications Dances): One repeated dance and one unlearned dance (introducing Salsa) (Note: Week 7: Elżbieta & Rafał: two unlearned dances)
- Week 8 (Movie Week/Trio Challenge): Two unlearned dances (trio dances for second round) (Note: Week 8: Rafał & Valeriya and Elżbieta & Rafał: one repeated dance and one unlearned dance)
- Week 9 (Semi-final): One repeated dance and one unlearned dance and dance-offs
- Week 10 (Season Final): Judges' choice, Freestyle and couple's favorite dance of the season (Note: Elżbieta & Rafał: unlearned dance as final dance)

Couple	1	2	3	4	5	6		7		8		9			10		
Anna & Jacek	Tango	Rumba	Viennese Waltz	Samba	Cha-cha-cha (Anna & Rafał)	Contemporary	Samba	Cha-cha-cha	Foxtrot	Waltz	Quickstep	Jive	Rumba	Viennese Waltz	Tango	Freestyle	Foxtrot
Elżbieta & Rafał	Cha-cha-cha	Foxtrot	Tango	Jive	Quickstep (Elżbieta & Jan)	Samba	Cha-cha-cha	Salsa	Waltz	Tango	Paso Doble	Rumba	Foxtrot	- (Immunity)	Tango	Freestyle	Viennese Waltz
Julia & Jan	Jive	Cha-cha-cha	Waltz	Samba	Foxtrot (Julia & Tomasz)	Viennese Waltz	Samba	Jive	Modern Jazz	Salsa	Tango	Quickstep	Cha-cha-cha	Waltz			Viennese Waltz
Rafał & Valeriya	Jive	Foxtrot	Jazz	Cha-cha-cha	Samba (Rafał & Agnieszka)	Viennese Waltz	Jive	Cha-cha-cha	Waltz	Rumba	Viennese Waltz						Viennese Waltz
Izu & Hanna	Tango	Cha-cha-cha	Paso Doble	Quickstep	Jive (Izu & Valeriya)	Waltz	Cha-cha-cha	Jive	Contemporary								Viennese Waltz
Nikodem & Agnieszka	Waltz	Jive	Cha-cha-cha	Samba	Contemporary (Nikodem & Hanna)	Foxtrot	Jive										Viennese Waltz
Kasia & Tomasz	Cha-cha-cha	Rumba	Waltz	Jive	Tango (Kasia & Jacek)	Quickstep											Viennese Waltz
Joanna & Kamil	Cha-cha-cha	Tango	Jive	Quickstep													Viennese Waltz
Waldemar & Nina	Waltz	Jive	Foxtrot														Viennese Waltz
Dorota & Robert	Waltz	Cha-cha-cha															Viennese Waltz
Andrzej & Magdalena	Jive																Viennese Waltz

Highest scoring dance
Lowest scoring dance
Performed, but not scored
Gained bonus points for winning this dance-off
Gained no bonus points for losing this dance-off

== Call-out order ==
Order	Week 1	Week 2	Week 3	Week 4	Week 5+6	Week 7	Week 8	Week 9	Week 10
1	Elżbieta & Rafał	Izu & Hanna	Elżbieta & Rafał	Elżbieta & Rafał	Izu & Hanna	Anna & Jacek	Anna & Jacek	Elżbieta & Rafał	Anna & Jacek
2	Anna & Jacek	Joanna & Kamil	Anna & Jacek	Izu & Hanna	Julia & Jan	Elżbieta & Rafał	Elżbieta & Rafał	Anna & Jacek	Elżbieta & Rafał
3	Izu & Hanna	Elżbieta & Rafał	Julia & Jan	Julia & Jan	Anna & Jacek	Rafał & Valeriya	Julia & Jan	Julia & Jan	
4	Rafał & Valeriya	Julia & Jan	Rafał & Valeriya	Anna & Jacek	Elżbieta & Rafał	Julia & Jan	Rafał & Valeriya		
5	Julia & Jan	Rafał & Valeriya	Joanna & Kamil	Rafał & Valeriya	Rafał & Valeriya	Izu & Hanna			
6	Waldemar & Nina	Kasia & Tomasz	Izu & Hanna	Kasia & Tomasz	Nikodem & Agnieszka				
7	Nikodem & Agnieszka	Anna & Jacek	Nikodem & Agnieszka	Nikodem & Agnieszka	Kasia & Tomasz				
8	Kasia & Tomasz	Waldemar & Nina	Kasia & Tomasz	Joanna & Kamil					
9	Dorota & Robert	Nikodem & Agnieszka	Waldemar & Nina						
10	Joanna & Kamil	Dorota & Robert							
11	Andrzej & Magdalena								

This couple came in first place with the judges.
This couple came in last place with the judges.
This couple came in last place with the judges and was eliminated.
This couple was eliminated.
This couple withdrew from the competition.
This couple was saved from elimination by immunity.
This couple won the competition.
This couple came in second in the competition.
This couple came in third in the competition.

== Guest performances ==
Date	Artist(s)	Song(s)	Dancers
4 March 2016	Tomasz Szymuś's Orchestra	"Let's Dance"	All professional dancers
18 March 2016	Kasia Stankiewicz	"Orła cień"	Kasia Stankiewicz & Tomasz Barański
18 March 2016	Beata Kozidrak	"Bingo"	VOLT dance group
1 April 2016	Tomasz Szymuś's Orchestra	"Wiosna"	All professional dancers
1 April 2016	Ewelina Lisowska	"W stronę słońca"	Elżbieta Romanowska & Rafał Maserak
8 April 2016	Tomasz Szymuś's Orchestra	"Earned It"	All couples
8 April 2016	Tomasz Szymuś's Orchestra	"Don't Be So Shy"	Hanna Żudziewicz & Jacek Jeschke
8 April 2016	De Mono	"Póki na to czas"	—
15 April 2016	Tomasz Szymuś's Orchestra	songs for Alice's Adventures in Wonderland	Formation Slow Dance
22 April 2016	Tomasz Szymuś's Orchestra	"Don't Stop the Music"	Kashira and Grupa Estradowa FLAME
22 April 2016	Ryszard Rynkowski	"Wznieś serce nad zło"	Julia Wróblewska & Jan Kliment
22 April 2016	Ivan Komarenko	"Jej czarne oczy"	Anna Karczmarczyk & Jacek Jeschke
22 April 2016	Tomasz Szymuś's Orchestra	"Purple Rain"	—
29 April 2016	Tomasz Szymuś's Orchestra	"(I've Had) The Time of My Life" "Cell Block Tango" "Singin' in the Rain" "You're the One That I Want"	VOLT dance group
29 April 2016	Paulina Sykut-Jeżyna	"Szklana pogoda"	—
5 May 2016	Urszula	"Na Sen"	Ewelina Lisowska & Tomasz Barański (Season 17 champion)
13 May 2016	Tomasz Szymuś's Orchestra	"Don't Worry"	All professional dancers and celebrities
13 May 2016	Tomasz Szymuś's Orchestra		Flamenco
13 May 2016	Stefano Terrazzino and Belli RiBelli	"Tu Vuò Fà L'Americano" "Nie płacz kiedy odjadę" "Quando to kiedy"	Agnieszka Kaczorowska, Magdalena Soszyńska-Michno, Nina Tyrka, Valeriya Zhuravlyova, Hanna Żudziewicz
13 May 2016	Kasia Stankiewicz	"Piosenka księżycowa"	Anna Karczmarczyk & Jacek Jeschke
13 May 2016	Tabb & Sound'n'Grace	"Dach"	Valeriya Zhuravlyova, Hanna Żudziewicz, Kamil Mokrzycki

== Rating figures ==
Date	Episode	Official rating 4+	Share 4+	Official rating 16–49	Share 16–49
4 March 2016	1	2 856 323	18.42%	—N/a	—N/a
11 March 2016	2	3 004 968	19.52%	—N/a	—N/a
18 March 2016	3	2 985 182	19.52%	—N/a	—N/a
1 April 2016	4	2 839 764	17.86%	—N/a	—N/a
8 April 2016	5	2 603 323	16.97%	—N/a	—N/a
15 April 2016	6	2 938 911	19.75%	—N/a	—N/a
22 April 2016	7	2 817 648	19.21%	—N/a	—N/a
29 April 2016	8	2 837 022	20.20%	—N/a	—N/a
6 May 2016	9	2 921 546	21.24%	—N/a	—N/a
13 May 2016	10	3 036 144	21.41%	—N/a	—N/a
Average	Spring 2016	2 886 204	19.35%	751 021	13.35%
