= Jonkisz =

Jonkisz is a surname. Notable people with the surname include:

- Kazimierz Jonkisz (born 1948), Polish jazz drummer
- Rafał Jonkisz (born 1997), Polish model
