= Państwo z kartonu =

2020 comedy-drama television series

- Title card
- Genre: Comedy drama
- Developed by: Robert Górski
- Written by: Robert Górski
- Starring: Robert Górski; Monika Sobień-Górska
- Theme music composer: Michał Piastowicz
- Country of origin: Poland
- Original language: Polish
- No. of seasons: 1
- No. of episodes: 12

Production
- Editor: Michał Piastowicz
- Running time: 10 minutes
- Production company: IZK

Original release
- Network: WP
- Release: April 26 – July 12, 2020

Państwo z kartonu (Polish: [ˈpaɲ.stfɔ zɘ̟ karˈtɔ.nu]; lit. 'Carboard State') is a comedy-drama television series created and written by Robert Górski. It was filmed during COVID-19 pandemic, while Górski and his wife, Monika Sobień-Górska, remained in a self-isolation in their house. Tougher with their one-year-old daughter, Malina Górska, they were the only actors in the show. The series premiered on 26 April 2020, on WP television channel, and on its website, wideo.wp.pl, and its final, 12th episode, aired on 12 July 2020.

== Premise ==
Robert and Monika, a married couple, and their one-year-old daughter, Malina, spent a lot of time locked together in their home, in a self-isolation during the 2020 COVID-19 pandemic.

== Cast ==
- Robert Górski as Robert
- Monika Sobień-Górska as Monika
- Malina Górska as Malina

== Production ==
The show was created by comedian Robert Górski in 2020, while he remained self-isolated in his house, with his wife Monika Sobień-Górska, and their one-year-old daughter, Malina Górska, during the COVID-19 pandemic. It was filmed on a smartphone, with Robert and Monika being the only actors. It was the acting debut of Monika Sobień-Górska. The show premiered on 26 April 2020, on WP television channel, and on its website, wideo.wp.pl. It consists of 12 episodes. The final episode aired on 12 July 2020.
