= Dupa biskupa =

Polish card games

Dupa biskupa ([ˈdupa bisˈkupa]) refers to several Polish card games: a trick-taking game in which the aim is to avoid taking the Q♦; a go fish style game in which players collect suits; a shedding game (also known as Pan); and a social party game.

The name is a Polish phrase meaning "bishop's bum".

== Social game ==
The party game known as dupa biskupa can be played with any set of cards and any number of players, over any number of rounds. There is one general rule; the more players there are, the more cards are required.

The game starts with cards being dealt so that each player receives the same amount. Starting from the first, players lay down cards in such a way that everyone can see the card. Having laid the card, the player has to perform a certain action established before starting the game, and corresponding to the suit and rank of the card. Some suits or ranks require that the player perform no action.

In the first round, the only cards with actions are:-

- When playing any queen, all players have to say "Bonjour, madame!" ("Good morning, ma'am!")
- When playing any king, all players have to say "Bonjour, monsieur!" ("Good morning, sir!")
- When playing any ace, all players have to say "Dupa biskupa!” ("Bishop's bottom!")

In the first round there is no behaviour attributed to other cards. The winner of each round attributes a way of acting to other cards in the next round, but the actions for queens, kings and aces remains the same.

Players who perform the wrong action, or fail to perform one when required, are obliged to take the pile of cards (splitting the pile between them if multiple players fail in this way). The game should be watched by a neutral observer who indicates when a mistake has been made, and who is at fault.

The first player to empty their hand wins the game.

=== Variations ===
In the popular version of the game the first round is skipped and the following actions are attributed to the cards from the beginning:

- When 10 is laid, all the players have to place their hands on the stack of cards. Last person to do so takes all the cards.
- When 4 or 9 is laid, players do nothing
- When jack is laid, players have to salute

=== Popular culture ===
In Polish adult animated comedy series Włatcy móch, two recurring characters Marcel and The colonel (two zombies living at a local graveyard) were seen playing dupa biskupa on a tombstone. The colonel won the game.
