= Mikołaj Cieślak =

Polish actor

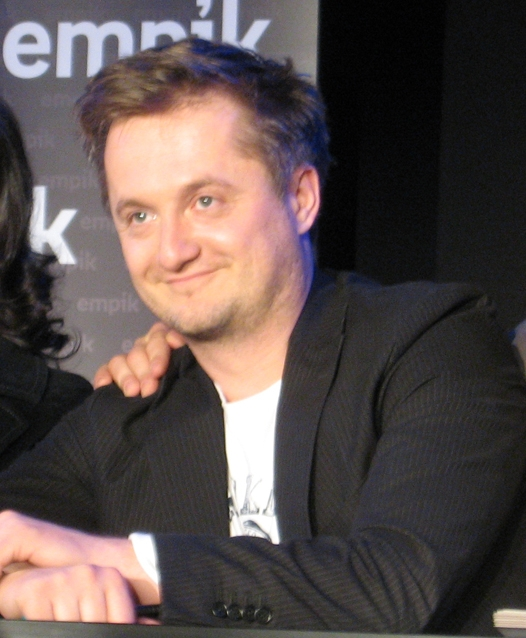
- Mikołaj Cieślak in 2008
- Born: Mikołaj Cieślak; December 6, 1973 (age 52); Warsaw, Poland
- Education: University of Warsaw
- Occupations: Actor; voice actor; director; cabaret artist
- Years active: 1994–present
- Children: 2

Mikołaj Cieślak (Polish pronunciation: [miˈkɔ.waj ˈt͡ɕɛ.ɕlak]; born 6 December 1973) is a Polish stage, television and film actor, and a cabaret artist. He is a co-creator of Kabaret Moralnego Niepokoju.

== Biography ==
Cieślak was born on 6 December 1973 in Warsaw, Poland. In 1993, while studying at the technological department of the University of Warsaw, he and other students had formed the cabaret group, that would later evolve into the Kabaret Moralnego Niepokoju. Their first cabaret programme, titled Królewna, Rycerz i Smok, had premiered in 1994 at the Polish studies department of the University of Warsaw. In 1996, the cabaret group was awarded the Grand Prix at the PaKA festival in Kraków.

He also performed in the Capitol Theatre, Warsaw, in comedies Szwedzki stół by Marek Modzelewski in 2012, and Zdrówko by Robert Górski in 2014. In February 2015, he performed in the Polish-Italian-language play Quasi-Paradiso, directed by Robert Talarczyk, that was performed in Teatro Astra, Turin, Italy.

== Private life ==
He is married and has two daughters, Maja and Jagoda.

== Filmography ==
=== Films ===
Year	Title	Role	Notes
2009	Złoty środek	Piotr	Feature film
2016	Doradcy króla Hydropsa	Diopter	Short film; voice
2019	How to Marry A Millionaire	Taxi passenger	Feature film
2020	Fierce	Man	Feature film
2021	The Getaway King	Negotiating client	Feature film
2022	Gdzie diabeł nie może, tam baby pośle	German person	Feature film
2023	Squared Love All Over Again	Krzysztof	Feature film
2024	No Pressure	Investor	Feature film
2024	Letters to Santa 6	Staszek	Feature film

=== TV series ===
Year	Title	Role	Notes
1999	Badziewiakowie	Firefighter	Episode: "Słomiany wdowiec" (no. 8)
2000	13 posterunek	Cheese Murderer	Episode: "Stażysta" (no. 49)
2002	Kuba Wojewódzki	Himself	Talk show; 1 episode
2012	Ja to mam szczęście!	Jarosław Klata	Episode no. 42
2012	Piąty Stadion	Crazy Staszek	Episode: "Polska–Andora" (no. 40)
2013–2014	Wrzuć na luuuz	Fisherman	Episode no. 1
2013–2014	Wrzuć na luuuz	Zaleśny	Episode no. 2
2013–2014	Wrzuć na luuuz	Piotr's neighbour	6 episodes
2013–2014	Wrzuć na luuuz	Bus driver	Episode no. 4
2013–2014	Wrzuć na luuuz	Teofil Łapa	Episode no. 6
2013–2014	Wrzuć na luuuz	Natalia Kukulska's manager	Episode no. 7
2013–2014	Wrzuć na luuuz	Aphrodite	Episode no. 9
2014	Słodkie życie	Janusz Chmiel	Also screenwriter
2014	Co leci w sieci	Cabaret artist	
2016	Dwoje we troje	Sale hunter	Episode: "Firmówki" (no. 32)
2016	Dwoje we troje	Bank employee	Episode: "Oszczędni" (no. 34)
2016	I'll Be Fine	Gorzelniak	Episode no. 36
2017	Na dobre i na złe	Tomasz, Halina's partner	Episode no. 676
2017–2019	The Chairman's Ear	Mariusz	Main role; 57 episodes; also director
2018–2019	Za marzenia	Erwin Anielak	10 episodes
2019	39 and a Half Week	Herbalist	2 episodes
2019–2021	Zainwestuj w marzenia	Erwin Anielak	42 episodes
2021	Beautiful and Unemployed	Gwidon	Main role; 12 episodes
2021–2022	Kowalscy kontra Kowalscy	Hamlet Wołodyjowski	9 episodes
2022	Father Matthew	Doctor Suchocki	Episode: "Zmiana" (no. 346)
2023	Tajemnice polskich fortun	German person	2 episodes

==== Polish-language dubbing ====
Year	Title	Role	Notes
2012	The Suicide Shop	Desperate person	Feature film
2012	Adventures in Zambezia	Marabou stork	Feature film
2017	Despicable Me 3	Dru	Feature film

== Theatre roles ==
- 2012: Szwedzki stół, directed by Marek Modzelewski (Capitol Theatre, Warsaw)
- 2014: Zdrówko, directed by Robert Górski (Capitol Theatre, Warsaw)
- 2015: Quasi-Paradiso, directed by Robert Talarczyk (Teatro Astra, Turin)
