= Anna Karczmarczyk =

Polish actress (born 1991)

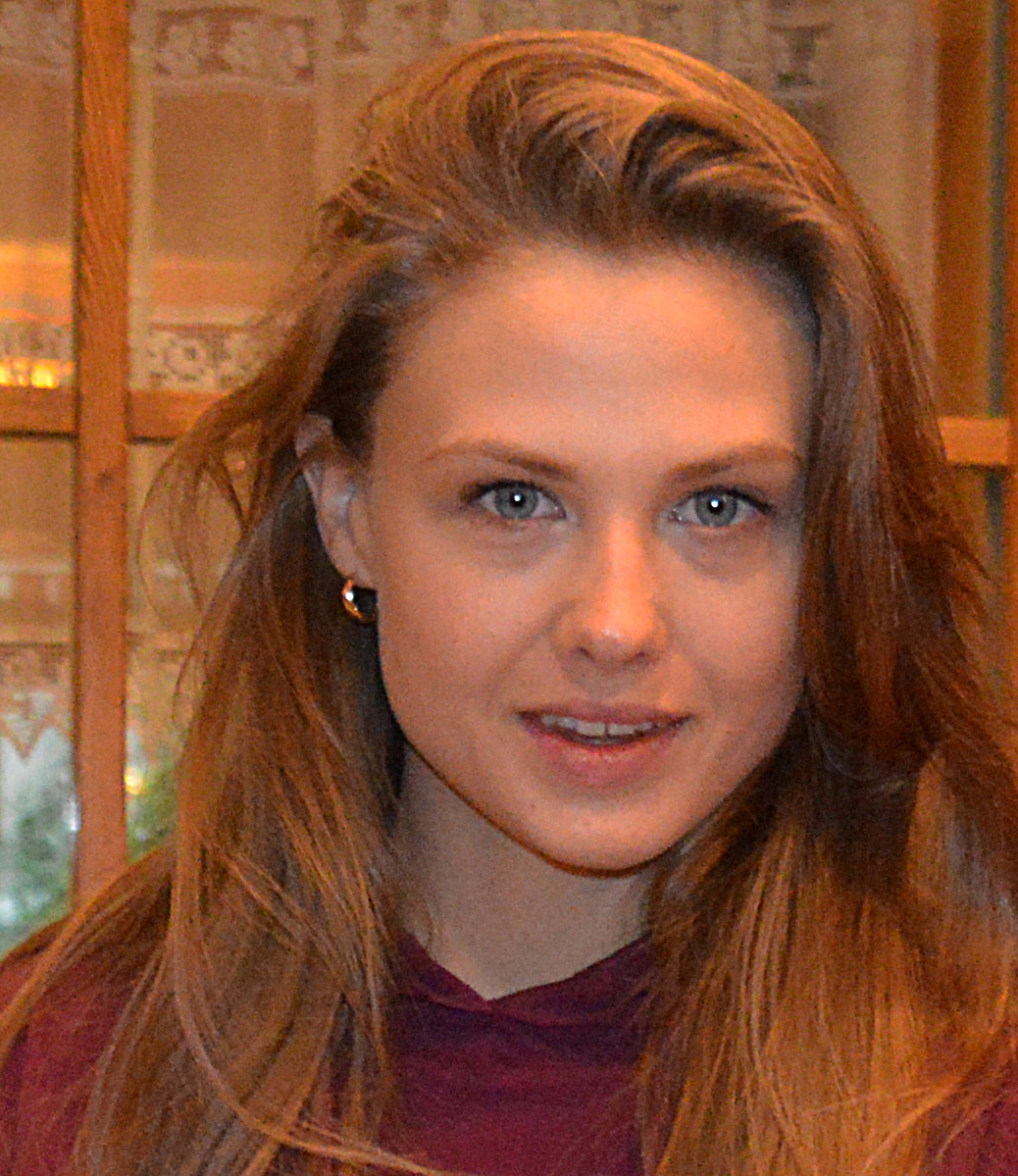
- Karczmarczyk in 2019
- Born: 24 September 1991 (age 34); Warsaw, Poland
- Education: National Academy of Dramatic Art
- Occupation: Actress
- Years active: 2006–present
- Spouse: Pascal Litwin (m. 2018)
- Children: 1

Anna Karczmarczyk (Polish pronunciation: [ˈan.na karˈt͡ʂmar.t͡ʂɘk]; born 24 September 1991) is a Polish actress.

== Biography ==
Karczmarczyk was born in Warsaw to Dariusz and Iwona Karczmarczyk. She has two siblings. She graduated from the National Academy of Dramatic Art in 2016. That year, she and Jacek Jeschke won the 18th season of Dancing with the Stars. Taniec z gwiazdami.

She married Pascal Litwin in 2018. They have one child, born in 2021.

== Filmography ==
=== Film ===
Year	Title	Role	Ref.
2009	Galerianki	Alicja	
2011	Weekend	"Młoda"	
2013	Life Feels Good	Anka	
2014	Killing Love	Wika	
2015	Wkręceni 2	Cashier	
2015	Sprawiedliwy	Zosia	
2016	Pitbull: New Orders	Iwona	
2018	Gotowi na wszystko	Drummer	
2018	Serce nie sługa	Marta	
2019	Fighter	Zosia	
2019	Politics	Barbara	
2019	How I Became a Gangster	Zosia	
2021	Girls to Buy	Joanna	
2022	Mój dług	Agata	
2023	All That Sex	Maja	

=== Television ===
Year	Title	Role	Notes	Ref.
2009	Przystań	Ola	1 episode	
2010–2012	L for Love	Aleksandra "Ola" Malinowska	55 episodes	
2012	Siła wyższa	Monika	1 episode	
2013	Hotel 52	Tosia Rutkowska	8 episodes	
2013–2017	Father Matthew	Diana / Agata	2 episodes	
2013–2018	Na dobre i na złe	Ola Pietrzak	73 episodes	
2014	To nie koniec świata	Blanka	10 episodes	
2016	Powiedz tak!	Natalia	3 episodes	
2016	Strażacy	Edyta	4 episodes	
2017	The Chairman's Ear	Malwina	1 episode	
2018–2019	Za marzenia	Anka Wolańska	26 episodes	
2020	Ludzie i bogowie	Bronisława Lenart	8 episodes	
2021	Beautiful and Unemployed	Krysia	12 episodes	
2021	Zakochani po uszy	Karolina Laskowska	60 episodes	
2021–2022	Tatuśkowie	Liliana Malinowska	72 episodes	
2024	The Bay of Spies	Lotta Linke	2 episodes	
2024	Prosta sprawa	Monia	3 episodes	
2024	Zdrada	Julia Wysocka	12 episodes	

=== Music videos ===
Year	Title	Artist	Role
2019	"Serce nie sluga"	Ania	Herself
2019	"Lek"	Pawbeats featuring Ania	Herself
