= Paweł Koślik =

Polish actor (born 1979)

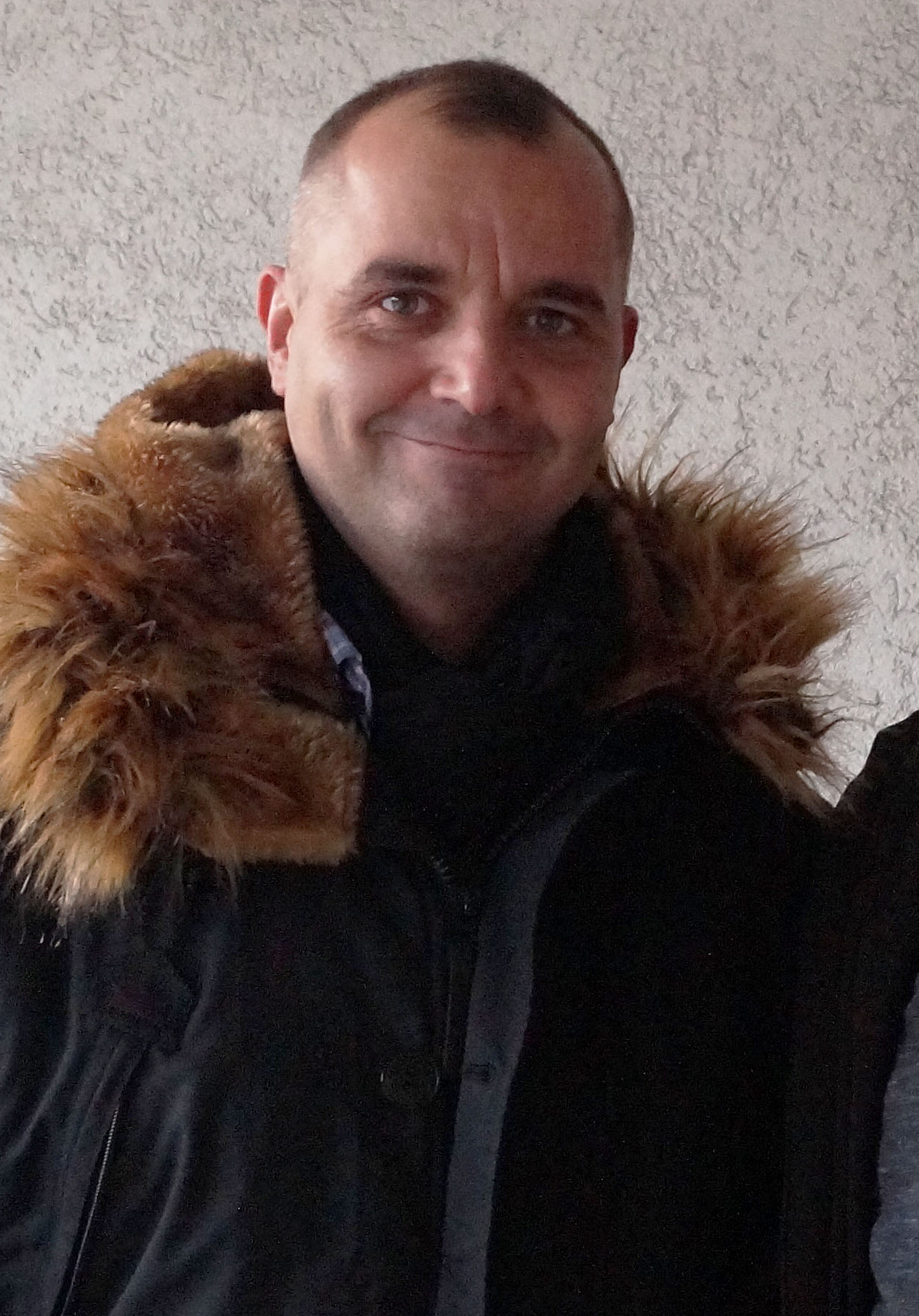
- Paweł Koślik in 2018.
- Born: 18 October 1979 (age 46); Zgorzelec, Poland
- Education: Aleksander Zelwerowicz National Academy of Dramatic Art
- Occupations: Actor; Comedian
- Years active: 2002 – present

Paweł Koślik (Polish: [ˈpa.vɛw 'kɔɕ.lik]; born 18 October 1979) is a Polish film, television, and stage actor and comedian. He is best known for portraying President Andrzej (based on Andrzej Duda, president of Poland) in Showmax political satire webseries The Chairman's Ear (2017–2019), and Wacek Gąsior in the Polsat Box Go sitcom series Swaci (2022–2023). Koślik is also a member of the cabaret comedy group Kabaret na Koniec Świata.

== Biography ==
Paweł Koślik was born on 18 October 1979 in Zgorzelec, Poland. In 2003, he graduated from the Faculty of Acting of the Aleksander Zelwerowicz National Academy of Dramatic Art in Warsaw, Poland. From 2005 to 2012, he regularly performed in the Arnold Szyfman Polish Theatre in Warsaw, and since 2012, he has been a member of the cabaret comedy group Kabaret na Koniec Świata.

Koślik debuted on the screen in 2002, appearing in television series Plebania, Na dobre i na złe, and Samo życie. In 2005, he appeared in his first feature film, with a small role in Lawstorant. He is best known for portraying President Andzej (based on Andrzej Duda, president of Poland) in Showmax political satire webseries The Chairman's Ear (2017–2019), and Wacek Gąsior in the Polsat Box Go sitcom series Swaci (2022–2023). He also appeared in series such as Tak miało być (2005–2006), 39 and a Half (2008), Barwy szczęścia (2011), Father Matthew (2012, 2022), True Law (2012), Piąty Stadion (2012), Komisarz Alex (2013), Na dobre i na złe (2002, 2013, 2019), Medics (2014), Dwoje we troje (2016), I'll Be Fine (2016), Niania w wielkim mieście (2017), Barwy szczęścia (2019), Mały zgon (2020), Usta usta (2020), Raven (2021), High Water (2022), Queen (2022), and Tylko nie piątek! (2023). He also had roles in feature films such as Referee of Attention (2014), The King of Life (2015), Playing Hard (2018), Supernova (2019), The Getaway King (2020), Lokatorka (2021), Locked in a Loveshack (2021), Święta inaczej (2022), Mother's Day (2023), Woman Of… (2023), No Pressure (2024), and Misie (2025).

== Private life ==
Koślik stated that he is struggling with the major depressive disorder.

== Filmography ==
=== Films ===
Year	Title	Role	Notes
2002	Na jelenie	Driver	Short film
2004	Żegnaj, Judaszu	Jan	Television play
2005	Lawstorant	Police officer	Feature film
2006	The French Trick	Police officer at the pride parade	Feature film
2008	Przygody Sindbada Żeglarza	Sailor	Television play
2008	Tajny współpracownik	"Tomato"	Television play
2009	Powidoki		Television play
2009	Zero	Police officer	Feature film
2010	Ostatni dzień lata	Father	Short film
2014	Trashhhh!	Genius	Short film
2014	Udając ofiarę	Klepacki	Short film
2014	Jeziorak	Magiera	Short film
2014	Koncerty królewskie		Television film
2014	Referee of Attention	Mariusz	Feature film
2015	The King of Life	Andrzej	Feature film
2017	PolandJa	Scared clint in a kebab restaurant	Feature film
2017	Listy z Rosji	Passenger with a hat	Television play
2018	Outsider	Dentist	Feature film
2018	Klechdy	Iskrzycki	Short film
2018	Playing Hard	Emil	Feature film
2019	Supernova	Grzegorz	Feature film
2020	The Getaway King	"Hen-pecked husband" client	Feature film
2021	Lokatorka	Janusz Rzeźniczak	Feature films
2021	Locked in a Loveshack	Bernard Mondry "Nerd"	Feature film
2022	Święta inaczej	Włodek	Feature film
2022	Zołza	Man	Feature film
2023	Mother's Day	Maks's stepfather	Feature film
2023	Opowieść wigilijna		Television play
2023	Woman Of…	Waldek	Feature film
2024	No Pressure	Romek	Feature film
2025	Misie	Paweł	Feature film

=== Television series ===
Year	Title	Role	Notes
2002	Plebania	Priest Adam's mentee	Episode no. 186
2002	Na dobre i na złe	Swimming pool patron	Episode: "Lekarski debiut" (no. 124)
2002	Samo życie	Dęblin inhabitant	Episode no. 86
2003	L for Love	Journalist in the court	Episode no. 150
2003	Kasia i Tomek	Postman	Episode no. 63
2004	Crime Detectives	Counterterrorist officer	Episode: "Reporterzy" (no. 13)
2004	Samo życie	Security guard	Episode no. 373
2005–2006	Tak miało być	Zbyszek	6 episodes
2008	39 and a Half	Police officer	2 episodes
2009	Akademia	Antoni	Episode: "Antoni Zawodowiec" (no. 6)
2010	Samo życie	Leszek	Episode no. 1507
2011	Barwy szczęścia	Physician	3 episodes
2012	Father Matthew	Markowski	Episode: "Sklep z zabawkami" (no. 100)
2012	Friends	Police officer	Episode no. 11
2012	Szpilki na Giewoncie	Police officer	Episode no. 50
2012	True Law	Adam	Episode no. 8
2012–2014	Piąty Stadion	Hater	4 episodes
2013	Komisarz Alex	Robert Zieliński	Episode: "Pogrzebana żywcem" (no. 42)
2013	Na dobre i na złe	Zygmunt	2 episodes
2013	Na Wspólnej	Journalist	Episode no. 1754
2014	Krew z krwi	Prison physician	2 episodes
2014	Medics	Dr. Wilecki	Episode: "Za wszelką cenę" (no. 57)
2015	Firefighters	Fire station captain	Episode no. 3
2015	Na Wspólnej	Central Investigation Bureau of Police officer	3 episodes
2016	Dwoje we troje	Stefan	5 episodes
2016	I'll Be Fine	Norbert Kmiecik	Episode no. 42
2016	Second Chance	Club owner	Episode: "Szansa" (no. 13)
2017	Niania w wielkim mieście	Andrzej Olsza	Episode no. 11
2017–2019	The Chairman's Ear	President Andzej	Recurring role; 33 episodes
2018	Family.pl	Conductor	Episode: "Dwa w jednym" (no. 238)
2018	Trzecia połowa	Client	2 episodes
2019	Barwy szczęścia	Maurycy Szkatułka	3 episodes
2019	The Better Half	Homeless person	Episode no. 6
2019	Na dobre i na złe	Tolek	Episode: "Narodziny chirurga" (no. 756)
2020	Mały zgon	Ponton	3 episodes
2020	Usta usta	Wojtek	2 episodes
2021	Backdoor. Wyjscie awaryjne		7 episodes
2021	Lokatorka	Janusz Rzeźniczak	2 episodes
2021	Raven	Andrzej Kruk	2 episodes
2022	Erynie	Kukla	Episode: "Flegeton" (no. 9)
2022	Father Matthew	Janusz Dobrowolski	Episode: "Złamane serce" (no. 353)
2022	High Water	Kolski	2 episodes
2022	Queen	Ziutek	4 episodes
2022–2023	Swaci	Wacek Gąsior	Main role; 16 episodes
2023	Tylko nie piątek!	Szymon	3 episodes
2023	Zołza	Man	Episode no. 2
2023	Klara	Jan	Episode no. 1
2025	Edukacja XD	Benek Kobielak	2 episodes

=== Audio plays ===
Year	Title	Role
2015	Wampir z Zagłębia	Murderer
2020	Nareszcie możemy być źli	
2020	Osiedle RZNiW	Zabski
2020	Z głową w chmurach, czyli opowieść o Jadwidze Piłsudskiej	

=== Polish-language dubbing ===
Year	Title	Role	Notes
2013–2014	Strange Hill High	Tyson	Television series
2013–2014	Strange Hill High	Additional voices	Television series
