= VH1 (Poland) =

Polish music pay television channel

VH1 Polska/Poland
- Final logo used from September 30, 2015 to March 3, 2020
- Country: Poland
- Headquarters: Warsaw, Poland (primary and technical operations); Camden Town, London (United Kingdom) (secondary operations)

Programming
- Languages: Polish; English
- Picture format: 16:9 (576i SDTV)

Ownership
- Owner: Viacom International Media Networks Polska
- Sister channels: MTV; MTV Music; Comedy Central; Nickelodeon

History
- Launched: 1 December 2005; 20 years ago (original); 24 April 2012; 13 years ago (re-launch)
- Replaced: MTV Classic Poland (2002-2005)
- Closed: 14 January 2011; 15 years ago (original); 3 March 2020; 5 years ago (re-launch)
- Replaced by: Polsat Comedy Central Extra (formerly Comedy Central Family) (original); VH1 Europe (re-launch)

Links
- Website: mtv.pl/vh1

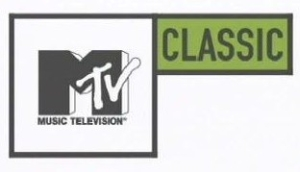
Channel logo under the previous "MTV Classic" name

VH1 Poland was a Polish music pay television channel from ViacomCBS Networks EMEAA that was active from 1 December 2005 to 3 March 2020.

First launched on 1 December 2005 to replace "MTV Classic", another Polish MTV channel which used to broadcast mainly classic videos, VH1 Poland shows almost only music-based programs and plays a much broader range of videos than its predecessor. Many themed music programs were broadcast on a daily or weekly basis. It ceased broadcast on 24 April 2010 and was succeeded on 14 January 2011 by timeshare Comedy Central Family (now Polsat Comedy Central Extra). It relaunched on 24 April 2012, only to shut down again and for the final time on 3 March 2020; it was succeeded first by VH1 Europe until 2 August 2021 and then MTV 00s thereafter.

== History ==
=== As a Polish feed of MTV Classic ===
MTV Classic was a Polish pay television channel which was centered towards airing music videos from the 1960s up to the 1990s. It was launched on 30 May 2002. On 1 December 2005, it was replaced by VH1 Poland.

On 24 April 2010, VH1 Poland ceased to operate as a 24-hour music channel and instead share space with Comedy Central branded channel Comedy Central Family (now Polsat Comedy Central Extra). The new channel lined-up is more skewed towards female audiences.

On April 24, 2012, VH1 Poland started broadcasting again (in 16:9 picture format) replacing VH1 Europe (in Poland).

On September 30, 2015, VH1 Poland began to use the current branding from VH1 Europe and UK. However, the music on those idents were changed, plus, a title of each programme were added at the start of each programme.

=== As a Polish subfeed of VH1 Europe ===
On February 1, 2017 (at 6:00 am CET), the localized Polish feed of VH1 has been merged operations with VH1 Europe from Camden Town, London, United Kingdom, due to the programming change and informing viewers on the upper-left corner showing that Rise And Shine With VH1 will be next after the last programme on the localised Polish feed (100% Music). The last music video to be played on the localised Polish feed is "Can't Hold Us" by Macklemore & Ryan Lewis featuring Ray Dalton at 5:59 am CET. The first music video to be played when the localised Polish feed of VH1 switched its own programming to VH1 Europe's programming is "Million Reasons" by Lady Gaga. While the playlist and the on-air identity (except for the advertising bumpers) has been largely changed, the on-screen graphics are still intact. Unlike the main feed of VH1 Europe (which is commercial-free), the Polish subfeed has advertisements. The channel ended its broadcast on March 3, 2020 at 6:00 am when it was replaced with VH1 Europe.
