= Hoodies Squad =

- Genre: Black comedy Adult animation
- Created by: Bartosz Walaszek
- Showrunner: Bartosz Walaszek
- Voices of: Bartosz Walaszek; Katarzyna Kralewska-Walaszek
- Theme music composer: Bartosz Walaszek; Piotr Połać
- Composers: Bartosz Walaszek; Piotr Połać
- Country of origin: Poland
- Original language: Polish
- No. of seasons: 14
- No. of episodes: 303 (+ 2 special episodes) (Note: As of 7 January 2025)

Production
- Producer: Bartosz Walaszek
- Running time: 4–23 minutes
- Production company: SPInka Film Studio

Original release
- Network: YouTube
- Release: June 10, 2013 – present

Hoodies Squad (Polish: Blok Ekipa) is a Polish adult animated comedy web series created by Bartosz Walaszek and broadcast on his YouTube channel SPInka Film Studio since June 10, 2013, having 303 episodes and 2 specials in total. Since the late 2015, the cartoon is also shown on Comedy Central Poland. Several episodes were also dubbed in Russian as Na Rayonye (На районе, 'In the Hood').

Nearly all characters in the show including the main protagonists are voiced by Bartosz Walaszek himself. Several female voiceovers are done by Katarzyna Krajewska-Walaszek.

== Plot ==
The cartoon tells the story of a group of three lazy hooligans (Polish: dresiarze) from Warsaw – Spejson, Wojtas and Walo. All three are 20–30 years old, originate from poor, lower-class families, live in Warsaw's Grochów subdivision and are fans of Legia. They usually spend their time sitting on benches or in Speluno club, drinking beer and smoking. Because of their rowdy nature, they are at odds with the law and other hooligans.

The show sometimes makes references to, or even features real events and people such as the former Polish President Aleksander Kwaśniewski or to YouTube personalities.
