= No Pressure (2024 film) =

2024 film by Bartosz Prokopowicz

- Polish: Nic na siłę
- Directed by: Bartosz Prokopowicz
- Written by: Karolina Frankowska; Katarzyna Golenia
- Produced by: Marta Klin; Ewa Latkowska
- Starring: Anna Szymańczyk; Anna Seniuk; Mateusz Janicki; Artur Barciś; Angelika Cegielska as Matylda Wasyl; Filip Gurłacz; Cezary Żak; Magdalena Smalara; Paulina Holtz
- Cinematography: Jeremi Prokopowicz
- Edited by: Marcin Kot Bastkowski
- Music by: Jan Sanejko
- Production company: ZPR Media
- Distributed by: Netflix
- Release date: 27 March 2024
- Running time: 111 minutes
- Country: Poland
- Language: Polish

No Pressure (Polish: Nic na siłę) is a 2024 Polish romantic comedy film directed by Bartosz Prokopowicz that was released on Netflix on 27 March 2024.

== Premise ==
A big-city chef in Wrocław is tricked into returning to her hometown in Podlaskie Voivodeship and taking over the family farm.

== Cast ==
- Anna Szymańczyk as Oliwia Madej
- Anna Seniuk as Halina Madej
- Mateusz Janicki as Kuba Wolak
- Artur Barciś as Jan Perzyna
- Filip Gurłacz as Wojtek Kurzak
- Cezary Żak as Adam Wolak
- Paulina Holtz as Wieśka
- Zuzanna Wieleba as Tola Wolak
- Iga Górecka as Kaśka
- Anna Jarosik-Trawińska as Agata
- Angelika Cegielska as Matylda Wasyl
- Magdalena Smalara as Elka
- Paweł Koślik as Romek
- Piotr Rogucki as Zbyszek
- Mateusz Sacharzewski as Damian Wasyl
- Beata Kawka as Maryla
- Franciszka Pietr as Jagoda Wasyl
- Maksymilian Stuchlik as Damian Wasyl Jr.
- Maja Stuchlik as Aldonka Wasyl

== Production ==
The film was shot in Ciechanowiec, Kaniuki, Ciełuszki, Wizna, Suraż, Rutki, and Zabłudów. It was also shot in Wrocław.

== Release ==
The film was released on Netflix on 27 March 2024.
