= WP (Polish TV channel) =

Television channel in Poland

- Country: Poland

Programming
- Language: Polish
- Picture format: 16:9/4:3 576i (SDTV); 1080i (HDTV)

Ownership
- Owner: Wirtualna Polska Holding

History
- Launched: 2 December 2016

Links
- Website: telewizja.wp.tv

Availability

Terrestrial
- Digital terrestrial television: MUX 8 - Channel 41 (SD)

Streaming media
- Pilot WP: https://pilot.wp.pl/tv/#telewizja-wp-hd
- Videostar: http://videostar.pl/tv

WP is a Polish television channel, launched on 2 December 2016. The channel is owned by Wirtualna Polska Holding, owner of one of the largest Polish web portals, Wirtualna Polska.

== Programming ==
=== Own production ===
- #dzieńdobryWP (#goodmorningWP) – current affairs program, hosted by Kamila Biedrzycka-Osica and Małgorzata Serafin
- #dziejesię 16:50 (#it'shappening) – news program, hosted by Maciej Orłoś, Małgorzata Serafin, Marcin Antosiewicz, Michał Siegieda
- Pudelek Show – tabloid magazine, hosted by Małgorzata Tomaszewska and Bilguun Ariunbaatar

=== Series ===
- Orphan Black
- The Fall (Upadek)
- Death in Paradise (Śmierć pod palmami)
- Call the Midwife (Z pamiętnika położnej)
- Parade's End (Koniec defilady)
- Mistresses (Kochanki)
- Scott & Bailey
- Unreal
- The Bridge (Most nad Sundem)
- Catherine (Katarzyna)
- Prisoners of War (Więźniowie wojny)
- Mujeres de negro (Kobiety w czerni)

=== Reality shows ===
- Junior Doctors: Your Life in Their Hands (Młodzi lekarze)
- Love It or List It
