= Beautiful and Unemployed =

2021 Polish comedy television series

- Poster
- Genre: Comedy drama
- Developed by: Robert Górski
- Written by: Robert Górski; Marek Baranowski
- Directed by: Kristoffer Rus; Grzegorz Kuczeriszka
- Starring: Robert Górski; Mikołaj Cieślak; Wojciech Kalarus; Anna Karczmarczyk
- Theme music composer: Robert Górski
- Country of origin: Poland
- Original language: Polish
- No. of seasons: 1
- No. of episodes: 12

Production
- Executive producer: Robert Feluch
- Producers: Dorota Kośmicka-Gacke; Jan Beerend Kepinski
- Cinematography: Grzegorz Kuczeriszka
- Running time: 22 minutes
- Production company: Jake Vision DGA Studio

Original release
- Network: Polsat
- Release: 6 March – 17 April 2021

Beautiful and Unemployed (Polish: Piękni i bezrobotni) is a Polish-language comedy drama television series created by Robert Górski, directed by Kristoffer Rus and Grzegorz Kuczeriszka, and written by Robert Górski and Marek Baranowski. The leading roles were portrayed by Robert Górski and Mikołaj Cieślak. The series was originally aired on Polsat from 6 March to 17 April 2021. It consists of 12 episodes, each lasting 22 minutes.

== Plot ==
Stepbrothers Romek and Gwidon, who reside in Warsaw, Poland, learn that a loan they took in 1989 is ten times larger than they were led to believe. They were deceived and lied to by their childhood friend, and currently a banker, Wiśniewski. Gwidon tries to resolve the issue with the help of state institutions. Romek does not believe they would be able to help, and decides to take matters into his own hands. Unsuccessful in their efforts and with no other options, they decide to work illegally in the informal economy sector to pay off their debt, performing various odd jobs..

== Cast ==
- Robert Górski as Romek
- Mikołaj Cieślak as Gwidon
- Wojciech Kalarus as banker Wiśniewski
- Anna Karczmarczyk as Krysia

== Production ==
Beautiful and Unemployed was created by Robert Górski, directed by Kristoffer Rus and Grzegorz Kuczeriszka, and written by Robert Górski and Marek Baranowski. The production was done by Jake Vision DGA Studio, with Dorota Kośmicka-Gacke and Jan Beerend Kepinski as producers. The cinematography was done by Grzegorz Kuczeriszka. The series was filmed in 2021, in Warsaw, Poland. The lead roles were portrayed by Robert Górski, and Mikołaj Cieślak, with Wojciech Kalarus and Anna Karczmarczyk as two recurring characters. Beautiful and Unemployed premiered on the elevision station Polsat in Poland on 6 March 2021, and its final episode was aired on 17 April 2021. It consists of 12 episodes, each lasting 22 minutes.
