= Comedy Central Poland =

Polish variant of Comedy Central

Comedy Central
- Country: Poland
- Network: Comedy Central
- Headquarters: Warsaw

Programming
- Picture format: 1080i HDTV (downscaled to 16:9 576i for the SDTV feed)

Ownership
- Owner: Paramount Networks EMEAA
- Sister channels: MTV Poland; Polsat Comedy Central Extra

History
- Launched: 19 October 2006; 19 years ago

Links
- Website: comedycentral.pl

Availability

Terrestrial
- Digital terrestrial television/TV Mobilna: Channel 105/14 (SD, pay television)
- Pilot WP: Channel 127/18 (HD, pay television)

Comedy Central is the Polish variant of the eponymous American television channel and the first international Comedy Central channel, having been launched on 19 October 2006.

The 4th channel launched by CBS Networks Television Polish Inc. (at the time known as MTV Networks Europe) in Poland, the channel broadcasts local and imported comedy programming, with the latter including 1980s sitcoms such as The Cosby Show and 2000s series such as Sex and the City.

Since 2008, the channel broadcasts Polish shows like Włatcy móch, 1000 złych uczynków, Camera Café, Kasia i Tomek, Król przedmieścia and the classic show Kariera Nikodema Dyzmy.

On 12 June 2012, Comedy Central Poland and its sister channel Comedy Central Family Poland (now Polsat Comedy Central Extra HD), started broadcasting in the 16:9 widescreen picture format.

== Programming ==
=== Current programming ===
- The Big Bang Theory
- B Positive
- The Black Adder
- Comedy Club
- The Daily Show
- Emigracja XD
- Friends
- Most Ridiculous
- The Office PL
- Pacześ Show
- The Penguins of Madagascar
- South Park
- Two and a Half Men
- Workaholics
- Young Sheldon
- Interstate 60: Episodes of the Road

=== Former programming ===
- 8 Simple Rules
- 30 Rock
- 1000 złych uczynków
- Accidentally on Purpose
- According to Jim
- Arrested Development
- Backdoor - Wyjście awaryjne
- Beavis and Butt-Head
- Better Off Ted
- Bob Hearts Abishola
- Californication
- Call Me Fitz
- Call Me Kat
- Desperate Housewives
- Dharma & Greg
- Drawn Together
- Everybody Hates Chris
- Everybody Loves Raymond
- Family Guy
- Funniest Adverts on the Planet!
- Gary Unmarried
- Hoodies Squad
- How I Met Your Mother
- The IT Crowd
- It's Always Sunny in Philadelphia
- Kasia i Tomek
- Keen Eddie
- Keeping Up Appearances
- The King of Queens
- King of the Hill
- The Knights of Prosperity
- The Middle
- Mike & Molly
- Mom
- My Name Is Earl
- My Wife and Kids
- The New Adventures of Old Christine
- The Office (US)
- Peep Show
- Reno 911!
- Rules of Engagement
- The Sarah Silverman Program
- Saturday Night Live
- Scrubs
- Sex and the City
- Son of the Beach
- SpongeBob SquarePants
- Teachers
- Trailer Park Boys
- Weeds
- Włatcy móch
- Yes, Dear
- Za chwilę dalszy ciąg programu
- Zmiennicy
