= The Chairman's Ear =

Polish web series

- Poster
- Genre: Political satire
- Created by: Robert Górski
- Written by: Robert Górski; Mikołaj Cieślak
- Country of origin: Poland
- Original language: Polish
- No. of seasons: 4
- No. of episodes: 45

Production
- Executive producer: Robert Górski
- Producers: Robert Górski; Mikołaj Cieślak; Izabela Dąbrowska
- Production locations: Warsaw, Poland
- Camera setup: Multi-camera
- Running time: Varies from 9 to 17 minutes

Original release
- Network: YouTube; Showmax; WP
- Release: January 9, 2017 – January 31, 2019

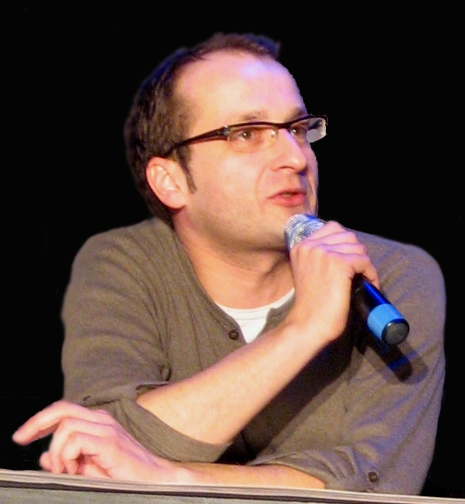
Robert Górski

The Chairman's Ear (Polish: Ucho Prezesa) is a Polish political satire web series broadcast since 9 January 2017 on YouTube, and since 15 February 2017 on Showmax. It was created by Robert Górski, the lead member of the Kabaret Moralnego Niepokoju comedy group.

== Plot ==
The series follows the chairman of the ruling political party in Poland (Mr Chairman). The narrative takes place primarily in his office where, joined by his assistant Mariusz, he hosts numerous visitors, including government officials and other public office holders. While Mr Chairman does not hold any elected office himself, it is clear that key political decisions are made in this office, and not in the Chancellery of the Prime Minister (who herself frequents the office). The plot is deeply rooted in contemporary Polish politics, with each character having a real-life counterpart, with whom they share first names (their surnames are never revealed). The titular character of Mr Chairman is based on Jarosław Kaczyński, the leader of the governing Law and Justice party.

The Chairman's Ear is a continuation of a series of cabaret scenes named Government meeting (Polish: Posiedzenie rządu) in which Robert Górski and other cabaret artists impersonated the members of the Civic Platform and the Polish People's Party.

== Cast ==
Actor	Character	Episodes	Archetype
Robert Górski	Jarosław, Mr Chairman	since 1	Jarosław Kaczyński, chairman of the Law and Justice party
Mikołaj Cieślak	Mariusz	since 1	Mariusz Błaszczak, minister of the interior
Izabela Dąbrowska	Basia, secretary	since 1	Barbara Skrzypek
Paweł Koślik	Andrzej, president of Poland (often called Adrian by other characters)	since 3	Andrzej Duda
Michał Czernecki	Jacek	2, 5, 14	Jacek Kurski, chairman of the public television (TVP)
Robert Majewski		2	Krzysztof Czabański, head of the National Media Council
Wojciech Kalarus	Antoni, minister of war	3, 9	Antoni Macierewicz, minister of national defence
Grzegorz Ciągardlak	Misio, Antoni's assistant	3, 9	Bartłomiej Misiewicz
Sebastian Stankiewicz	Tomasz, Basia's son	4, 10, 12	Marcin Skrzypek
Sebastian Konrad	Mateusz	4	Mateusz Morawiecki, deputy prime minister
Katarzyna Żak	Jola, nurse	5, 14	Jolanta Szczypińska
Agnieszka Wosińska	Beata	5, 14	Beata Mazurek, spokesman for the Law and Justice party
Adam Krawczuk	Adam, PR specialist	5	Adam Bielan
Magdalena Smalara	Ania	6	Anna Zalewska, minister of education
Weronika Wachowska	Monika, Basia's daughter	6, 10	
Łukasz Lewandowski	Marek, Marshal of the Sejm	7	Marek Kuchciński
Jarosław Boberek	Janek, chairman's cousin	7, 14	Jan Maria Tomaszewski
Anna Karczmarczyk	Malwina, Janek's girlfriend	7	Beata Fido
Anna Smołowik	Agata, first lady, Andrzej's wife	8	Agata Kornhauser-Duda
Antonia von Romatowski	Angela	8	Angela Merkel, chancellor of Germany
Magdalena Kacprzak	Krystyna	8	Krystyna Pawłowicz, deputy to the Sejm
Tomasz Drabek	Manfred, Angela's bodyguard	8	
Agnieszka Pilaszewska	Beata, prime minister	9, 14	Beata Szydło
Waldemar Czyszak	Edward, Beata's husband	9	Edward Szydło
Sylwester Maciejewski	Jan	10	Jan Szyszko, minister of the environment
Paweł Tucholski	Father Tadeusz	11	Tadeusz Rydzyk
Ewa Konstancja Bułhak	Beata	11	Beata Kempa, chief of the chancellery of the prime minister
Zbigniew Waleryś	Krzysztof Penderecki	11	Krzysztof Penderecki, composer
Arkadiusz Janiczek	officer of the Government Protection Bureau	11	Tomasz Kędzierski
Roland Nowak	Witold	12	Witold Waszczykowski, minister of foreign affairs
Agata Wątróbska	Małgorzata	12	Małgorzata Wassermann, lawyer, deputy to the Sejm
Robert Górski	Donald from Brussels	12, 14	Donald Tusk, President of the European Council, ex-prime minister
Tomasz Sapryk	Grzegorz	13	Grzegorz Schetyna, chairman of the Civic Platform party
Lesław Żurek	Rysiek	13	Ryszard Petru, chairman of the Modern party
Bartłomiej Magdziarz	Władysław	13	Władysław Kosiniak-Kamysz, chairman of the Polish People's Party
Wojciech Mecwaldowski	Paweł	13	Paweł Kukiz, leader of the Kukiz'15 political movement
Jan Aleksandrowicz	Scyzoryk	13	Liroy, rapper, deputy to the Sejm
Paulina Holtz	Aśka, Rysiek's girlfriend	13	Joanna Schmidt, deputy to the Sejm
	Rysio-Pysio	14	Ryszard Czarnecki, Member of the European Parliament
Przemysław Borkowski	Piłsudski (in Mr Chairman's dream)	14	Józef Piłsudski
Adam Krawczuk	Mussolini (in Mr Chairman's dream)	14	Benito Mussolini
Tomasz Drabek	Goebbels (in Mr Chairman's dream)	14	Joseph Goebbels
Rafał Zbieć	Napoleon (in Mr Chairman's dream)	14	Napoleon
Ryszard Kluge	Gomółka (in Mr Chairman's dream)	14	Władysław Gomułka
Robert Górski	Good Donald	16	Donald Trump
