= Rafał Jonkisz =

Polish model

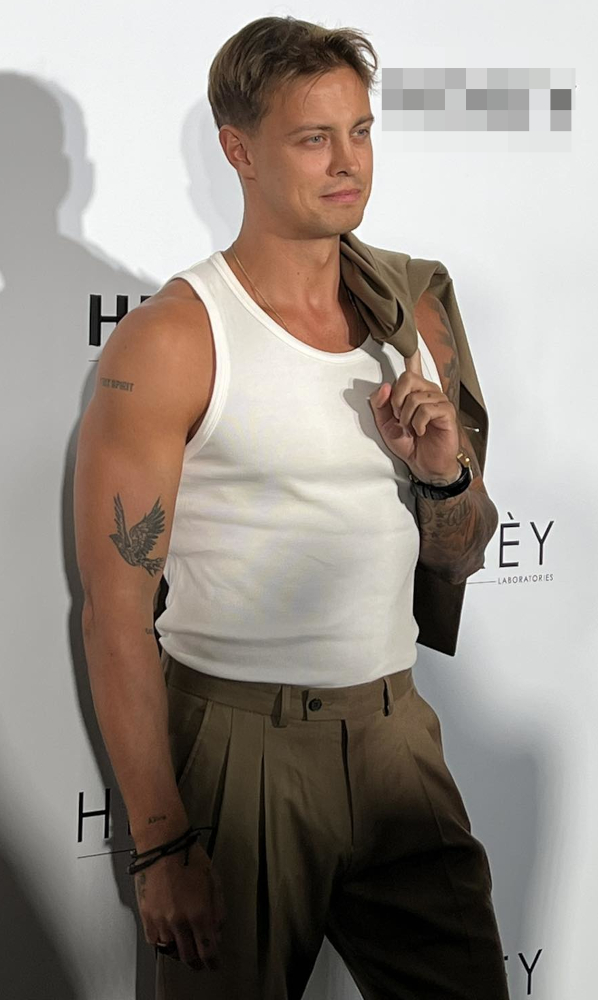
- Jonkisz in 2025
- Born: September 14, 1997 (age 28); Rzeszów, Poland
- Modeling information
- Height: 187cm (6 ft 1 in)
- Hair color: Blond
- Eye color: Blue

Rafał Jonkisz (born 14 September 1997, Rzeszów) is a Polish male fashion model, acrobat and television personality. He holds the title of Mister Poland 2015.

== Life and career ==
He was born on 14 September in 1997 in Rzeszów. In 2016, he graduated from the Krzysztof Kamil Baczyński High School No. 5 in Rzeszów. In 2018, he began to study at the University of Ecology and Management in Warsaw.

He took up acrobatics at the age of 13 and his first coach was Jolanta Brudny. In 2014, he performed at the opening ceremony of the 2014 FIVB Volleyball Men's World Championship held in Warsaw. He was the runner-up at the 2014 World Show Dance Championships. The same year, he participated together with Sebastian Kamiński in the 7th edition of Mam talent! TV talent show. In 2015, he formed the FlyBoys acrobatics group with Kamil Knut and Norbert Hawryluk. In December, he won the title of Mister Poland 2015. He represented Poland at the Mister World 2016. He finished in the TOP 10 and won the Talent and Creativity Challenge as well as claimed 2nd place in the MobStar People's Choice.

He took part in various entertainment shows including Dancing with the Stars: Taniec z gwiazdami (2016), Agent (2019) and Ninja Warrior Poland. In 2020, he will be appearing on the second edition of the Polish version of Dance, Dance, Dance.

In 2019, he and Sebastian Chłodnicki launched a new clothing brand Balmora.

== Personal life ==
Rafal has three siblings: elder sister Sylwia, younger sister Magda and younger brother Krzysztof. His father died when he was 13 and the whole family was left under the sole care of mother Renata. He was in a relationship with Polish fashion model Marcelina Zawadzka. He has publicly expressed his support for LGBT rights.

== See also ==
- Male modeling
- List of Poles
