= Włatcy móch =

- First row from the left: Anusiak, Konieczko, Maślana and Czesio. Second row: Mrs. Nurse and Ms. Frał
- Genre: Animated sitcom Black comedy Satire Surreal humor
- Created by: Bartosz Kędzierski
- Showrunners: Paweł Pewny; Michał Dusiński; Jarosław Ratajski
- Directed by: Bartosz Kędzierski; Błażej Andrzejewski
- Voices of: Krzysztof Kulesza; Adam Cywka; Bartosz Kędzierski; Krzysztof Grębski; Beata Rakowska; Elżbieta Golińska
- Theme music composer: Behavior
- Country of origin: Poland
- No. of seasons: 9
- No. of episodes: 127 + 2 specials + 1 feature film (list of episodes)

Production
- Running time: approx. 22 minutes
- Production companies: RMG, Xantus

Original release
- Network: TV4
- Release: 14 November 2006 – 4 December 2011

Włatcy móch (Polish pronunciation: [ˈvwatsˑɨ mux]) (English: The Lordz o' Flys) is a Polish adult animated sitcom, which aired on the Polish TV channel TV4 between November 2006 and December 2011. The title is a misspelling of "Władcy much" ("The Lords of Flies") and derives from William Golding's novel Lord of the Flies. The story revolves around four 8-year-old boys in Grade IIB of the Zośka Battalion Primary School in Wrocław: Anusiak, Konieczko, Maślana and Czesio. The show has a total of 127 regular and 2 special episodes, and a feature film also exists. The comedy won the 2008 Świry Award in category "TV Series".

It is often compared to South Park, to such an extent that the show has even been nicknamed the "Polish South Park".

From 2017 to 2019 a sequel series named Włatcy móch: One (Lordz o' Flys: Them) was produced, but the premiere of the show took place on 8th of September 2024.

== Main characters ==
- Czesio – A zombie. He lives with two of his friends, Marcel and The Colonel, and has a teddy bear – Sweary. He wants to become a singer of Gorzkie żale (in Czesio's meaning, old, sad Church chants). Czesio had such serious and numerous developmental and genetic disabilities before death, that it was only after he died that he was able to function normally. He doesn't know that he's a zombie and that because of that he is physically unable to grow up. He's extremely polite and kind, but also very naïve. He can eat anything without harm, without limits in quantity. His IQ was estimated at 70.
- Anusiak – (in the episode "Nazywam się Anusiak", he's also called Odbyciak – odbyt is Polish for anus). He always sniffs his hand after the end of most of his sentences because of allergies. His father is a member of a peasant political party (probably Samoobrona) and is a Sejm member – which is reflected in Anusiak's political aspirations. He wants to create a large populist party that would one day rule the world, with himself as the leader. Due to his fathers' example, he is skilled at writing and delivering appealing (populist) speeches. He always receives socks as his Christmas present. His IQ was estimated at 50.
- Maślana – (Buttermilk) sometimes called Moczowód (Polish for ureter) the richest and most cunning and sneaky of the group. He wants to be the President of the World Bank. He wore a diaper in the episode Mokre Sny ("Wet Dreams"). On his 8th birthday, his wealthy parents gave him a golden credit card. His top rated value is money, but he is also quite religious at the same time, and is very afraid of Satan. His IQ was estimated at 130.
- Konieczko – (Necessary) a genius, similar to Dexter. He likes to experiment on animals, especially using explosives. He claims to be an atheist. He wants to become the President of the Nobel Foundation. His IQ was estimated 153 - the highest in his class. He is confirmed to have ADHD.
- Ms. Frał – (from German: die Frau, meaning woman, lady). Also called "the old bag" or "Gal/Dudette" by the main four. She is the teacher of class IIB, the class with the four boys. She is an old spinster and is still a virgin. Religiously devoted (in a very old-fashioned sense), she is very demanding and does not like the main characters, and does not refrain from insulting them frequently. She speaks with an Eastern Polish accent.
- Mrs. Nurse – a corpulent school nurse with a deep, masculine voice. After the death of Marcel, her husband, she becomes interested in blues. Aside from blues, she is also interested and prolific in practically every genre of music. She enjoys the reggae culture and smokes marijuana at times. In the episode Za Kólisami ("Behind the Scenes"), it is revealed she has an underage Asian lover.

== Other characters ==
- Andżelika – is a classmate of the main characters. She comes from the USA. She is 3 years older than the other students, but attends the same class due to educational differences between Poland and the US. The boys don't like her mutually. In the episode Andżelika, she was going out with Anusiak, Konieczko, and Maślana all at once, only to dump them the next day to go after Czesio. However, Czesio didn't like her because she doesn't have a penis. Her IQ was estimated 140. Her father is from Texas. She often uses English words along with Polish.
- Karolina – Andżelika's best friend.
- Marcel – an alcoholic zombie, former husband to Mrs. Nurse. He committed suicide by jumping from a bridge, and therefore can't get into heaven. He lives at the cemetery and is Czesio's neighbor and friend. He likes to spend his time with The Colonel by drinking beer and vodka brought to the cemetery by his wife, whom he told to do so instead of bringing flowers. Marcel often acts as Czesio's dad on parents' evenings.
- The Colonel – also a zombie, but with his upper skeleton and skull visible. He lives at the cemetery near Marcel, and is another one of Czesio's friends. He fought in the Home Army and according to other information, in Józef Piłsudski's legion during World War I. He is known for his strong anticommunist views and dislike toward police. Some of his friends, fellow zombie Home Army veterans, are still living in the underground since the Warsaw uprising, where he visits them. Like Marcel, Colonel is an alcoholic and they often drink together. He often breaks into the graves of fallen Russians to get vodka. The Colonel often acts as Czesio's mum on parents' evenings.
- Sweary the Bear – Czesio's brown teddy filled with sawdust, leader of the plushies. Sweary is alive and swears a lot. He also helps Czesio when he is in trouble, along with the rest of the gang. He is also a drinkmate of Marcel and The Colonel, but does not drink too much because of his sawdust filling soaking through. Sweary is the only character in the show to be animated in 3D.
- The Homeless – sleeps rough and collects garbage. He mumbles a lot and never speaks intelligibly.
- The Bus Driver – a Satanist. He performs black Sabbaths at the cemetery. His IQ was estimated 66.6, which upset Anusiak, because his IQ is even lower.
- The Priest – allergic to caffeine. He is a dead ringer for Tadeusz Rydzyk.
- The Nun – a religious education teacher. She looks, sounds and behaves exactly like Miss Frał, except she has a different accent.
- Mariola Wasilak – a TV journalist, who has won an Oscar for a report on Polish children at an annual potato lifting contest.
- Rambo – Maślana's dog, appears only in Episode 34.
- Zajkowski – the main characters' classmate. He often visits the ladies room because the main characters hate him and often bully him (especially Anusiak). He has fallen in love with Andżelika. Anusiak always beats him up, and in one of the episodes, Konieczko killed him. His IQ was estimated 100.
- Pikulski and Frosik – are from sixth grade and they are around 4 years older than the main characters. They are school gangsters and the main characters are very afraid of them. In a few episodes, the duo is always doing something mischievous to the main characters, such as stealing their property, or hitting them for fun. Surprisingly, Mrs. Nurse also hates them because she knows they are doing harm to other pupils and she will always help the main characters if Pikulski or Frosik have done anything wrong to them.
- Pedeciak – Konieczko's tan teddy with buttons in place of his eyes. Unlike his owner, he is not very intelligent.
- Toothy – Maślana's teddy, wearing a blue-grey-red sweatshirt and a baseball cap. He has a single tooth going out of his mouth.
- Huggy – Anusiak's pink plush rabbit. He is the most infantile of the four plushies and wants to hug everyone, which annoys Sweary a lot.

== List of episodes (translations without mistakes) ==
Air Date	N/o	English Title	Original Title
FIRST SEASON
14.11.2006	01	Maślana's card	Karta Maślany
15.11.2006	02	My Name is Anusiak	Nazywam się Anusiak
21.11.2006	03	Order for Maślana	Order dla Maślany
22.11.2006	04	Uncle Alfred	Wójek Alfred
28.11.2006	05	First Communion	Piersza komunja
29.11.2006	06	Andżelika	Andżelika
06.12.2006	07	Shigella the Witch	Wiedźma Shigella
12.12.2006	08	Hygienic Blues	Higieniczny blues
13.12.2006	09	Brainwashing	Pranie mózgów
19.12.2006	10	Milk skin, Milkwoman, and the Frog Plug	Korzóh, mleczarka i korek do rzaby
07.03.2007	11	The Bus and the Souvenir	Ałtobus i suwenira
14.03.2007	12	The Museum	Muzełum
SECOND SEASON
21.03.2007	13	Saint Nicholas Day	Mikołajki
28.03.2007	14	Potato Lifting	Wykopki
04.04.2007	15	Carnival	Karnawau
23.12.2007	16	Romek and his Fred	Romek i jego Fred
11.04.2007	17	Full Control	Maksymalna kontrola
18.04.2007	18	Grandma's Radio	Radyjko Babci
25.04.2007	19	Boróh the Scout	Druch Boróh
02.05.2007	20	Barbecue with Mruczuś	Barbakiu z Mruczusiem
09.05.2007	21	The Swearing Bear	Miś Przekliniak
17.05.2007	22	Behind the Scenes	Za kólisami
23.05.2007	23	Positive Vibration	Pozytywna wibracja
31.05.2007	24	Memento Mori	Memęto Mori
THIRD SEASON
02.09.2007	25	Cavities	Próhnica
09.09.2007	26	Czesław's Case	Pszypadek Czesława
16.09.2007	27	The World Cup	Móndial
23.09.2007	28	TV's Truth	Prawda ekranu
30.09.2007	29	The Motorbike and Mouseguts	Motorynka i myszykiszki
07.10.2007	30	Fluder	Fluder
14.10.2007	31	Shaggy Democracy	Kosmata Demokrancja
21.10.2007	32	A Run Away	Gigant
04.11.2007	33	Exhumation	Ekskumancja
11.11.2007	34	Czech, Cześ and Brambor	Czech, Cześ i Brambor
18.11.2007	35	The Anxious Rains	Deszcze niespokojne
25.11.2007	36	Vaccine for Frycek	Szczypionka dla Frycka
02.12.2007	37	Washy-Wash	Kompu-kompu
09.12.2007	38	Purée for the Elephant	Piure dla słonia
19.12.2007	39	Nativity Play	Jasełki
FOURTH SEASON
02.03.2008	40	The Parade	Pochót
09.03.2008	41	Bogey	Mel
16.03.2008	42	Sleigh Ride with Próch	Kólik z Próchem
23.03.2008	43	Bloody Tuesday	Krfawy wtorek
30.03.2008	44	Gangster's Paradise	Gangsta-Dewasta
06.04.2008	45	Bee and Class Math Test	Pździoszczoła i test z majzy
13.04.2008	46	Wet Dreams	Mokre sny
20.04.2008	47	Wet Dreams	Mokre sny
27.04.2008	48	The Sandcastles	Bapki z piahu
04.05.2008	49	Bruce Lee's Style	Styl Brusliego
11.05.2008	50	Power of Wild Monkeys	Moc Dzikih Małp
18.05.2008	51	Canal	Kanau
07.09.2008	52	Execution	Egzekócja
14.09.2008	53	The Vending Machine	Ałtomat
21.09.2008	54	Biological Weapon	Broń Bjologiczna
FIFTH SEASON
28.09.2008	55	Children's Day	Dzjeń dzjecka
05.10.2008	56	Death and Candy	Śmiercicha i cóksy
12.10.2008	57	Boys or Machos?	Chłopacy czy maczo?
19.10.2008	58	The Science Contest	Olimiada nałukowa
26.10.2008	59	The Secret Samurai Blade	Tajne Oszcze Samuraja
02.11.2008	60	Green Hallucination	Zieluna Haluna
09.11.2008	61	Boys - Firemen	Hłopaki Strażaki
16.11.2008	62	Introduction of Euro	Wprowadzenie Jełro
23.11.2008	63	Building, Pie, and Gun	Bódowa, Placek i Splówa
30.11.2008	64	Master of Paper Recycling	Miszczu Makratury
07.11.2008	65	The Fair	Festyn
14.12.2008	66	The Country	Wioha
SIXTH SEASON
01.03.2009	67	Affection	Óczucie wyszcze
08.03.2009	68	Zajjo's revenge	Zemsta Zajjo
15.03.2009	69	The Night of the Living Dead	Noc rzywyh trupóf
22.03.2009	70	Divine Hello	Boże Halo
29.03.2009	71	The Curve of Life	Kreha Rzycia
05.04.2009	72	The Hearing	Pszesóhanie
19.04.2009	73	The Black PR of Paparazzi	Czarny pijar paparaczi
26.04.2009	74	Stark Circus	Jistny Cyrk
03.05.2009	75	The Athletics	Letkoatletyka
10.05.2009	76	Houston, oh Damn!	Chjóston, ja pierdziu!
17.05.2009	77	Class Christmas Eve	Klasowa Wiligila
24.05.2009	78	The Visitation	Wizytancja
31.05.2009	79	Yellow T-shirt and a Screwdriver	Rzułta koszulka i śrubowkręt
SEVENTH SEASON
06.09.2009	80	Chickenpox	Łospa wieczna
13.09.2009	81	The Awkward Hero	Żenadera bochatera
20.09.2009	82	Winter in the City	Zima w Mieśdzie
27.09.2009	83	The Ice Rink	Lodowiho
04.10.2009	84	The Book Is My Friend	Ksionszka moim pszyjacielem
11.10.2009	85	The Magical Powers	Magiczne moce
18.10.2009	86	Screwed	Ódópieni
25.10.2009	87	The Boys Are Defending The Playground	Chłopacy placu broniom
01.11.2009	88	The Automotive Miracle	Cód motoryzancji
08.11.2009	89	The Pedaling	Pedałuwa
15.11.2009	90	The Barefoot Mother Mary	Matka bosa
22.11.2009	91	The Burped Prohibition	Bekana Prohibincja
29.11.2009	92	The Cruise	Reis
06.12.2009	93	No Urine at All	Ani Siór Siór
13.12.2009	94	Damn	Kurde
20.12.2009	95	The Penance	Pokóta
EIGHTH SEASON
28.02.2010	96	The Pet	Zwieżontko
07.03.2010	97	Infected Meat	Hore Mięho
14.03.2010	98	I Am Not A Digit	Nie jestem cyfrom
21.03.2010	99	A Little Top	Bonczek
30.03.2010	100	WWW Monkey at the Zoo	WU WU WU Maupa w zoo
25.04.2010	101	Change of the Guard	Zmiana Warty
02.05.2010	102	Re-socialization Right Now	Resocjalizancja jusz
09.05.2010	103	Sugar Builds Up	Cókier krzepi
16.05.2010	104	Storks' Key	Klócz bocianuf
23.05.2010	105	Female Element	Rzeński pierwiosnek
30.05.2010	106	Knockout	Nokałt
06.06.2010	107	The Nail for the Coffin	Gwuść do trómny
13.06.2010	108	From Hell	Spiekua rodem
20.06.2010	109	A Small Mouse	Małamysza
NINTH SEASON
08.05.2011	110	Wet Job	Mokra robota
15.05.2011	111	Iron Wheel	Rzelazna kjerownica
22.05.2011	112	A Red Button	Czerwony gózik
29.05.2011	113	Ants' Hardship	Mrófczy trut
05.06.2011	114	Farmageddon	Farmagedon
12.06.2011	115	A Choir of Uncles	Hur wójuf
19.06.2011	116	At the Source	Ó źródła
26.06.2011	117	Black Boy Bambo	Móżynek Bambo
30.10.2011	118	A Timely Receipt	Paragon Czasowy
06.11.2011	119	The Duty	Dyrzór
06.11.2011	120	My Dad	Muj Tata
13.11.2011	121	A Hydro Maze	Chydro za gatka
13.11.2011	122	Come, I'll Show You Post Stamps	Choć, pokarzem Ci znaczki
20.11.2011	123	The Fiction of Life	Fikcja życia
20.11.2011	124	Do You Speak English?	Du ju spik inglisz
27.11.2011	125	A Safety Lever	Wajha bespieczeństfa
27.11.2011	126	The School Savings Cashbox, A Marker, and the Haunted House	SKO, flamaster i dom strachów
04.12.2011	127	Pilot's Day	Dzień lotnika
WŁATCY MÓCH: ONE
08.09.2024	1 (128)	A new life	Nowe rzycie
08.09.2024	2 (129)	Music	Mózyka
15.09.2024	3 (130)	A spot	Miejscufka
15.09.2024	4 (131)	Heart in darkness/Testicle in darkness	Jondro w ciemności
27.09.2024	5 (132)	Miss Jola - Birth of a feeling	Pani Jola – Narodziny óczócia
2.09.2024	6 (133)	Miss Jola - Weird feeling	Pani Jola - Dziwne uczucie
29.09.2024	7 (134)	Crappy Halloween	Dziadoskie Halołin
29.09.2024	8 (135)	Life in a family	Rzycie w rodzinie
04.10.2024	9 (136)	Winter is coming	Winter jest komin
04.10.2024	10 (137)	Zajkowski family	Zajkowscy

Interesting sections of Lordz o' Flys

- The 32nd episode's title "Gigant" is ambiguous. Though the semantic meaning is simply "a giant", the term has an associative meaning in Polish slang wherein it signifies "a run-away". It is the latter that is most likely the intended meaning of the authors.
- The 66th episode's title is "Wioha" - it is a pejorative term for "village".
- The 76th episode's title is "Chjóston, ja pierdziu"; Chjóston does mean Houston, and "ja pierdziu" is milder form from "ja pierdole" (oh fuck!)
- The 90th episode's title - "Matka bosa" - is a pun on "Matka Boska" - Mother of God.
- In the 105 episode's title, the word "pierwiosnek" can be read as primrose, but it is also a pun from the word "pierwiastek" - element.

== Pronunciation ==
Many of the titles have intentional spelling mistakes in the Polish original, as Czesio is the narrator and has a tendency to misspell words. Though these are mostly there for comedic effect, they do expose some interesting redundancies in the Polish spelling system, which is riddled with traditional forms of spelling that no longer have a phonological basis. One should keep in mind that despite the fact the shows spellings are regarded as incorrect by language purists, they often reflect the actual pronunciation of the words in question. Some examples include:

"Próhnica" instead of "Próchnica" (meaning "tooth decay") etc. The digraph "ch" represents a voiceless velar fricative whereas the graph "h" is an obsolete spelling from Old Polish that used to stand for a voiced glottal fricative; today, this form of pronunciation is present only is certain dialects of Polish, most notably the dialect of Podhale.

"Móch" instead of "Much" (which is the plural, genitive of "mucha", meaning "fly"). In Polish there are two graphemes that realise the close back rounded vowel phoneme; this is a remnant from Old Polish phonology, where the diacritic-o (ó) was used to express a long close mid rounded vowel. Today this spelling variation is obsolete.

Additionally, several spelling mistakes arise from devoicing, such as "krfawy" instead of "krwawy", or allophonic processes, as in "ałtobus" instead of "autobus"("ł" is presently pronounced as a glide vowel, similar to the English "w", though until the end of World War II it used to be a velarised alveolar liquid, or so called "dark-l"; this is still audible in various Polish black and white films from that time, during which the English "belt" and Polish "bełt", meaning "crossbow bolt", would be pronounced all but identically).

Most misspellings arise from true pronunciation, but some derive from hypercorrection, such as: "Memęto Mori" for "Memento mori".

== Feature film ==
Włatcy móch: Ćmoki, czopki i mondzioły – a 2009 animated feature-length movie

== Włatcy Móch: One ==
From 2018, information about the return of the series began to appear. In March 2018, TV4 on its 18th birthday made a promotional spot in which Czesio appears with Przekliniak. On January 4, 2019, the official website of the series was created on Facebook. On January 14, 2019, a music video with the characters of the series entitled: "Włatcy Móch: One – Dojrzywanie" appeared on the YouTube channel of Polsat. In August 2019, the 18th episode of the new series was leaked to the internet which had already been deleted, accidentally appeared on the internet. At the end of March 2020. TV4 on the occasion of its 20th birthday launched a special spot. The spot contained roadside advertisements presenting the channel's shows and programming. At the 00:19 mark, there is a picture of Czesio with the words "Włatcy móch One WIELKI POWRÓT NIEDZIELA 20:00" ("Włatcy móch One BIG RETURN, SUNDAY 20:00") and the station's logo, and at 00:42 on the right hand side building, there is a caricature of Czesio.

On July 1st, 2024, on the official TV4's Facebook page, the premiere date of Włatcy Móch: One was announced as September 8, 2024. and it took place on the said day with two episodes: Nowe Rzycie (A new life) and Mózyka (Music).

== Prizes ==
Year	Ceremony	Category	Result
2008	Festiwal Dobrego Humoru	TV series	Special Prize
2008	Świry	TV series	Won
2009	Świry	TV series	Won
