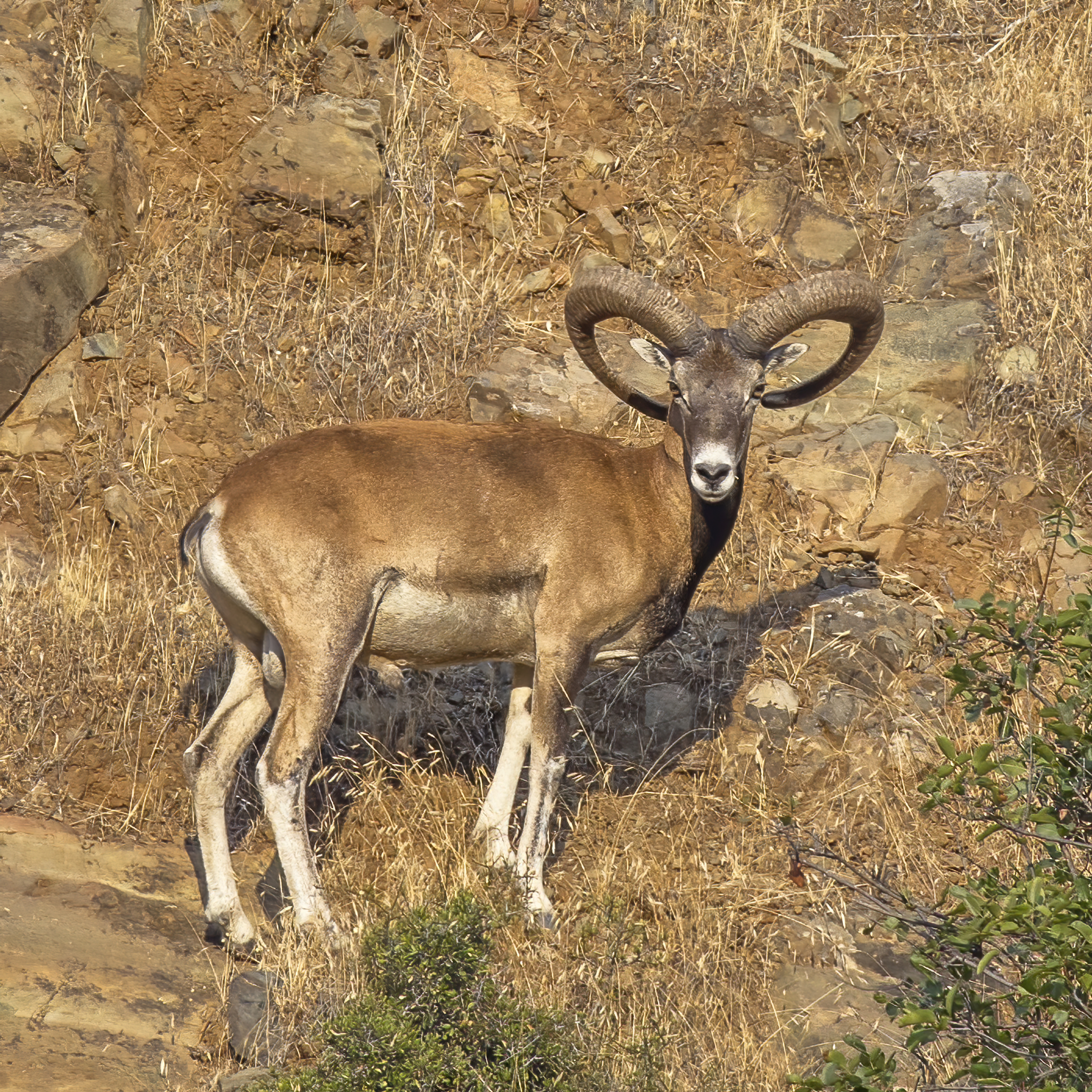
- Male Cyprus mouflon (Ovis gmelini ophion)

Conservation status
- Near Threatened (IUCN 3.1)
- CITES Appendix I

Scientific classification
- Kingdom: Animalia
- Phylum: Chordata
- Class: Mammalia
- Order: Artiodactyla
- Family: Bovidae
- Subfamily: Caprinae
- Genus: Ovis
- Species: O. gmelini

Binomial name
- Ovis gmelini Blyth, 1841
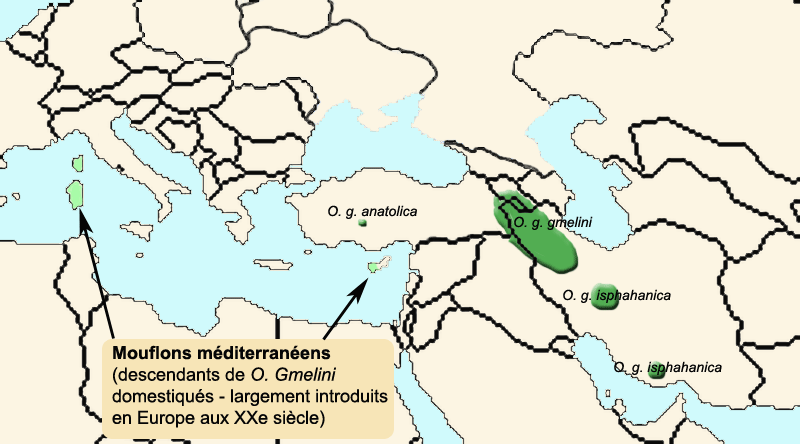
- Range of the Ovis gmelini

= Mouflon =

Species group of the wild sheep

The mouflon (Ovis gmelini) or moufflon is a wild sheep native to Cyprus, Armenia, Azerbaijan, Georgia, Iran, and two separate parts of Turkey. Thought to be the ancestor of all modern domestic sheep breeds, this wild sheep can also be found in parts of Europe, particularly in Mediterranean islands.

== Taxonomy ==
Ovis gmelini was the scientific name proposed by Edward Blyth in 1841 for wild sheep in the high mountains of Armenia and Iran. In the 19th and 20th centuries, several wild sheep were described that are considered mouflon subspecies today:

- Ovis ophion by Blyth in 1841 for wild sheep in Cyprus;
- Ovis laristanica by Nikolai Nasonov in 1909 for wild sheep in Lar in southern Iran;
- Ovis orientalis isphahanica by Nasonov in 1910 for wild sheep in the Zagros Mountains.

== Subspecies ==
Five mouflon subspecies are distinguished by MSW3, from west to east:

- Anatolian mouflon, O. g. anatolica (Arıhan, 2000), also called ceren once almost extinct population of mouflon that is slowly coming back. Core population lives in the region of Konya, and has been reintroduced to Ankara, Eskişehir, Afyonkarahisar, Karaman, Kahramanmaraş and Kırşehir in its former range. Total population is about 800.
- Cyprus mouflon, O. g. ophion (Blyth, 1841): also called agrino (from the Greek Αγρινό); nearly driven to extinction during the 20th century. In 1997, about 1,200 individuals were counted. The television show Born to Explore with Richard Wiese reported 3,000 individuals on Cyprus.
- Armenian mouflon (Armenian red sheep), O. g. gmelini (Blyth, 1851): nominate subspecies; native to easternmost Turkey, northwestern Iran, Armenia, and Azerbaijan. It has been introduced to Texas in the U.S.
- Esfahan mouflon, O. g. isphahanica (Nasonov, 1910): Zagros Mountains, Iran.
- Laristan mouflon, O. g. laristanica (Nasonov, 1909): a small subspecies, its range is restricted to some desert reserves near Lar in southern Iran.

The European mouflon was once thought to be a subspecies of the mouflon, but is now considered to be a feral descendant of the domestic sheep (Ovis aries), as Ovis aries musimon.

== Relation to other sheep ==
Based on comparison of mitochondrial cytochrome b gene sequences, three groups of sheep (Ovis) have been identified: Pachyceriforms of Siberia (snow sheep) and North America (bighorn and Dall sheep), Argaliforms (argali) of Central Asia, and Moufloniforms (urial, mouflon, and domestic sheep) of Eurasia. However, a comparison of the mitochondrial DNA control region (CR) found that two subspecies of urial, Ovis vignei (or orientalis) arkal and O. v./o. bochariensis, grouped with two different clades of argali (Ovis ammon).

The ancestral sheep is presumed to have had 60 chromosomes, as in goats (Capra). Mouflon and domestic sheep have 54 chromosomes, with three pairs (1+3, 2+8, 5+11) of ancestral acrocentric chromosomes joined to form bi-armed chromosomes. This is in contrast to the argali and urial, which have 56 and 58 chromosomes respectively. If the urial is as closely related to the mouflons as mitochondrial DNA indicates, then two chromosomes would need to have split during its evolution away from the mouflon (sub)species.

== Description ==
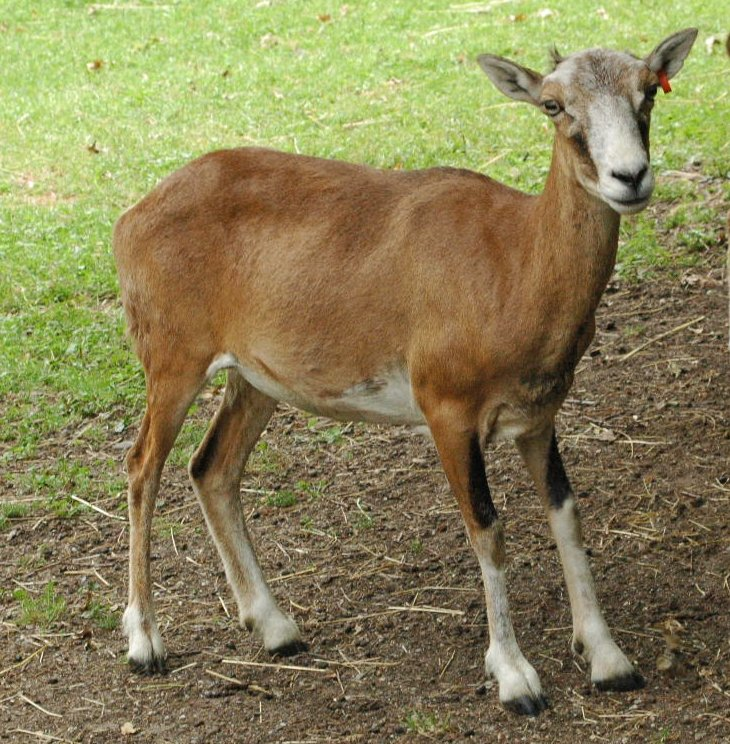
Mouflon female

Mouflon have reddish to dark brown, short-haired coats with dark back stripes and black ventral areas and light-colored saddle patches. The males are horned; some females are horned, while others are polled. The horns of mature rams are curved almost one full revolution (up to 85 cm). Mouflon have shoulder heights of around 0.9 m and body weights of 50 kg (males) and 35 kg (females).

== Distribution and habitat ==
During the late Pleistocene mouflon ranged from central Turkey to northern Syria northern Iraq, up to Armenia, Azerbaijan and western Iran, roughly corresponding to the Fertile Crescent.

Their typical habitat is gently rolling hills in the steppe-forest ecotone.

== Behaviour and ecology ==
=== Reproduction ===
Mouflon rams have a strict dominance hierarchy. Before mating season or "rut", which is from late autumn to early winter, rams try to create a dominance hierarchy to determine access to ewes (female mouflon) for mating. Mouflon rams fight one another to obtain dominance and win an opportunity to mate with females. Mouflons reach sexual maturity at the age of two to four years. Young rams need to obtain dominance before they get a chance to mate, which takes another three years. Mouflon ewes also go through a similar hierarchy process in terms of social status in the first two years, but can breed even at low status. Pregnancy in females lasts five months, in which they produce one to two offspring.

A mouflon was cloned successfully in early 2001, and lived at least seven months, making it the first clone of an endangered mammal to survive beyond infancy. This demonstrated that a common species (in this case, a domestic sheep) can successfully become a surrogate for the birth of an exotic animal such as the mouflon. If cloning of the mouflon can proceed successfully, it has the potential to reduce strain on the number of living specimens.

== Conservation ==
The mouflon is protected in Armenia and Azerbaijan. In Turkey and Iran, hunting is only allowed with a special license. The population in Cyprus is listed as a strictly protected species in the Habitats Directive of the European Union and has been listed in CITES Appendix I since November 2019.

== In culture ==
In Cyprus, where the local version was almost extinct by the early 1950s, the mouflon is the country's national animal, and the symbol of the Cyprus national rugby union team, whose players are affectionately called "The Wild Mouflons." The mouflon was the logo of Cyprus Airways until 2015, and is depicted on the 1-, 2-, and 5-cent Cypriot euro coins.

Elsewhere in the Mediterranean Sea, the male mouflon is called Mufro in Corsica, and the female Mufra, while the French naturalist Georges-Louis Leclerc, Comte de Buffon (1707–1788) rendered this in French as moufflon. In Sardinia, the male is called Murvoni, and the female Murva, though it is not unusual to hear the locals style both indiscriminately as Mufion, a corruption of the Greek Ophion.

The mouflon, hunted by Armenia's Kalavan inhabitants for centuries,, and now an endangered subpecies, is featured as a prominent heraldic symbol on tombstones.

Craghoppers, the UK outdoor clothing manufacturer, has adopted since 1996 the mouflon, which bounces "from crag to crag," as its brand mascot.

== See also ==
- Castlemilk Moorit
- Urial
- Muflon (rapper)
