= Cierpięta =

Cierpięta may refer to the following places:

- Cierpięta, Ostrołęka County in Masovian Voivodeship (east-central Poland)
- Cierpięta, Węgrów County in Masovian Voivodeship (east-central Poland)
- Cierpięta, Pomeranian Voivodeship (north Poland)
