= Majki =

Majki may refer to the following places:

- Majki, Ostrołęka County in Masovian Voivodeship (east-central Poland)
- Majki, Sierpc County in Masovian Voivodeship (east-central Poland)
- Majki, Warmian-Masurian Voivodeship (north Poland)
