= Linki =

Linki may refer to the following places in Poland:

- Linki, Pomeranian Voivodeship
- Linki, Warmian-Masurian Voivodeship
