= Bakula =

Bakula or Bakuła (Polish pronunciation: [baˈkuwa]) is a surname. Polish one: from nickname "talker, babbler". Notable people with the name include:

- 19th Kushok Bakula Rinpoche, a buddhist monk
- Andrea Bakula (born 1981), Croatian table tennis player
- Hanna Bakuła (born 1950), Polish painter, scenographer, and columnist
- Kushok Bakula Rinpoche, a buddhist monk
- Marijan Bakula (born 1966), Bosnian football player
- Scott Bakula (born 1954), American actor
- Zvonko Bakula (born 1982), Bosnian footballer

== See also ==
- Bakuła, village in Poland
