= Balewo =

Balewo refers to the following places in Poland:

- Balewo, Pomeranian Voivodeship
- Balewo, Warmian-Masurian Voivodeship
