= Rupin =

Rupin may refer to:

== Places ==
- Rupin, Maków County, Masovian Voivodeship, Poland
- Rupin, Ostrołęka County, Masovian Voivodeship, Poland
- Rupin, Podlaskie Voivodeship, Poland

== People ==
- Ernest Rupin (1845–1909), French antiquarian, naturalist and speleologist
- Jury Rupin (1946–2008), Ukrainian photographer
- Pacôme Rupin (born 1985), French politician

== See also ==
- Ruppin (disambiguation)
