= 1670 (TV series) =

Polish satirical comedy television series

- Polish Netflix poster
- Genre: Mockumentary; Satirical comedy
- Written by: Jakub Rużyłło
- Directed by: Maciej Buchwald; Kordian Kądziela
- Starring: Bartłomiej Topa; Katarzyna Herman; Martyna Byczkowska; Michał Sikorski; Michał Balicki; Andrzej Kłak; Dobromir Dymecki; Kirył Pietruczuk; Filip Zaręba
- Country of origin: Poland
- Original language: Polish
- No. of seasons: 3
- No. of episodes: 24

Production
- Producers: Ivo Krankowski; Jan Kwieciński
- Cinematography: Nils Croné
- Editors: Albert Bana; Magdalena Chowańska; Anna Luka; Sebastian Mialik
- Running time: 29–44 minutes
- Production company: Akson Studio

Original release
- Network: Netflix
- Release: 13 December 2023 – present

1670 is a Polish mockumentary satirical comedy television series. It premiered on Netflix on 13 December 2023. The third season premiered on 5 August 2026.

== Premise ==
The series follows the pursuits of Jan Paweł Adamczewski, the head of a szlachta noble family in the Polish–Lithuanian Commonwealth during the late 17th century. In the pilot episode, Jan Paweł states that his main goal is to become "the most famous John Paul in Polish history."

== Cast ==
- Bartłomiej Topa as Jan Paweł Adamczewski, a Sarmatian nobleman and part owner of the village of Adamczycha
- Katarzyna Herman as Zofia, Jan Paweł's wife, a religious fanatic
- Martyna Byczkowska as Aniela, Jan Paweł's rebellious and progressive daughter
- Michał Sikorski as Jakub, Jan Paweł's younger son, a business-minded priest and cynic
- Michał Balicki (season 1) and Filip Zaręba (season 2–present) as Stanisław, Jan Paweł's older son and heir of the family estate
- Andrzej Kłak as Andrzej, part owner of the village of Adamczycha and Jan Paweł's enemy
- Dobromir Dymecki as Bogdan, Zofia's brother, a hussar
- Kirył Pietruczuk as Maciej, a Lithuanian apprentice and Aniela's love interest

== Production ==
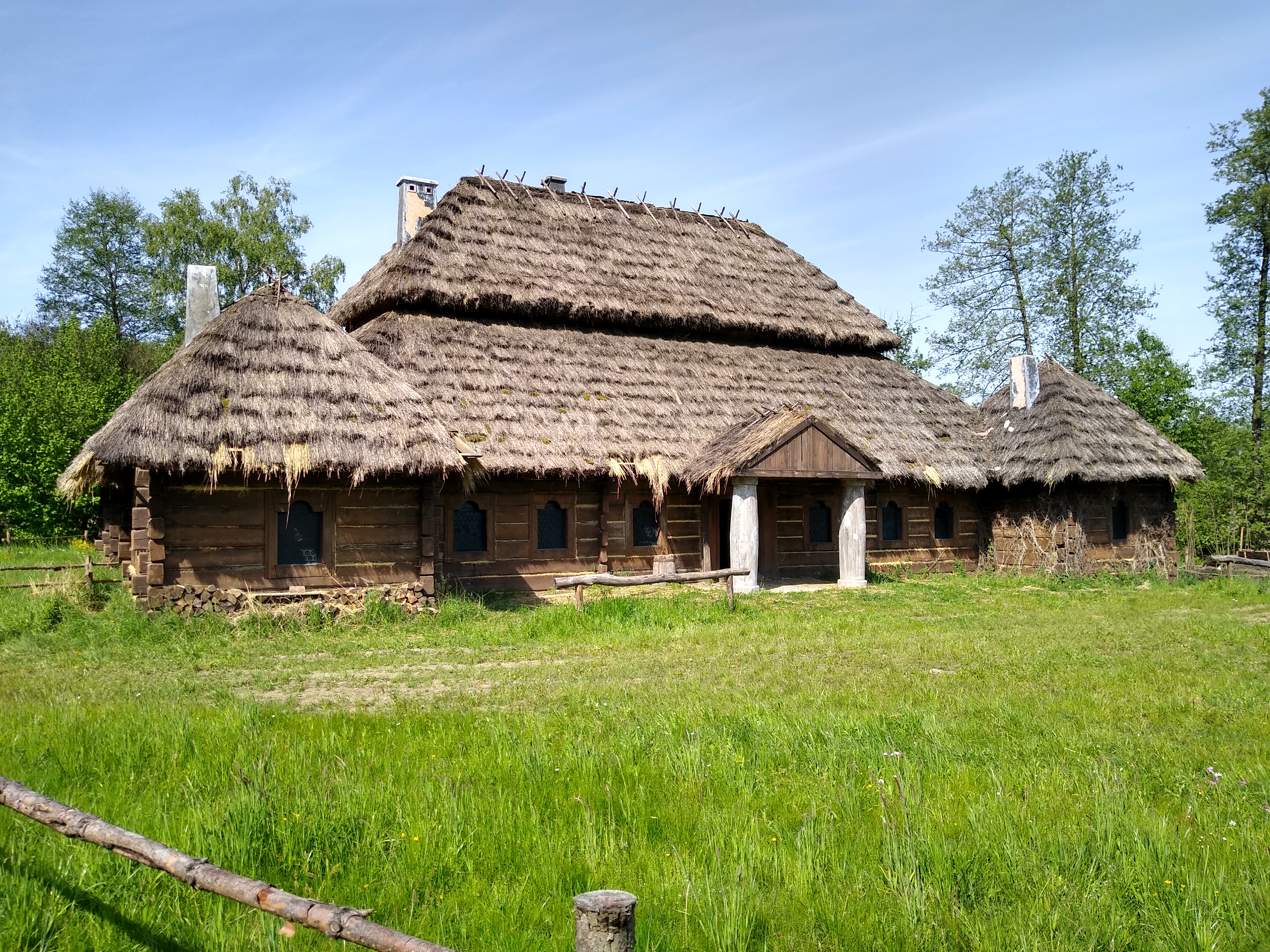
Exteriors of Adamczycha were filmed at the Museum of Folk Culture in Kolbuszowa.

Screenwriter Jakub Rużyłło was inspired to write the series after reading Fantomowe ciało króla: Peryferyjne zmagania z nowoczesną formą by sociologist Jan Sowa. After learning the premise of 1670 from Rużyłło, producers Ivo Krankowski and Jan Kwieciński collaborated to create the series. The team reached out to several broadcasters who rejected the series before it was ultimately greenlit by Netflix. Bartłomiej Topa, Katarzyna Herman, Andrzej Kłak, and Dobromir Dymecki were all cast without an audition.

Adamczycha, a village of about 100 residents, was chosen as the series' setting after director Kordian Kądziela saw it on a map and liked the name. Although the series is set in Adamczycha, it was filmed at the open-air Museum of Folk Culture in Kolbuszowa. Several scenes in the first season were also filmed at St. Paraskevi Church in Radruż.

Only when I entered the set did I realize how sensitively and precisely this world had been created. The set was not made of plywood, plasterboard and a piece of wall pretending to be a cottage. We had an open-air museum in Kolbuszowa, to which several buildings were added, which created our village of Adamczycha. It looked so authentic that you basically just had to enter that space and play.

— Dobromir Dymecki, Radio Eska

Filming for the second season took place on the Croatian island of Vir in September 2024. Filming wrapped in early December 2024.

== Episodes ==
=== Series overview ===
Series	Episodes	Originally released
1	8	13 December 2023
2	8	17 September 2025
3	8	5 August 2026

=== Season 1 (2023) ===
No. overall	No. in season	Title	Running time (in minutes)	Original release date
1	1	"The Assembly" (Sejmik)	36 min	13 December 2023
Jan Paweł Adamczewski, a nobleman who owns half of the village of Adamczycha, is determined to become the most famous Jan Paweł in Polish history. He receives a letter inviting him to a territorial assembly (sejmik), where he plans to sabotage the proposed tax increases by his enemy, Andrzej, who owns the larger half of Adamczycha. At the assembly, Jan Paweł opposes all of the proposed motions and, due to liberum veto, they are all nullified. Jan Paweł considers the assembly a great success.
2	2	"The Estate" (Folwark)	31 min	13 December 2023
Because of profit sharing, Andrzej's peasants are happier and his estate (folwark) yields more crops than Jan Paweł's. Jan Paweł, who believes in corporal punishment and trickle-down economics, tries other methods to motivate his peasants, but they are unreceptive. Aniela is determined to recruit the peasants to her cause to fight climate change. Initially, Maciej makes fun of her, but eventually joins the cause. Jakub finds a peasant who he mistakenly believes to be the reincarnation of Jesus Christ. Zofia is skeptical and asks the peasant to walk across water, but the peasant drowns. Stanisław announces his engagement to Jadwiga, a girl from the city.
3	3	"Spring" (Wiosna)	35 min	13 December 2023
Jadwiga and her parents visit Adamczycha to meet Stanisław's family. Zofia is initially cold to Jadwiga's mother, Rozalia, but later develops a romantic attraction to her. Jan Paweł becomes annoyed when his family shows more interest in Jadwiga's cultured father, Ciesław. While showing off his sabre (szabla), Jan Paweł accidentally cuts off Rozalia's finger, effectively ending their children's engagement; it is later revealed that Zofia took Rozalia's missing finger as a romantic token. At a party to commemorate the annual drowning of Marzanna, Aniela and Maciej get drunk and dance together.
4	4	"Equality March" (Marsz równości)	34 min	13 December 2023
After Stanisław goes missing, Jakub, seeing a chance to inherit Jan Paweł's estate, tries to set up romantic opportunities between Maciej and Aniela in the hopes of getting her disowned. A march celebrating freedom and equality of religion is being organized, much to the dismay of Jan Paweł. Bogdan is kidnapped by Tatars and held for ransom. Maciej overhears fabricated gossip about Aniela's supposed engagement to a wealthy nobleman and is heartbroken.
5	5	"The Plague" (Dżuma)	29 min	13 December 2023
A traveling theatrical troupe arrives in Adamczycha to perform a stage play and Maciej is asked to assist in the performance. Jan Paweł learns about the Great Plague of London and becomes worried about his own health. Bogdan eats a bag of magic mushrooms and hallucinates that he is a son of the sultan of the Ottoman Empire. Aniela investigates suspicious letters that Zofia has been receiving. The leader of the troupe offers Maciej an opportunity to leave the village and join them.
6	6	"The Duel" (Pojedynek)	34 min	13 December 2023
Maciej devises a plan to escape Adamczycha and join the theater troupe. Jan Paweł challenges Jeremi, Andrzej's cousin, to a duel. Aniela is convinced that Zofia is having an affair with Ciesław, but later finds out that she has actually been volunteering at a shelter for single mothers. Aniela feels guilty for suspecting her mother's infidelity, not realizing that Zofia has actually been having an affair with Rozalia instead. Maciej abandons his escape plan when he overhears Aniela confessing her feelings for him. Jan Paweł withdraws from the duel and selects a peasant as his stand-in, who promptly kills Jeremi.
7	7	"The Hunt" (Polowanie)	30 min	13 December 2023
Henryk Lubopolski, the son of a wealthy nobleman, is found injured in the woods. Jan Paweł and Andrzej, sensing an opportunity to improve their social status, begin campaigning for one of their daughters to marry Henryk. Aniela, however, is repulsed by the idea of an arranged marriage. During a hunt, Andrzej and Jan Paweł continue their bid for Henryk's favor, but the hunt ends abruptly when Jan Paweł and Andrzej simultaneously shoot and kill Henryk after mistaking him for a moose. Bogdan accompanies Jakub to an exorcism, but only to be mauled by the possessed, who recovers as the demon moves to quietly possess Bogdan without Jakub noticing.
8	8	"The Wedding" (Wesele)	37 min	13 December 2023
A peasant wedding is taking place in Adamczycha and everyone is invited, including Ciesław and Rozalia. Andrzej is forced to sell his half of Adamczycha to Jan Paweł to avoid paying taxes. Father Żmija arrives from Sandomierz to investigate the disappearance of Henryk. Zofia and Rozalia have a falling out and their affair ends without either of their husbands finding out. Bogdan agrees to take the blame for Henryk's murder, and it is later revealed that Henryk was a wanted man, leaving Bogdan with a hefty reward. Aniela and Maciej finally share a kiss.

=== Season 2 (2025) ===
No. overall	No. in season	Title	Running time (in minutes)	Original release date
9	1	"The Al-Inklusiv" (Al-Inkluziw)	38 min	17 September 2025
The Adamczewski family goes on a vacation to Turkey during diplomatic negotiations between Poland and the Ottoman Empire. After the Polish delegation's interpreter is shot dead for drinking alcohol, Jan Paweł volunteers to be an interpreter despite having no knowledge of Turkish. He ends up exchanging a series of numbers between the Turks and the Polish delegation led by Jan Sobieski that somehow manages to produce a final treaty. As the Poles celebrate, Jan Paweł's companion and fellow noble, Leszek, is overwhelmed after eating a kebab for the first time and dies in front of him. Aniela and Zofia become fascinated at how women are more cultured in Turkey, but their guide, Yasemin, chides Aniela for her patronizing attitude. An illiterate Maciej tries to find someone who can read a letter from Aniela for him, but his expectations are thwarted when the letter turns out to be a casual update. After learning of a tale about adultery and bestiality from Yasemin, Zofia is haunted by a talking donkey.
10	2	"The Funeral" (Pogrzeb)	37 min	17 September 2025
Jan Paweł is tasked with bringing back Leszek's corpse and make the funeral arrangements. Things go awry when the corpse is mutilated by a wild boar and the Adamczewskis have to find a peasant, Bodzio, to play the role of the deceased at the funeral. Meanwhile Stanisław has to distract the widowed Countess Gryzelda by pretending to have fallen in love with her. Gryzelda falls for the trick and warns Stanisław against his father's dream of being selected to organize the upcoming harvest festival (dożynki). But she discovers Jan Paweł's deception at the funeral and awards him the hosting rights for the festival, knowing that it would crush him into debt. Gryzelda offers to take Stanisław in, but Bodzio rises from the coffin to urinate, causing Gryzelda to suffer a fatal heart attack and collapse into Leszek's grave.
11	3	"A Quick Bet" (Gierka)	38 min	17 September 2025
Desperate to raise funds for the harvest festival, Jan Paweł agrees to play a game of high-stakes poker at a casino against another nobleman, Eustachy, and bets his and Bogdan's assets. Jakub deduces that Eustachy is suffering from extreme flatulence that manifests when Eustachy is bluffing. Jan Paweł wins the game and doubles his takings, but returns to Adamczycha empty-handed after becoming addicted to a roulette game and squandering his money on it. Marcin, a royal marshal, arrives in Adamczycha to inspect the preparations for the harvest festival and impresses Aniela for behaving in a different manner from the pompous noblemen. Maciej becomes jealous at seeing Marcin and Aniela together and joins a syndicate stealing salt from the Adamczewskis in order to build a fortune and impress Aniela. Zofia begins suspecting that Aniela and Maciej are in a relationship and hires a peasant, Regina, to spy on Maciej.
12	4	"The Ball Game" (Palant)	31 min	17 September 2025
Jan Paweł seeks to convince Bogdan to invest in his estate by daring his peasants to compete against Andrzej's former peasants in a game of palant. Aniela tries to help her father but is ignored for being a woman. Aniela then sports a fake moustache to gain her father's attention, allowing her to influence the teamplay. A misogynist Jakub enlists Stanisław to drug their batsman with steroids in the hopes of him winning the game, only for him to explode. Stanisław then volunteers in his place, but hits the ball with such force that it hits Bogdan in the head and knocks out one of his eyeballs, which he casually dismisses. Despite Jan Paweł's defeat, Bogdan agrees to invest in his estate, but on the condition that he provide him with a wife.
13	5	"Witchcraft" (Gusła)	35 min	17 September 2025
Jan Paweł, Aniela, and Maciej have to search the forest for Andrzej, who has been living there in a primitive state, and his three daughters in order for one of them to marry Bogdan. Jan Paweł is separated from Aniela and Maciej when he follows a rusalka. The rusalka tries to abduct Jan Paweł, but is annoyed by his constant bantering and abandons him. Zofia consults Baba Yaga for her personal and family problems, including the talking donkey, but they are caught by a monster hunter and brought to a torture festival to be burnt at the stake. Jan Paweł is reunited with Aniela and declares that she will run his estate. Jan Paweł, Aniela, and Maciej run into Andrzej at the festival. Andrzej agrees to the marriage proposal on the condition that he and his daughters will be allowed to stay with the Adamczewskis. Aniela discovers her mother and other witches being prepared for burning and unsuccessfully tries to prevent their deaths, only for Marcin to arrive and put a complete stop to the executions. Stanisław and Jakub race to the library to destroy evidence that their ancestor had forged his family's certificate of nobility, but end up setting the library on fire.
14	6	"Kupala Night" (Noc Kupały)	34 min	17 September 2025
Jan Paweł and Jakub arrange for Andrzej's daughters to undergo a Bachelor-like competition to win Bogdan's hand, despite them preferring Marcin and expressing disgust at Bogdan's manners. Bogdan bungles his dates with Andrzej's first two daughters Teresa and Dagmara, but falls for Kornelia after learning that they both share the same eccentricities. However, Bogdan casually selects Teresa as his bride after Andrzej insists on having his eldest daughter wedded first, to the sorrow of Teresa and Stanisław, who are mutually attracted. As the peasants celebrate Kupala Night, Aniela and Marcin become closer to each other, while a prudish Zofia is unsettled by the debauchery and the talking donkey, leading her to seek sex from Jan Paweł who in a fit of selfishness, rejects her. Maciej rejects Regina's advances. In revenge, she betrays Maciej to Aniela for stealing salt from the Adamczewskis, resulting in his capture.
15	7	"Krakow" (Kraków)	33 min	17 September 2025
Jan Paweł, Bogdan, Stanisław, Jakub and Andrzej go to Kraków to celebrate Bogdan's bachelor party. Aniela learns from Regina that Maciej has also been detained in Krakow for interrogation and accompanies the menfolk to Krakow disguised as their coachman. Maciej is pressured by Father Żmija to identify Stasia, the ringleader of the salt syndicate but refuses. As Maciej is led out, Aniela rescues him. They are intercepted by Father Żmija, but Stasia hits him unconscious in gratitude for Maciej keeping silent. Maciej tries to convince Aniela to run away with him to Gdańsk, but Aniela, who is moved after discovering Rozalia's letters to Zofia, refuses saying that she wants to change Adamczycha and parts sorrowfully with Maciej. At a tavern, Bogdan's demon fully possesses him and flees after consuming loads of alcohol and being burned by the original baptism certificate of Poland that Andrzej passes to him as a wedding gift. The men pursue Bogdan to the tavern's escape room but are trapped as Bogdan kills their guide. Jakub distracts Bogdan to allow Stanisław to kill him, but Stanisław trips while lunging at Bogdan and stabs Andrzej in the foot instead. Bogdan begins to strangle Jan Paweł, but Aniela barges in and shoots Bogdan dead while the demon leaves him. Jan Paweł expresses confidence at Bogdan's estate passing to Zofia as his sister, earning sad glances from Stanisław and Jakub, who had unwittingly destroyed Zofia's family records in the library fire.
16	8	"The Harvest Festival" (Dożynki)	44 min	17 September 2025
Bogdan's inheritance passes instead to Teresa, while Jan Paweł enters into a deal with Andrzej to use the money to fund the harvest festival in exchange for Jan Paweł returning Poland’s baptism certificate to Andrzej. Jan Paweł and Andrzej host a feast with the King in attendance, with a guest appearance of an old war hero. Andrzej upstages Jan Paweł by announcing his intention to become head of the community, triggering a hasty campaign by Jan Paweł to win support from the guests. The vote is tied after Jakub, fed up at his father belittling him, influences half the guests to vote for Andrzej before presenting the Adamczewskis' falsified nobility certificate. Jan Paweł produces Poland's baptism certificate given to Bogdan and blackmails everyone by revealing a misspelling undermining the legitimacy of Poland's existence, prompting the guests to back down. As a compromise, the King grants joint leadership of Adamczycha to Jan Paweł and Andrzej. Jan Paweł celebrates but finds his children have abandoned him. Stanisław forms a traveling musical duo with Teresa, while Jakub leaves with Andrzej for Warsaw to further his ambitions of becoming the first Polish pope. Aniela courts Marcin but ultimately dumps him after realizing she still loves Maciej. Zofia finds out about Aniela and Maciej's romance and encourages her to find him. As Aniela leaves, Zofia encounters a donkey but gains the courage to ignore it before returning home to comfort a despondent Jan Paweł. In an epilogue, Bogdan revives following an supernatural thunderstorm.

=== Season 3 (2026) ===
No. overall	No. in season	Title	Running time (in minutes)	Original release date
17	1	"Sarmatian Exam" (Matura sarmacka)	36 min	5 August 2026
Eight months after the harvest festival, Aniela returns to Adamczycha after fruitlessly searching for Maciej across Europe, only to find the village in a decrepit state, after the library fire had destroyed all records of the nobility's status. Sifting through unanswered letters from Marcin, Aniela finds an overdue letter from the King declaring that he would ennoble those who could pass a qualifying examination (matura). The examiners, led by Jakub, arrive in Adamczycha, lifting Zofia's spirits and unsettling Jan Paweł. All the nobles pass the exam except for Jan Paweł, who fails to correctly identify Wincenty Kadłubek's nickname, and is told he would lose his noble status in 30 days unless otherwise rescinded by the King. Meanwhile, Maciej, now an apprentice to a traveling salesman, is captured by Cossacks who kill his master just as he gives him a pay raise. He is taken to the Cossack camp, only to find that it is being led by Bogdan.
18	2	"The Last Aurochs" (Ostatni tur)	33 min	5 August 2026
While disposing his trash in the forest, Jan Paweł overhears Andrzej and Jakub talking about the alleged appearance of an aurochs, a prized animal that had been hunted to extinction by the nobility. Seeing an opportunity to restore his noble status, Jan Paweł joins Andrzej and Jakub in searching for the animal, only to find the beast dying at the village cemetery after consuming Jan Paweł's refuse. The next morning, Aniela tells Jan Paweł that he is being summoned by the King to Warsaw. Meanwhile, Aniela tries to open a school for the peasants, only to be sabotaged by a jealous Regina. Maciej finds that Bogdan has amnesia, apart from vague memories of his being shot, and thinks that he is an anti-Polish Cossack who styles himself as the Lach-eater and seeks revenge on his shooter, unaware that it is Aniela. Maciej tries to escape using a sword that was inadvertently thrown at him by Bogdan, but is later captured and breaks the sword in the process. Bogdan spares Maciej when he offers to repair the blade.
19	3	"Yurodivy" (Jurodiwyj)	39 min	5 August 2026
In Warsaw, Jan Paweł attends a demonstration of a Siberian yurodivy who can predict the future. When the yurodivy unsettles the King by predicting the partitions of Poland, Jan Paweł ingratiates himself by claiming the King will become a supercentenarian and correctly guesses the King's upcoming meal. When the royal chamberlain informs him that the position of royal medium entails being castrated and locked up in a dungeon, Jan Paweł tries to give way to the yurodivy, who backs off when he overhears the castration requirement. In a final test, Jan Paweł tries to make an erroneous prediction that someone in the audience will get hurt, only for Andrzej to deliberately stab himself to humiliate Jan Paweł. However, the yurodivy's prediction that the King's capon will fly out of his plate comes true, and the latter is appointed royal medium instead. In revenge, the yurodivy thwarts Jan Paweł by warning that the King will die if he ennobles anyone who failed the qualifying exam. Meanwhile, Aniela comes across a depressed Marcin and curtly rejects his offer of marriage. Jakub receives an invitation from the Queen, only to be dejected when he comes across her socializing with Aniela. Despite his dour personality, Jakub is appointed by the Queen to oversee the reestablishment of Aniela's school in Adamczycha. Maciej accompanies Bogdan in buying steel from the Turks, only for Bogdan to be confronted with a slanderous letter he supposedly wrote against the Sultan. Maciej saves Bogdan by lecturing about disinformation and chain letters. Back in camp, Maciej comes across Marcin, who had been captured by the Cossacks after riding off in sorrow following Aniela's rejection.
20	4	"Luna"	37 min	5 August 2026
In Adamczycha, Jakub sabotages Aniela's school by revealing that the scientists involved are nepo babies. Jan Paweł gets into an argument with Aniela over whether it is possible to fly to the moon, but are interrupted when Kazimierz Siemienowicz shows them a prototype rocket. Jan Paweł proposes catapulting a person into the moon to establish a colony there. A peasant, Mirek, volunteers to go, but the launch goes awry and the townsfolk leave when Jan Paweł finds no trace of Mirek on his telescope. Meanwhile, Zofia impresses Andrzej when she terrorizes his rebellious daughters into submission. Maciej finishes replacing Bogdan's sword, despite Marcin's constant laments for Aniela. Bogdan orders Maciej to defeat Marcin in exchange for his freedom, but before they can fight, Marcin is killed after being squashed by the catapulted Mirek, who mistakes the Cossacks for aliens. The next day, Bogdan sees Marcin's drawing of Aniela, renewing his desire for revenge. Maciej volunteers to accompany him in his search.
21	5	"A Gift for the Tatars" (Dar dla Tatarów)	35 min	5 August 2026
Aniela and Jakub accompany Jan Paweł to Warsaw after receiving a royal summons. Separately, Bogdan and Maciej, both disguised as nobles, arrive in Warsaw searching for Aniela. The King asks Jan Paweł and other nobles for advice in dealing with the Tatars. Aniela and Jakub seek an audience with the Queen, with Jakub intending to shut down Aniela's school. But in a fit of vanity, Jakub loses his resume and leaves to search for it, allowing Aniela to curry further support from the Queen. Jan Paweł encounters Maciej but does not recognize him. Aniela catches a glimpse of Maciej but is unable to find him in the royal palace as she mutters in frustration, only to be heard by Maciej, who distracts Bogdan away to protect her. Jakub comes across Bogdan, who does not remember him, and warns Jan Paweł before the latter sees Bogdan for himself. Jan Paweł then proposes to the King that Bogdan be given off to the Tatars as a sacrifice, but the Tatars release him anyway, with their leader suggesting he return to Adamczycha. Bogdan then asks Maciej to accompany him there.
22	6	"Virgo" (Panna)	35 min	5 August 2026
Andrzej introduces horoscopes to Adamczycha, causing a stir among residents, upsetting the conservative Zofia and unsettling Jan Paweł, who questions his manhood after finding that his star sign is Virgo. After seeking advice from Aniela, he begins identifying as a woman. When Jan Paweł overhears Andrzej discussing his plans with Zofia to marry off Dagmar to another noble, Władysław, Jan Paweł schemes to marry Władysław instead in the hopes of gaining ennoblement through marriage. Jan Paweł convinces Władysław to marry him, only to be met with ridicule from Andrzej and Jakub. Jan Paweł tries to enlist Zofia's support to annul their marriage so he can become Władysław's spouse, but Zofia leaves him for Andrzej instead. Jan Paweł sinks in despair into a cesspool amid a heavy downpour, but is rescued by Jakub, who reconciles with his father. At her school, Aniela unwittingly teaches the peasants how to read a manifesto inciting them to rebellion.
23	7	"Flauto Traverso"	39 min	5 August 2026
Jan Paweł discusses with Jakub and Aniela on how to bring Zofia back. After hearing the circumstances of his parents' wedding, Jakub organizes the peasants into reenacting an uprising that occurred when they were wedded. Aniela holds a field trip for her students to her family manor, only to incite them further with the luxuries inside. Jan Paweł challenges Andrzej to a duel, only for both to be interrupted and held hostage along with Jakub by Bogdan. The hostages confuse Bogdan by convincing him that he is a talented flutist, despite him demonstrating to the contrary. Maciej reunites with Aniela and warns her about Bogdan's threat to kill her, but leaves Aniela heartbroken when he reluctantly denies his feelings for her. Jakub and Jan Paweł hold the play about the uprising and a performance by Bogdan to impress Zofia, only for her to walk away in disgust. That night, Bogdan knocks Maciej down after realizing that he has been diverting him away from Aniela and joins the peasants in their uprising. At the manor, Zofia states to Jan Paweł her intention to leave him for good, only to be interrupted by the arrival of Stanisław, Teresa and their newborn son.
24	8	"Rise of the Machines" (Bunt maszyn)	38 min	5 August 2026
Andrzej, his other daughters, and the royal couple visit the Adamczewskis and their grandson, named Jan Andrzej, but are then besieged by rebelling peasants led by Bogdan. In the chaos, Regina releases an enchained Maciej. Bogdan enters the Adamczewski manor to negotiate and demands Aniela's head in exchange for the occupants' lives, but recovers his memories when Kornelia serves guinea fowl. Andrzej offers to give up Aniela and insists that Bogdan fathered Teresa's child, causing Zofia and Jan Paweł to reconcile through their common hatred for Andrzej. Jan Paweł, Bogdan and Jakub step outside to talk with the peasants, only to be hauled outside with the rest of the occupants. Maciej arrives and shares a kiss with Aniela before being separated. As Jan Paweł is placed on a chopping block, Mirek returns, relieving the peasants and allowing Jan Paweł to make a speech calming them down into dispersing. As a reward, the King ennobles Jan Paweł, while Bogdan is appointed Grand Hetman and rides off with the royal entourage. Maciej and Aniela make their relationship official, while the Adamczewskis, along with Maciej and Andrzej's family, pose for a group portrait.

== Release ==
The series' official trailer was released on 8 November 2023. As part of the series' marketing, Polish influencers were sent bags of hay branded with the 1670 logo.

In early 2024, the series was renewed for a second season, which was released on Netflix on 17 September 2025. To promote the second season, Netflix hosted a temporary exhibition at the Museum of Polish History, titled "We Are All from Adamczycha". Netflix also organized a harvest festival (dożynki) in the village of Adamczycha, which took place from 19 to 21 September 2025.

On 1 April 2025, the series was renewed for a third season, which was released on 5 August 2026. On 24 August 2026, Netflix renewed the show for a fourth season, set to premiere in 2027.

== Reception ==
=== Critical response ===
Polish critics generally reacted favorably to the series, much to the surprise of director Kordian Kądziela. Magdalena Drozdek of WP Teleshow wrote, "There was a high probability that the mocking series about the Polish nobility would be such a festival of embarrassment that we would want to forget about it quickly. But the creators of 1670 serve this embarrassment so well that you will have a great time." Małgorzata Major of Wirtualne Media wrote, "Playing with history and tradition is something that does not always gain mass admiration, but for fans of absurd humor and crossing boundaries in comedy, the series 1670 is a must-see."

Ola Gersz of NaTemat.pl gave the series four out of five stars, commending its humor, costuming, and production design. She further wrote, "There has never been anything like this in Poland. Finally, we learn to laugh at ourselves and we can be politically correct, but with class, humor, edge and... brains. It will be a hit." Natalia Nowecka of Radio Eska called 1670 "a masterpiece" and "the series this country needed." Katarzyna Ulman of Świat Seriali called the series "perfect" and commended its writing and performances, particularly that of Bartłomiej Topa.

Tomasz Zacharczuk of Trojmiasto.pl wrote, "To point out Poles' national vices and ridicule the most frequently repeated stereotypes, using the story of 17th-century mustachioed Sarmatians and using the mockumentary formula typical of productions such as The Office or What We Do in the Shadows? Madness. It could only end in two ways—either a spectacular flop or a spectacular triumph... It is with clear relief, but above all with the feeling of a great time spent, that we can officially announce the second one. 1670 is the best Polish comedy production of recent years." Jacek Cieślak of Rzeczpospolita compared the series to the 1981 film Teddy Bear, writing, "The series will be funny for some and painful for others because it does not recognize taboos."

On the other hand, reviewing the series' first episode, Joel Keller of Decider wrote, "The first episode of 1670 is designed to be a laugh-a-minute mockumentary, but it barely elicited a chuckle from us. The reason why isn't the language barrier, it's the fact that the satire is over-the-top and unfocused." He also stated that "1670 has the potential to be a good ensemble comedy, but the comedy it aims for is way too broad to be sustainable."

=== Accolades ===
Award	Year	Category	Result	Ref.
Polish Film Awards	2024	Best TV Series	Won	
Polish Film Awards	2026	Best TV Series	Nominated	
