= Gmina Baranowo =

Gmina Baranowo Baranowo Commune
- Gmina
- Flag Coat of arms

- Location within Poland
- Coordinates (Baranowo): 53°10′30″N 21°17′43″E
- Country: Poland
- Voivodeship: Masovian
- County: Ostrołęka County
- Seat: Baranowo

Area
  - Total: 198.19 km^{2} (76.52 sq mi)

Population (2011)
  - Total: 6,848
  - Density: 34.55/km^{2} (89.49/sq mi)
- Website: www.baranowo.pl

Gmina Baranowo is a rural gmina (administrative district) in Ostrołęka County, Masovian Voivodeship, in east-central Poland. Its seat is the village of Baranowo, which lies approximately 22 kilometres (14 mi) north-west of Ostrołęka and 109 km (68 mi) north of Warsaw.

The gmina covers an area of 198.19 square kilometres (76.5 sq mi), and as of 2006 its total population is 6,754 (6,848 in 2011).

== Villages ==
Gmina Baranowo contains the villages and settlements of Adamczycha, Bakuła, Baranowo, Błędowo, Brodowe Łąki, Budne Sowięta, Cierpięta, Czarnotrzew, Dąbrowa, Dłutówka, Gaczyska, Guzowatka, Jastrząbka, Kopaczyska, Kucieje, Lipowy Las, Majdan, Majki, Nowe Czerwińskie, Oborczyska, Orzeł, Ramiona, Rupin, Rycica, Witowy Most, Wola Błędowska, Zawady and Ziomek.

== Neighbouring gminas ==
Gmina Baranowo is bordered by the gminas of Chorzele, Czarnia, Jednorożec, Kadzidło, Krasnosielc, Lelis, Myszyniec and Olszewo-Borki.
