= Błędowo, Ostrołęka County =

Błędowo
- Village
- Location within Poland
- Coordinates: 53°14′N 21°13′E
- Country: Poland
- Voivodeship: Masovian
- County: Ostrołęka
- Gmina: Baranowo

Błędowo [bwɛnˈdɔvɔ] is a village in the administrative district of Gmina Baranowo, within Ostrołęka County, Masovian Voivodeship, in east-central Poland.
