= Kordian Kądziela =

Film director and screenwriter (born 1987)

- Born: 4 July 1987 (age 39); Kędzierzyn-Koźle
- Occupations: Film director, screenwriter

Kordian Kądziela (born 4 July 1987) is a film director and screenwriter.

== Biography ==
He grew up in Głogówek. In 2019 he graduated in film directing from the Katowice Film School.

== Filmography ==
=== Short films ===
- Matko Bosko! (2010)
- Garp! (2011)
- Tiwi (2012)
- Muka! (2012)
- Larp (2014)
- Szczękościsk (2016)
- Fusy (2017)

=== Feature films ===
- LARP: Love, Trolls and Other Quests (2025)

=== Television series ===
- Mental (2021)
- 1670 (2024– )

Source.

== Awards ==
- Paszport Polityki nomination in the film category (2025)
- Janusz “Kuba” Morgenstern “Perspektywa” Award for LARP: Love, Trolls and Other Quests (2025)
- Marcin Wrona Award for LARP. Miłość, trolle i inne questy (2026)
