= Cierpięta, Pomeranian Voivodeship =

Cierpięta
- Village
- Location within Poland
- Coordinates: 53°51′N 19°9′E
- Country: Poland
- Voivodeship: Pomeranian
- County: Sztum
- Gmina: Mikołajki Pomorskie
- Population: 155

Cierpięta [t͡ɕɛrˈpjɛnta] is a village in the administrative district of Gmina Mikołajki Pomorskie, within Sztum County, Pomeranian Voivodeship, in northern Poland. It lies approximately 2 km (1 mi) west of Mikołajki Pomorskie, 12 km (7 mi) south-east of Sztum, and 67 km (42 mi) south-east of the regional capital Gdańsk.

Before 1772 the area was part of Kingdom of Poland, and in 1772–1945 it belonged to Prussia and Germany. For the history of the region, see History of Pomerania.
