= Dąbrowa, Ostrołęka County =

Dąbrowa
- Village
- Location within Poland
- Coordinates: 53°15′43″N 21°11′30″E
- Country: Poland
- Voivodeship: Masovian
- County: Ostrołęka
- Gmina: Baranowo

Dąbrowa [dɔmˈbrɔva] is a village in the administrative district of Gmina Baranowo, within Ostrołęka County, Masovian Voivodeship, in east-central Poland.
