= Jastrząbka =

Village in Gmina Baranowo, Poland

- Village
- Location within Poland
- Coordinates: 53°7′59″N 21°14′50″E
- Country: Poland
- Voivodeship: Masovian
- County: Ostrołęka
- Gmina: Baranowo

Jastrząbka [jasˈtʂɔmpka] is a village in the administrative district of Gmina Baranowo, within Ostrołęka County, Masovian Voivodeship, in east-central Poland.
