= Nowe Minięta =

- Village
- Location within Poland
- Coordinates: 53°52′37″N 19°11′55″E
- Country: Poland
- Voivodeship: Pomeranian
- County: Sztum
- Gmina: Mikołajki Pomorskie
- Population: 116

Nowe Minięta [ˈnɔvɛ miˈɲɛnta] is a village in the administrative district of Gmina Mikołajki Pomorskie, within Sztum County, Pomeranian Voivodeship, in northern Poland.

For the history of the region, see History of Pomerania.

== Demographics ==
As of 2011, the village had a population of 116.
