= Barepat =

Village in Gegharkunik, Armenia

Barepat Բարեպատ
- Location within Armenia Location within Gegharkunik
- Coordinates: 40°40′13″N 45°06′56″E
- Country: Armenia
- Province: Gegharkunik
- Municipality: Chambarak
- Elevation: 1,401 m (4,596 ft)

Population (2011)
  - Total: 68
- Time zone: UTC+4 (AMT)

Barepat (Armenian: Բարեպատ; Azerbaijani: Bəyrabad or Bəriabad) is a village in the Chambarak Municipality of the Gegharkunik Province of Armenia. The village is a part of the Kalavan community. The village was populated by Azerbaijanis before the exodus of Azerbaijanis from Armenia during the outbreak of the Nagorno-Karabakh conflict. In 1988–1989 Armenian refugees from Azerbaijan settled in the village.
