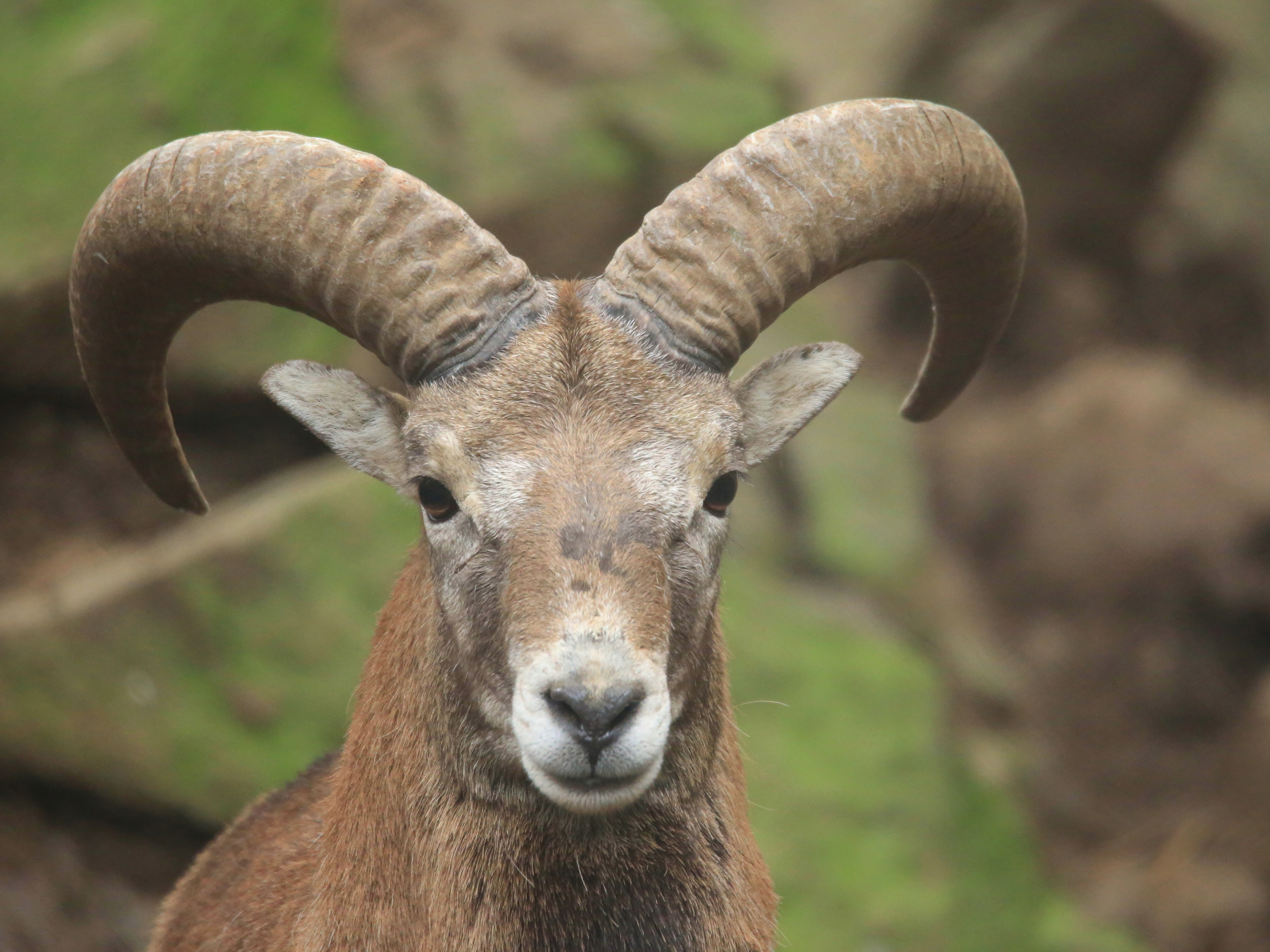

Scientific classification
- Kingdom: Animalia
- Phylum: Chordata
- Class: Mammalia
- Order: Artiodactyla
- Family: Bovidae
- Subfamily: Caprinae
- Genus: Ovis
- Species: O. orientalis
- Subspecies: O. o. ophion

Trinomial name
- Ovis orientalis ophion Blyth, 1841

= Cyprus mouflon =

Endangered subspecies of mouflon

The Cyprus mouflon (Ovis orientalis ophion), also known as Cypriot mouflon, is an endangered subspecies of mouflon endemic only to Cyprus in the mountains of Paphos District. It is the largest animal on the island, a meter tall (at the shoulder), and due to its uniqueness and rarity it is the national animal of Cyprus.

== History ==
It is believed to be the wild descendant of sheep brought introduced in the island from Asia by the Eteocypriots people during the Neolithic period. Roman archeology discovered from Cyprus have shown depictions of the mouflon on mosaics and frescoes.

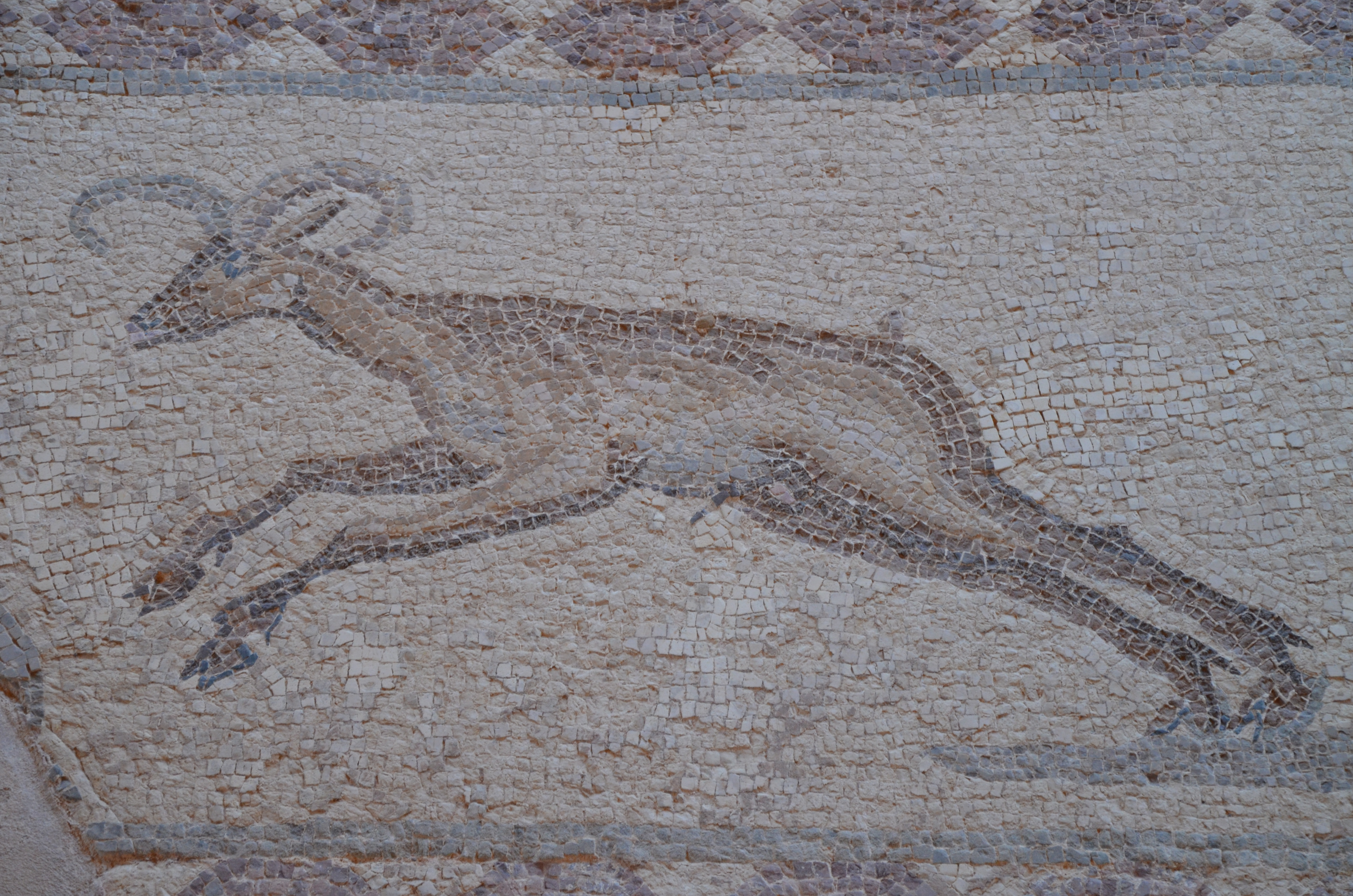
Mosaic in the House of Dionysus, Paphos Archaeological Park, Cyprus.

It was nearly driven to extinction during the 20th century. In 1997, about 1,200 individuals were counted. The television show Born to Explore with Richard Wiese reported 3,000 individuals on Cyprus.

== Etymology ==
It is also called agrino in the island from the Greek word (Αγρινό). The scientific name was proposed by Edward Blyth in 1841 for wild sheep in the Middle East. In recent years its scientific name was changed after more in depth study.

== Description ==
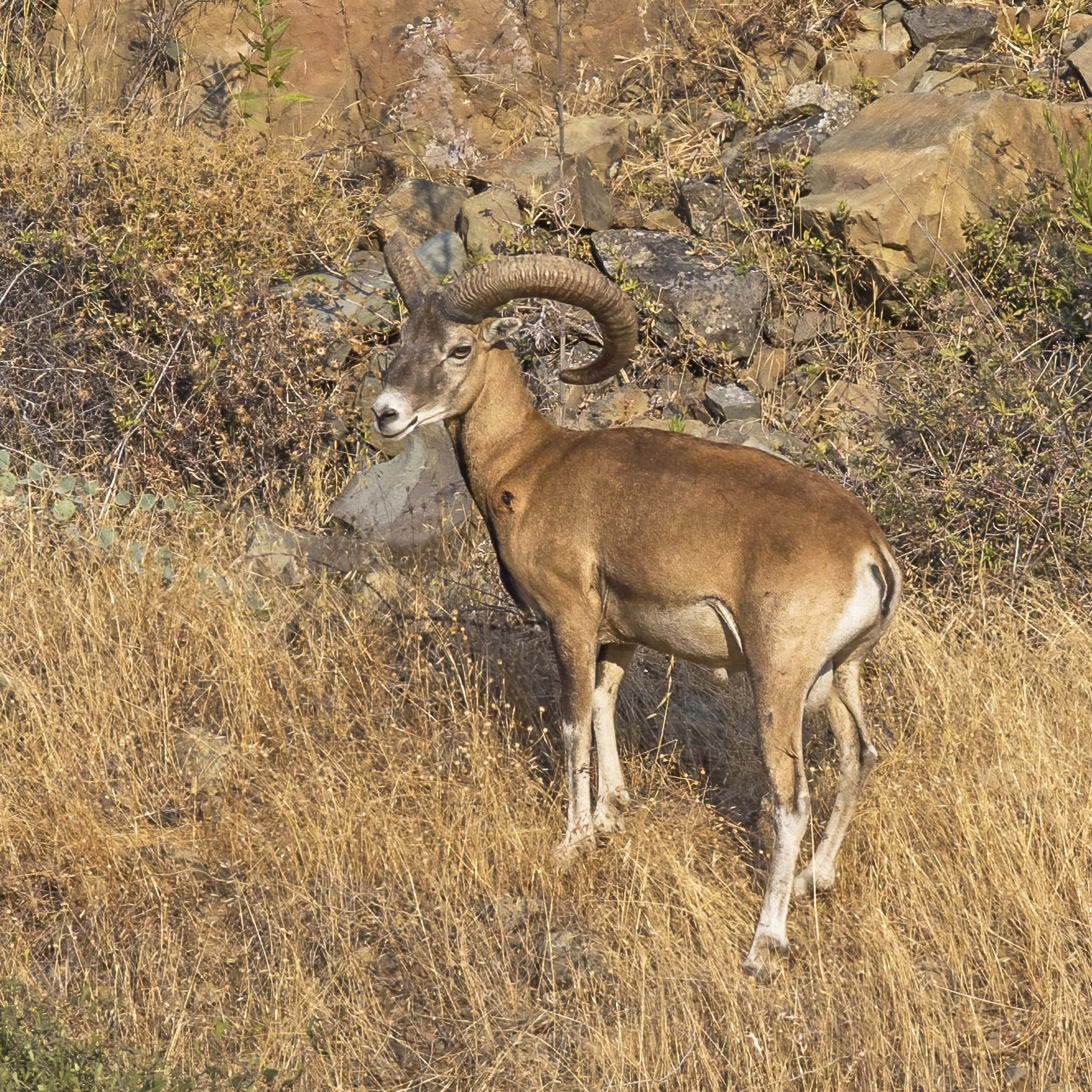
An adult male in the wild

Cypriot mouflon have short hair, reddish to dark brown colour with dark black stripes on saddle area. Males have horns and females are usually without horns. In mature mouflons the horns are actually almost fully curled into a circle.

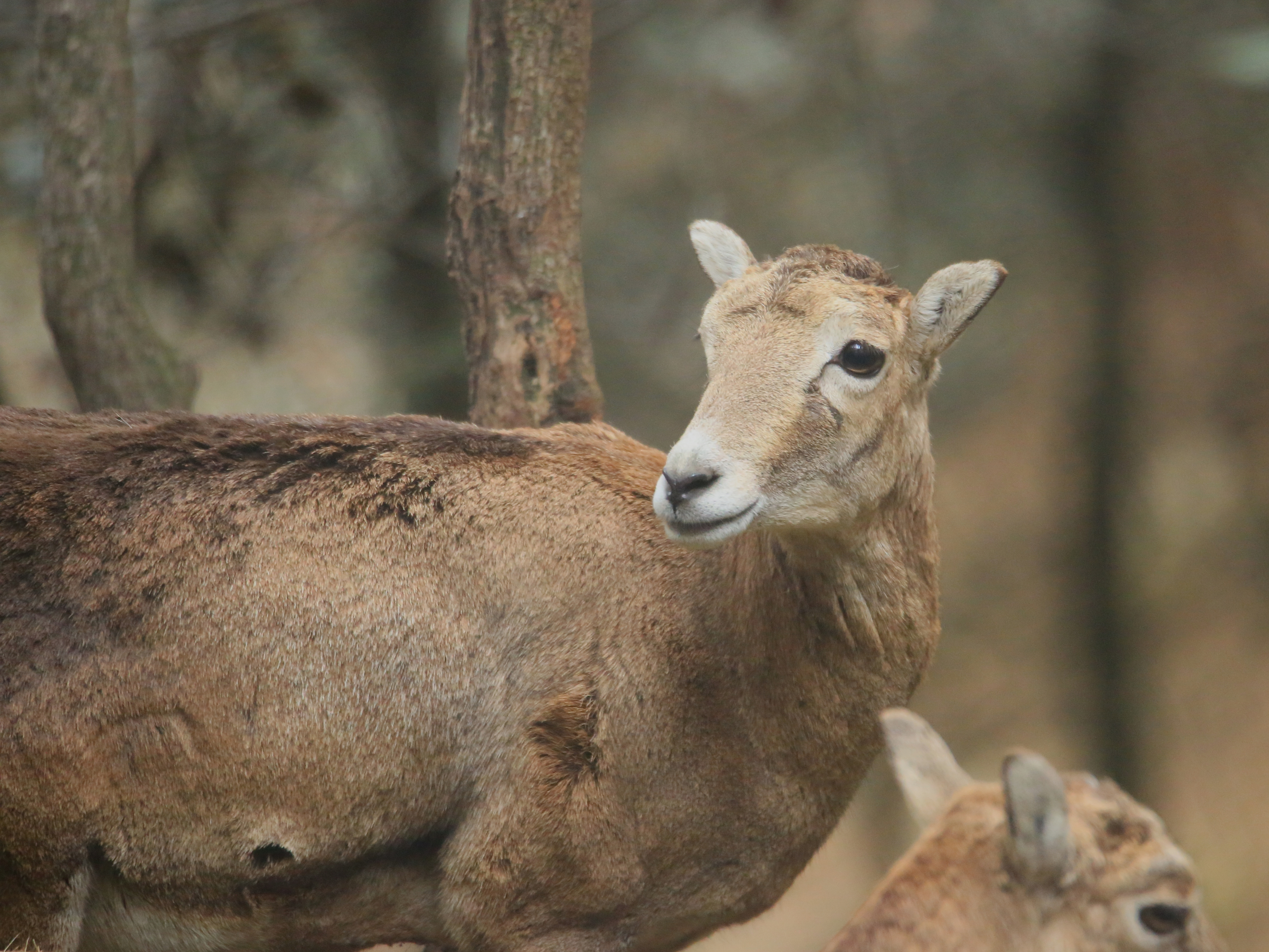
Females are polled meaning without horns

The males can weight up to 50 kg and the females around 35 kg.

Their coat in winter becomes heavy and dense while in summer the coat changes and becomes lighter in thickness and colour so that they can cope with the heat.

== Behavior ==
The Cypriot mouflon is a very cautious, shy and agile animal and is not easily approached by humans. They move very fast on the steep slopes of the island and are very difficult to approach, especially when they are frightened. The males tend to stay alone. The female gives birth in April and May and usually either one or two lambs are born. They tend to live in small herds.
