= Kalavan =

Village in Gegharkunik, Armenia

Kalavan Կալավան
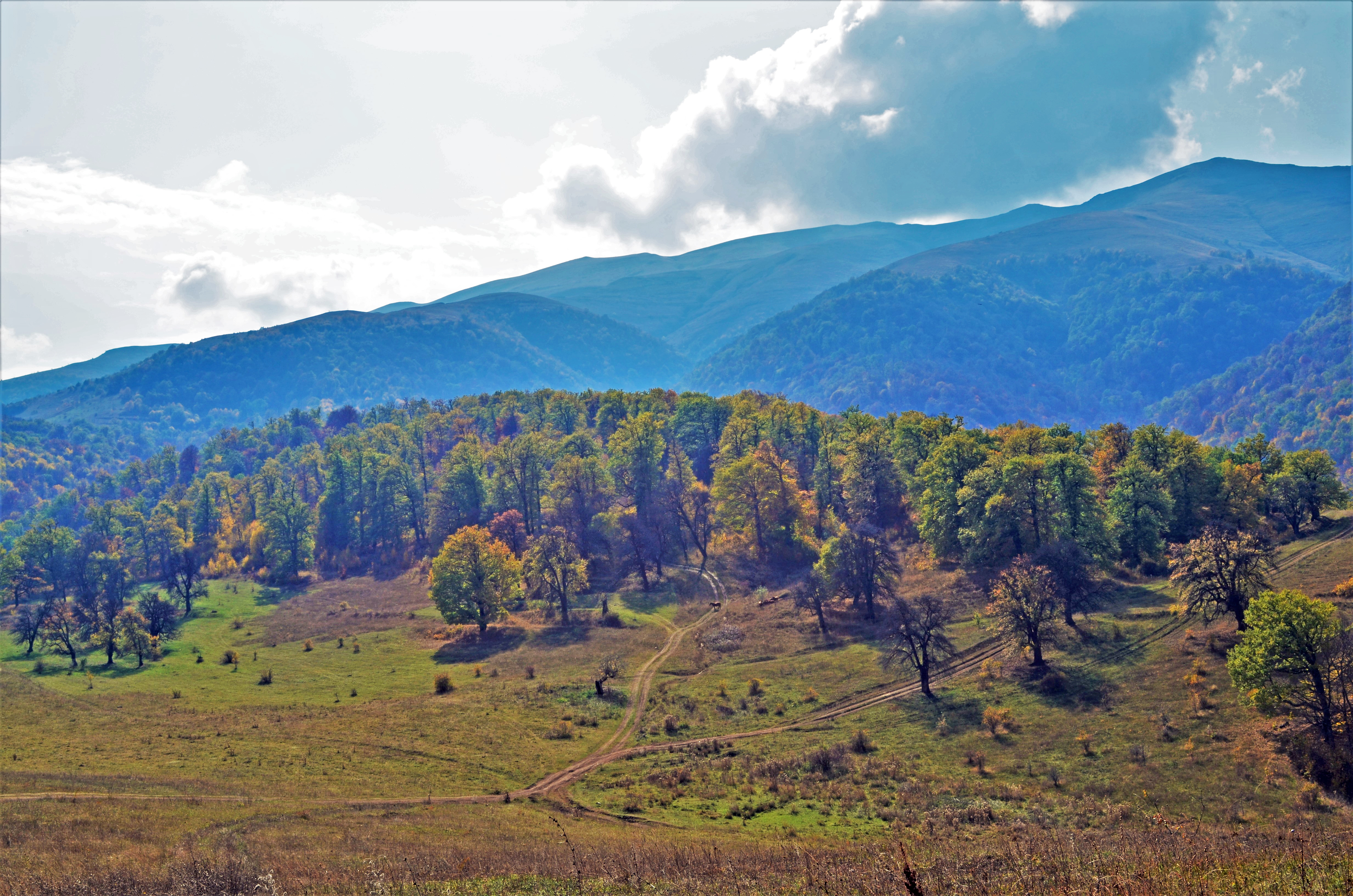
- Scenery around Kalavan

- Location within Armenia Location within Gegharkunik
- Coordinates: 40°39′N 45°07′E
- Country: Armenia
- Province: Gegharkunik
- Municipality: Chambarak

Population (2011)
  - Total: 117
- Time zone: UTC+4 (AMT)

Kalavan (Armenian: Կալավան) is a village in the Chambarak Municipality of the Gegharkunik Province of Armenia. The village is 1,600 meters above sea level, having cemeteries and stone-century outdoor stations in its surroundings. The village was populated by Azerbaijanis before the exodus of Azerbaijanis from Armenia after the outbreak of the Nagorno-Karabakh conflict. In 1988-1989 Armenian refugees from Azerbaijan settled in the village. Many well-known foreign and Armenian specialists have bought houses and initiated economic activities in Kalavan. This village has been described as an example of successful community development.

== History ==
The archaeological monument Kalavan 1 dates back to the 14th millennium, and Kalavan 2 is more than 34 thousand years old.

== Tourism ==
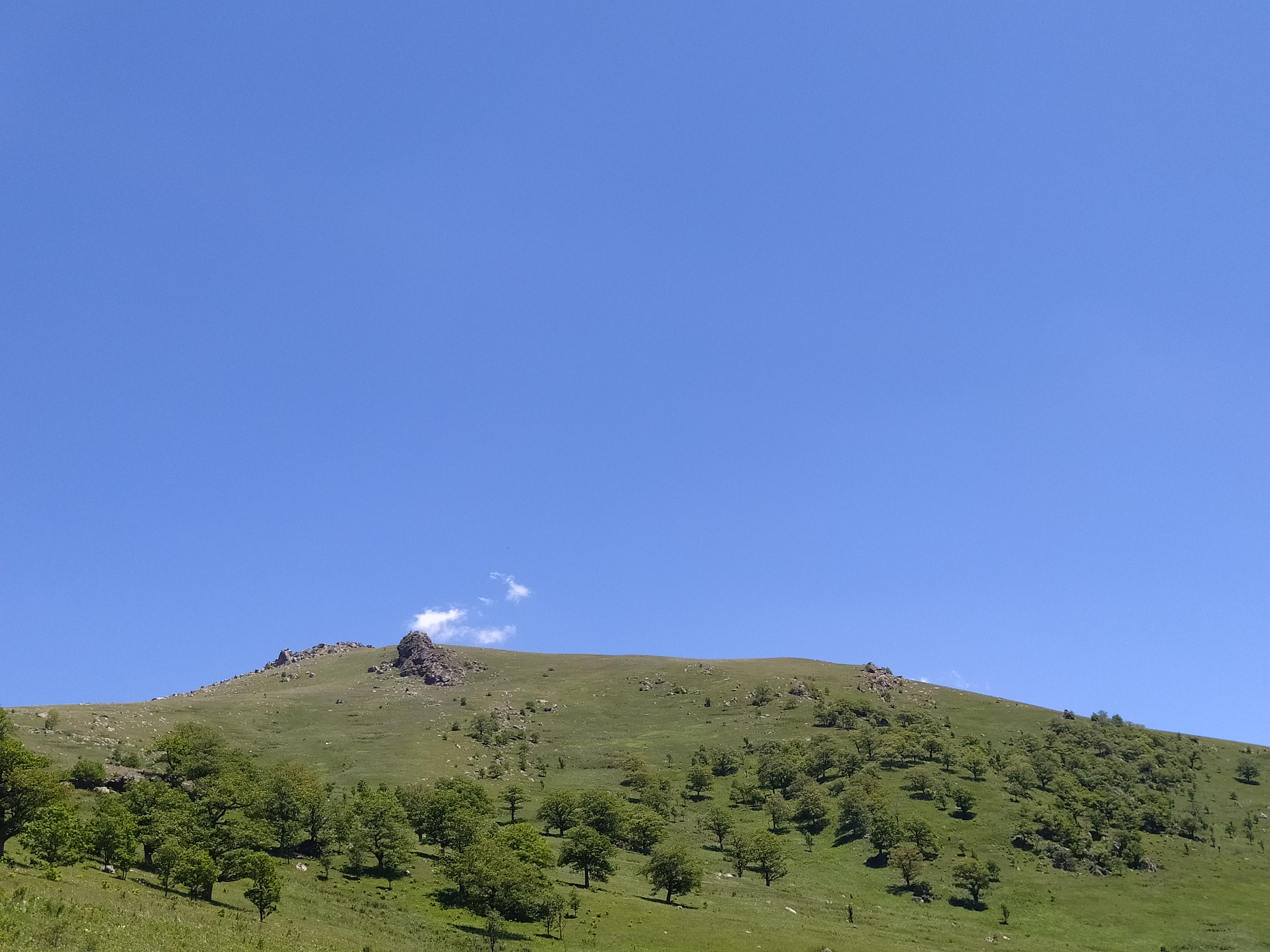
View of Mount Kenatsblur from Kalavan

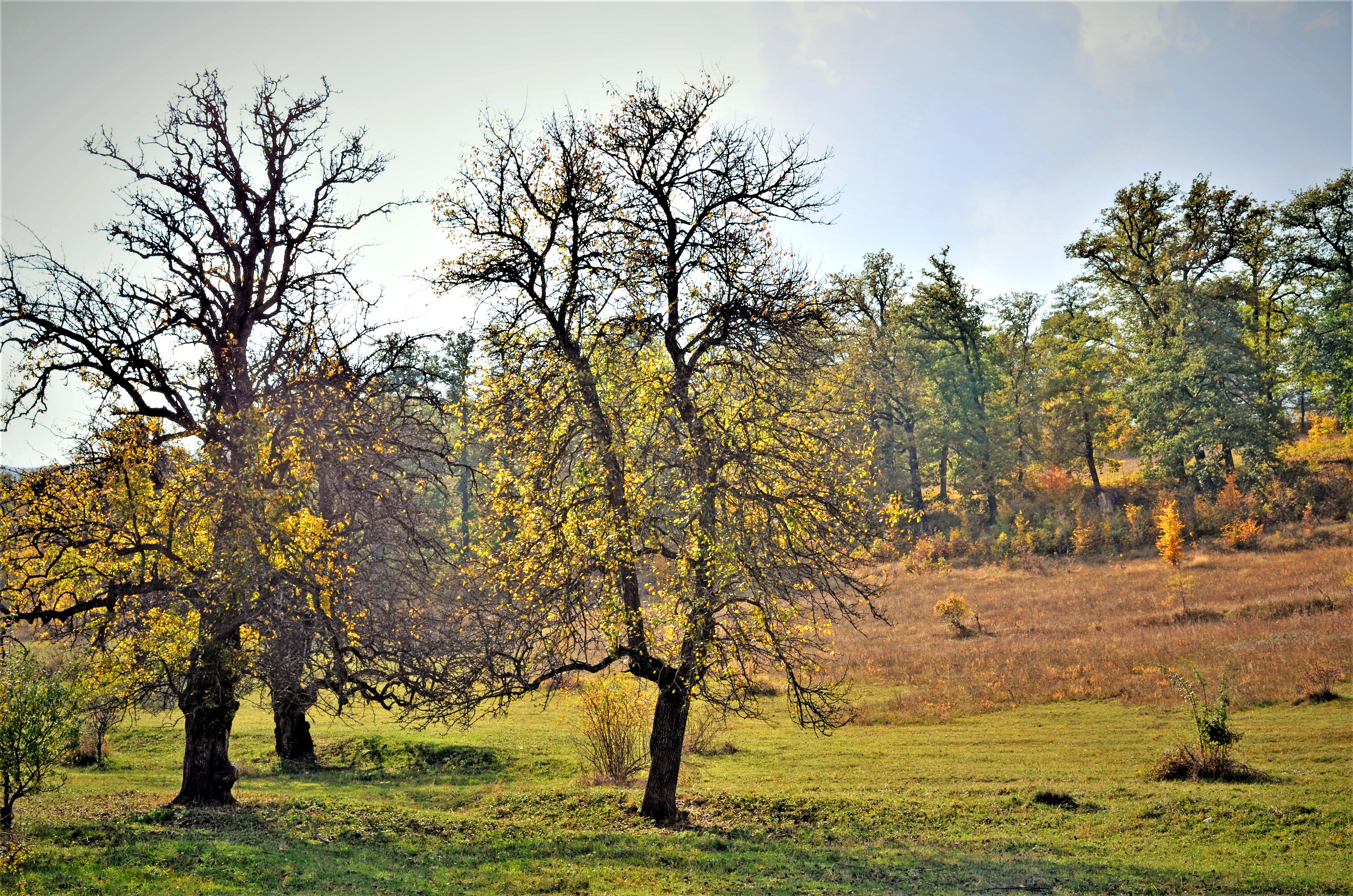
Scenery around Kalavan

An exciting archaeological tourism project is established in the village. A replica of a Stone Age settlement was constructed where visitors can learn the different skills of the primeval men, such as building houses, setting fires, collecting food and making tools and weapons. A Stone Age walking trail with animal shaped signs was designed to guide the visitors to several different locations around the village where they can practice these skills. Archery tournaments, horse chariot rides, hiking, biking, bird watching and the “Mammoth” intellectual team building game complete the offer.

There are tent camps being organized here with a lot of people coming. In 2016, 2 500 tourists visited the village, coming from countries ranging from Chile and Peru to Australia and Iran. Fifteen new guesthouses are currently under construction, and villagers spent the past summer revamping an existing 17 to accommodate more tourists.

Local touring companies offer biking and hiking tours to the Kalavan village departing from Sevan shore villages Tsovagyugh or Drakhtik.

== Demographics ==
=== Population ===
As of 2019, Kalavan had 113 inhabitants (26 families), most of whom were refugees. About 8 families moved here in recent years. There were eight births in the village in 2017.

== Infrastructure ==
A local school building was insulated with the help of AUA Acopian Center for the Environment. There are currently 19 students enrolled in the school.

The non-profit “Time Land Foundation” has been established in Kalavan, and its two-story, 250 square meters (2,700 sq. ft.) new building has been intended to serve as a scientific and research center for visiting scientists, housing a library and a cultural and community center for local youth. The $150,000 project is being funded by USAID, UNDP and private donors.

A four by four vehicle is the best mode of transportation on the seven-kilometer dirt road. It's about a 40-minute ride. The villagers have requested road repairs by compacting gravel, which should reduce the travel time by half. With a $60,000 excavator or backhoe the villagers would be able to repair and maintain the dirt road, additionally provide basic irrigation channels for local farms and build hiking and biking trails around the village.

There are no local grocery stores, bakeries or any retail stores in Kalavan. All supplies must be sourced from nearby towns. Kalavan doesn't have a natural gas network installed.

== Municipal administration ==
The Kalavan community also includes the nearby village of Barepat. The community had a total population of 185 in 2011.
