= LARP: Love, Trolls and Other Quests =

2025 film directed by Kordian Kądziela

- Directed by: Kordian Kądziela
- Written by: Kordian Kądziela, Michał Wawrzecki
- Starring: Filip Zaręba, Martyna Byczkowska, Maciej Bisiorek, Agnieszka Rajda, Mikołaj Chilimończyk
- Cinematography: Cezary Stolecki
- Edited by: Magdalena Chowańska
- Music by: Jan Sanejko
- Release date: 2025
- Country: Poland
- Language: Polish

LARP: Love, Trolls and Other Quests (Polish: LARP. Miłość, trolle i inne questy) is a 2025 film directed by Kordian Kądziela, written by Kądziela and Michał Wawrzecki.

== Cast ==
- Filip Zaręba as Sergiusz Raban
- Martyna Byczkowska as Helena Kuntarz
- Maciej Bisiorek as “Damon”
- Agnieszka Rajda as “Kostka”
- Mikołaj Chilimończyk as “Goliat”
- Andrzej Konopka as Hubert Raban, father of Sergiusz
- Michał Balicki as Remigiusz Raban, brother of Sergiusz
- Hubert Łapacz as Gonzalewicz “Gonzo”
- Filip Łannik as “Denis”
- Magda Góźdź as “Buchara”
- Bartłomiej Topa as writer Louis Lacroix
- Edyta Olszówka as Wioleta Chrupała-Sznaucer, principal of a technical secondary school
- Tomasz Drabek as teacher Fabian Ausztol
- Andrzej Kłak as teacher Kerm
- Elżbieta Okupska as Wanda, the shopkeeper
- Aleksander Janiszewski as uncle Darek

Source.

== Awards ==
- Award for Best Supporting Actor at the Polish Film Festival for Andrzej Konopka (2025)
- Youth Jury Award at the Polish Film Festival (2025)
- Janusz “Kuba” Morgenstern “Perspektywa” Award for best debut for Kordian Kądziela (2025)
- Award for Best Screenplay at the Koszaliński Festiwal Debiutów Filmowych „Młodzi i Film” (2026)
- Polish Academy Award for Best Supporting Actor for Andrzej Konopka (2026); in the same year nominations to Polish Academy Award for best make-up (Magdalena Tarka), best costume design (Wiola Uliasz) and discovery of the year (Kordian Kądziela)
- Pulsary Award for acting debut for Filip Zaręba (2026)
