= Budne Sowięta =

Village in Gmina Baranowo, Poland

- Village
- Location within Poland
- Coordinates: 53°9′42″N 21°19′43″E
- Country: Poland
- Voivodeship: Masovian
- County: Ostrołęka
- Gmina: Baranowo

Budne Sowięta [ˈbudnɛ sɔˈvjɛnta] is a village in the administrative district of Gmina Baranowo, within Ostrołęka County, Masovian Voivodeship, in east-central Poland.
