= Wilczewo, Sztum County =

Wilczewo
- Village
- Location within Poland
- Coordinates: 53°49′47″N 19°7′49″E
- Country: Poland
- Voivodeship: Pomeranian
- County: Sztum
- Gmina: Mikołajki Pomorskie
- Population: 70
- Time zone: UTC+1 (CET)
  - Summer (DST): UTC+2 (CEST)
- Postal code: 82-433
- Car plates: GSZ

Wilczewo [vilˈt͡ʂɛvɔ] is a village in the administrative district of Gmina Mikołajki Pomorskie, within Sztum County, Pomeranian Voivodeship, in northern Poland.

== History ==
In 1454 the village was incorporated into the Kingdom of Poland by King Casimir IV Jagiellon. In the 18th century, it became part of the Kingdom of Prussia, and from 1871 to 1945 it was also part of Germany. After Nazi Germany's defeat in World War II the village became again part of Poland.
