= Filip Zaręba =

Actor (born 2001)

- Born: 29 December 2001 (age 24)
- Occupation: Actor

Filip Zaręba (born 29 December 2001) is an actor.

== Biography ==
In 2026 he graduated in acting from the AST National Academy of Theatre Arts in Kraków.

== Filmography ==
- The Office PL (2023; TV series) as Piotrek (episode 36)
- Prawda24 (2024) as fan
- Live a Little (2024) as Kasper
- Pieśni piekarzy polskich (2025; TV spectacle)
- LARP: Love, Trolls and Other Quests (2025) as Sergiusz Raban
- 1670 (2025–2026; TV series) as Stanisław Adamczewski
- Proud (2026; TV series) as Kuba – not credited

Source.

== Awards ==
In 2025 he received ZASP Drama Theatre Section Award for her role in the play Fortissimo at the 43rd Theatre Schools Festival in Łódź (2025), and award for the best actor for his role in the play Pieśni piekarzy polskich (Songs of the Polish Bakers) at the 25th International Festival of Theatre Schools Istropolitana Project in Bratislava. In 2026, he received Pulsary Award for acting debut for his role in LARP: Love, Trolls and Other Quests.
