= Ruppin =

Ruppin may refer to:

== Locations ==
- Neuruppin, a town in Brandenburg, Germany
  - Ruppin Switzerland, a forest area near Neuruppin
  - Lordship of Ruppin
- Kfar Ruppin, a kibbutz in Israel

== Other ==
- Arthur Ruppin (1876–1943), a Zionist leader and one of the founders of the city of Tel Aviv
  - Ruppin Academic Center, a college in Israel named after Arthur Ruppin

== See also ==
- Rupin (disambiguation)
