= Cieszymowo Wielkie =

- Village
- Location within Poland
- Coordinates: 53°50′23″N 19°17′37″E
- Country: Poland
- Voivodeship: Pomeranian
- County: Sztum
- Gmina: Mikołajki Pomorskie
- Population: 570

Cieszymowo Wielkie [t͡ɕɛʂɨˈmɔvɔ ˈvjɛlkʲɛ] is a village in the administrative district of Gmina Mikołajki Pomorskie, within Sztum County, Pomeranian Voivodeship, in northern Poland.

For the history of the region, see History of Pomerania.
