= Pierzchowice =

- Village
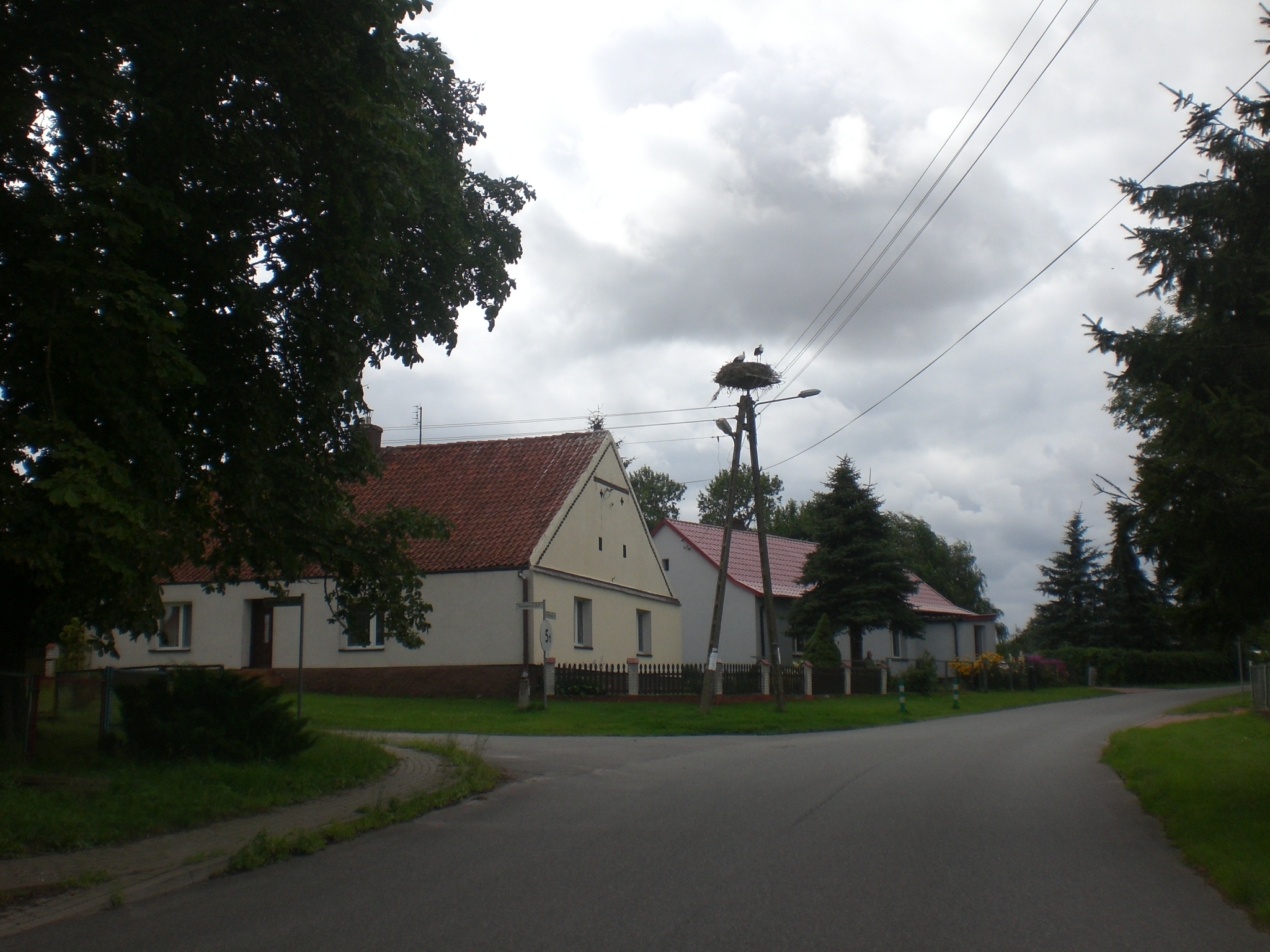

- Location within Poland
- Coordinates: 53°50′7″N 19°6′14″E
- Country: Poland
- Voivodeship: Pomeranian
- County: Sztum
- Gmina: Mikołajki Pomorskie

Population
  - Total: 130

Pierzchowice [pjɛʂxɔˈvit͡sɛ] is a village in the administrative district of Gmina Mikołajki Pomorskie, within Sztum County, Pomeranian Voivodeship, in northern Poland.

== History ==
Pierzchowice was a royal village of the Kingdom of Poland, administratively located in the Malbork Voivodeship.

In 1891, a Polish bank was founded in the village.
