= Zawady, Gmina Baranowo =

Zawady
- Village
- Location within Poland
- Coordinates: 53°16′02″N 21°14′00″E
- Country: Poland
- Voivodeship: Masovian
- County: Ostrołęka
- Gmina: Baranowo

Zawady [zaˈvadɨ] is a village in the administrative district of Gmina Baranowo, within Ostrołęka County, Masovian Voivodeship, in east-central Poland.

== History ==
Between 1975 and 1998, the village used to be part of Ostrołęka Voivodeship.
