= Adamczycha =

Village in Poland

- Village
- Location within Poland
- Coordinates: 53°6′25″N 21°15′48″E
- Country: Poland
- Voivodeship: Masovian
- County: Ostrołęka
- Gmina: Baranowo
- Population: 90

Adamczycha [adamˈt͡ʂɨxa] is a village in the administrative district of Gmina Baranowo, within Ostrołęka County, Masovian Voivodeship, in east-central Poland.

== In popular culture ==
The Netflix mockumentary series 1670 takes place in Adamczycha.
