= Gmina Mikołajki Pomorskie =

Gmina Mikołajki Pomorskie Mikołajki Pomorskie Commune
- Gmina
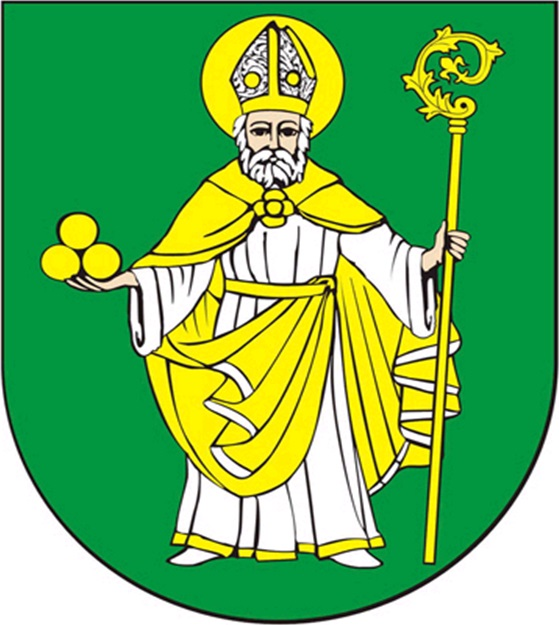
- Coat of arms
- Interactive map of Gmina Mikołajki Pomorskie
- Coordinates (Mikołajki Pomorskie): 53°51′5″N 19°10′2″E
- Country: Poland
- Voivodeship: Pomeranian
- County: Sztum
- Seat: Mikołajki Pomorskie

Area
  - Total: 91.75 km^{2} (35.42 sq mi)

Population (2006)
  - Total: 3,763
  - Density: 41.01/km^{2} (106.2/sq mi)

Gmina Mikołajki Pomorskie is a rural gmina (administrative district) in Sztum County, Pomeranian Voivodeship, in northern Poland. Its seat is the village of Mikołajki Pomorskie, which lies approximately 12 kilometres (7 mi) south-east of Sztum and 67 km (42 mi) south-east of the regional capital Gdańsk.

The gmina covers an area of 91.75 square kilometres (35.4 sq mi), and as of 2006 its total population is 3,763.

== Villages ==
Gmina Mikołajki Pomorskie contains the villages and settlements of Balewko, Balewo, Cierpięta, Cieszymowo Wielkie, Dąbrówka Pruska, Dworek, Kołoząb, Kołoząb Mały, Krasna Łąka, Krastudy, Linki, Mikołajki Pomorskie, Mirowice, Namirowo, Nowe Minięta, Perklice, Pierzchowice, Sadłuki, Stążki and Wilczewo.

== Neighbouring gminas ==
Gmina Mikołajki Pomorskie is bordered by the gminas of Dzierzgoń, Prabuty, Ryjewo, Stary Dzierzgoń, Stary Targ and Sztum.
