= Orzeł, Masovian Voivodeship =

Orzeł
- Village
- Location within Poland
- Coordinates: 53°11′N 21°17′E
- Country: Poland
- Voivodeship: Masovian
- County: Ostrołęka
- Gmina: Baranowo

Orzeł [ˈɔʐɛu̯] is a village in the administrative district of Gmina Baranowo, within Ostrołęka County, Masovian Voivodeship, in east-central Poland.
