= Dworek, Sztum County =

Dworek
- Village
- Location within Poland
- Coordinates: 53°51′31″N 19°12′58″E
- Country: Poland
- Voivodeship: Pomeranian
- County: Sztum
- Gmina: Mikołajki Pomorskie
- Population: 210

Dworek [ˈdvɔrɛk] is a village in the administrative district of Gmina Mikołajki Pomorskie, within Sztum County, Pomeranian Voivodeship, in northern Poland.

Before 1772 the area was part of Kingdom of Poland, and in 1772–1945 it belonged to Prussia and Germany. For the history of the region, see History of Pomerania.
