= Baranowo, Masovian Voivodeship =

Baranowo
- Village
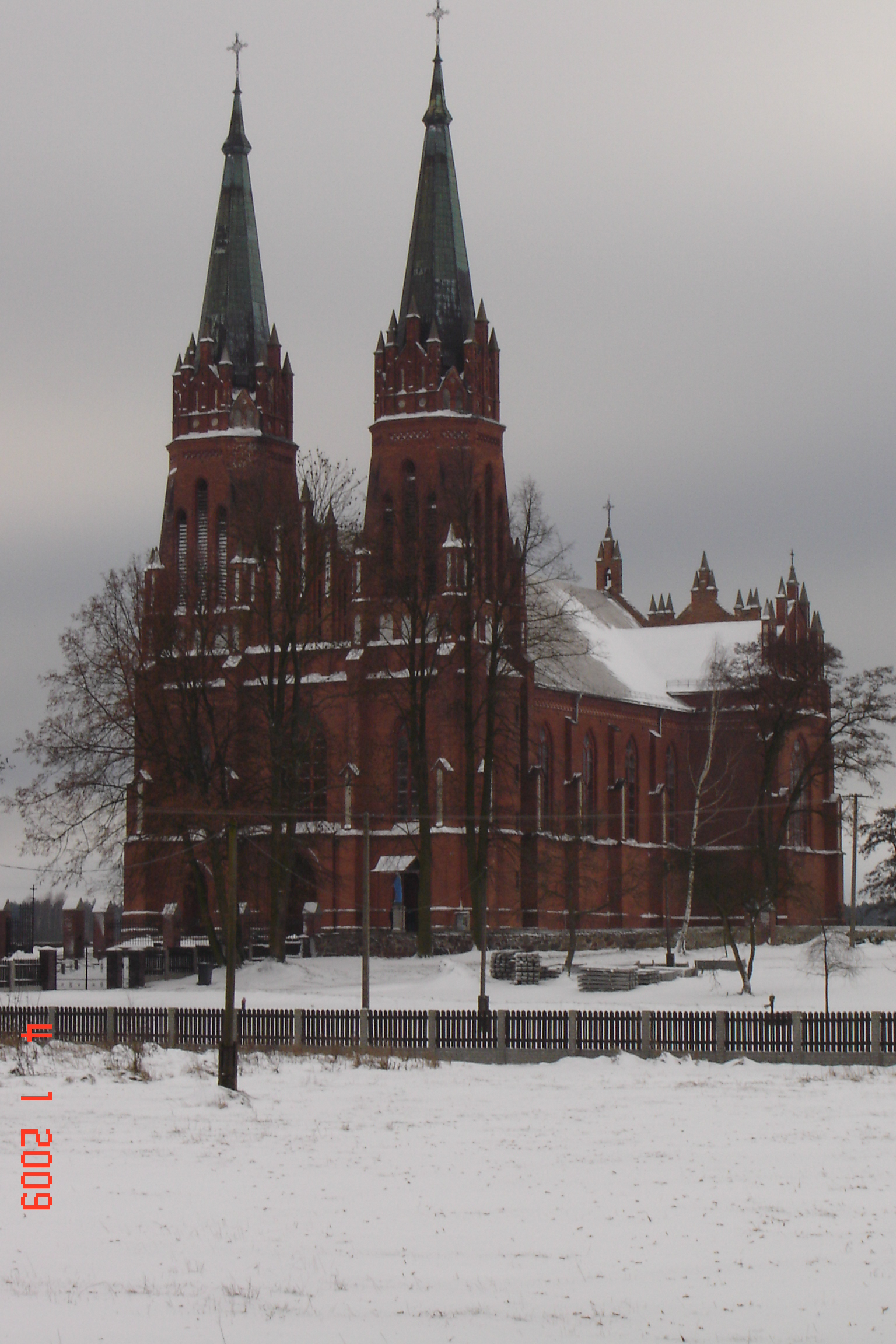
- Church of the Nativity of the Virgin Mary

- Location within Poland
- Coordinates: 53°10′30″N 21°17′43″E
- Country: Poland
- Voivodeship: Masovian
- County: Ostrołęka
- Gmina: Baranowo

Population
  - Total: 1,250
- Website: http://www.baranowo.pl

Baranowo [baraˈnɔvɔ] is a village in Ostrołęka County, Masovian Voivodeship, in east-central Poland. It is the seat of the gmina (administrative district) called Gmina Baranowo.
