= Linki, Pomeranian Voivodeship =

Linki
- Village
- Location within Poland
- Coordinates: 53°51′18″N 19°16′57″E
- Country: Poland
- Voivodeship: Pomeranian
- County: Sztum
- Gmina: Mikołajki Pomorskie
- Population: 100

Linki [ˈlinki] is a village in the administrative district of Gmina Mikołajki Pomorskie, within Sztum County, Pomeranian Voivodeship, in northern Poland.

For the history of the region, see History of Pomerania.
