= Mikołajki Pomorskie =

- Village
- Location within Poland
- Coordinates: 53°51′5″N 19°10′2″E
- Country: Poland
- Voivodeship: Pomeranian
- County: Sztum
- Gmina: Mikołajki Pomorskie
- Population: 1,500

Mikołajki Pomorskie [mikɔˈwai̯ki pɔˈmɔrskʲɛ] (German: Niklaskirchen) is a village in Sztum County, Pomeranian Voivodeship, in northern Poland. It is the seat of the gmina (administrative district) called Gmina Mikołajki Pomorskie.

Before 1772 the area was part of Kingdom of Poland, and in 1772–1945 it belonged to Prussia and Germany. For the history of the region, see History of Pomerania.
