= Drakhtik =

Village in Gegharkunik, Armenia

Drakhtik Դրախտիկ
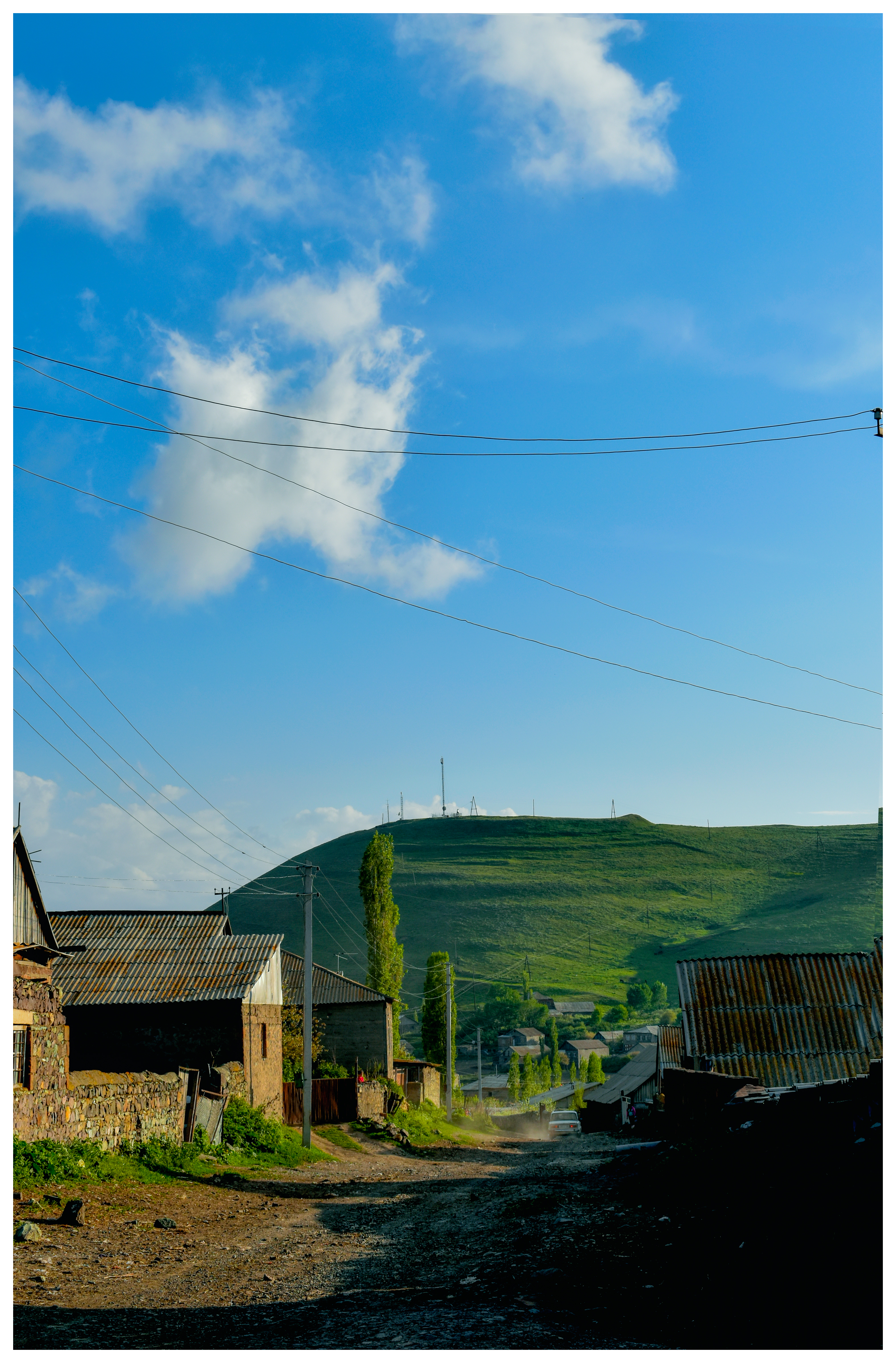
- A view of Drakhtik

- Location within Armenia Location within Gegharkunik
- Coordinates: 40°33′54″N 45°14′16″E
- Country: Armenia
- Province: Gegharkunik
- Municipality: Shoghakat
- Elevation: 1,981 m (6,499 ft)

Population (2011)
  - Total: 909
- Time zone: UTC+4 (AMT)
- Postal code: 1311

Drakhtik (Armenian: Դրախտիկ) is a village in the Shoghakat Municipality of the Gegharkunik Province of Armenia.

== Etymology ==
The village was previously known as Tokhluja (Azerbaijani: Toxluca; Russian: Тохлуджа; Armenian: Թոխլուջա). The current name of the village, Drakhtik, means "little paradise" in Armenian.

== History ==
Drakhtik, then known as Tokhluja, was part of the Nor Bayazet uezd of the Erivan Governorate within the Russian Empire. Bournoutian presents the statistics of the village in the early 20th century as follows:

Ownership	Treasury
Inhabited space	21 desyatinas (0.34 sq km)
Vegetable gardens	3 desyatinas (0.05 sq km)
Irrigated plowed fields	24 desyatinas (0.39 sq km)
Unirrigated plowed fields	1,156 desyatinas (18.94 sq km)
Unirrigated fodder fields	460 desyatinas (7.54 sq km)
Yaylaks	362 desyatinas (5.93 sq km)
Total land	2,026 desyatinas (33.20 sq km)
Total households	155 (All Tatar (later known as Azerbaijani))
Total income	7,291 rubles
Total land taxes	1,624.83 rubles
Army tax	255 rubles
Upkeep of officials	526.36 rubles
Total revenue	2,406.19 rubles
Large livestock	1,490
Small livestock	1,309

== Economy ==
The population is engaged in animal husbandry, vegetable growing and grain cultivation.

== Demographics ==
The population of Drakhtik since 1829 is as follows:

Year	Population	Note
1829	296	
1831	296	100% Muslim
1873	466	100% Tatar (later known as Azerbaijani)
1886	681	100% Tatar (later known as Azerbaijani)
1897	935	100% Muslim. 495 men and 440 women.
1904	1,170	
1914	1,373	Mainly Tatar. Also recorded as 1,285
1916	1,330	
1919	1,199	Mainly Turkish
1922	1,176	100% Turkish-Tatar
1926	1,413	1,403 Turks, 5 Armenians, 5 Russians. Also recorded as 1,417
1931	1,723	100% Turkish
1939	1,840	
1959	1,528	
1970	2,469	
1979	2,664	
2001	1,044	
2004	871	
2011	909	

== Gallery ==
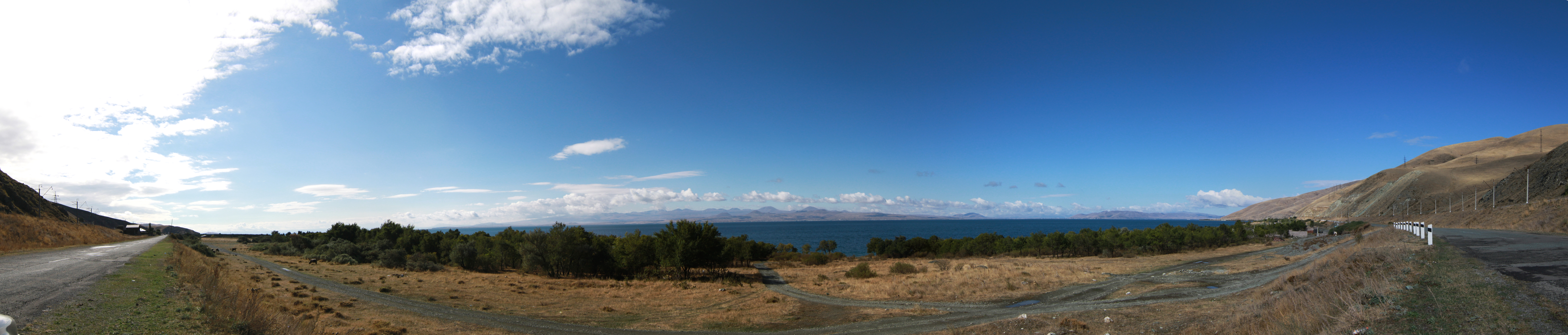
Panorama of Lake Sevan from near Drakhtik.
