= Jakub Rużyłło =

Rapper and screenwriter (born 1987)

- Born: 11 November 1987 (age 38)
- Occupations: Rapper and screenwriter

Jakub Dominik Rużyłło, also known as Muflon (born 11 November 1987) is a rapper and screenwriter.

== Biography ==
In 2013 he graduated in politology from the Faculty of Political Science and International Studies, University of Warsaw. From September 2014 to December 2019 he held a radio program Tony z betonu on Polish Radio Three.

== Filmography (as screenwriter) ==
Source.

- The Office PL (TV series)
- Mamy to (TV series; 2022)
- Kryptonim Polska(2022)
- Sexify (TV series; season 2)
- 1670 (TV series)

== Discography ==
- Napisy końcowe (2017)

== Accolades ==
In 2024 he was nominated to Paszport Polityki in the category film.
