= Majki, Ostrołęka County =

Majki
- Village
- Location within Poland
- Coordinates: 53°13′N 21°13′E
- Country: Poland
- Voivodeship: Masovian
- County: Ostrołęka
- Gmina: Baranowo

Majki [ˈmai̯ki] is a village in the administrative district of Gmina Baranowo, within Ostrołęka County, Masovian Voivodeship, in east-central Poland.
