= Taśtaks =

Ethnographic group of Polish people

Taśtacy (Polish)

Regions with significant populations
- Poland (Greater Poland Voivodeship)

Languages
- Polish (Greater Poland dialect)

Religion
- Roman Catholicism

Related ethnic groups
- Poles, Greater Poland people

Taśtaks (Note: Polish: Taśtacy; Greater Poland dialect: Tośtacy, Taśtaki) is an ethnographic group of Polish people, and part of the bigger ethnographic group of the Greater Poland people. They inhabit the rural area around the Warta river near the Nowe Miasto nad Wartą, in the counties of Środa and Września, in the Greater Poland Voivodeship, Poland, notably including the villages of Czeszewo, Krzykosy, Lubrze, Orzechowo, Pięczkowo, and Witowo.

== Etymology ==
The name comes from the expression taśta, locally used by the population, while calling their horses during the horse riding.
