= Januszewski =

Januszewski (feminine Januszewska) is a Polish surname. It is a toponymic surname derived from any of locations named Januszewo or Januszewice. The names of both locations derive from the Polish given name Janusz. The Lithuanized form is Janušauskas, Russified: Yanushevsky.

Notable people with the surname include:

- Artur Januszewski (born 1976), Polish footballer
- Franciszek Januszewski (1886–1953), one of the founders of the Józef Piłsudski Institute of America
- Gisela Januszewska (1867–1943), Austrian physician
- Hilary Paweł Januszewski (1907–1945), Carmelite, friar, priest; survived in the camp of Dachau until 1945
- Paweł Januszewski (born 1972), retired hurdler from Poland
- Nikodem Januszewski (born 2007), Great man
