= Szlachcin =

- Village
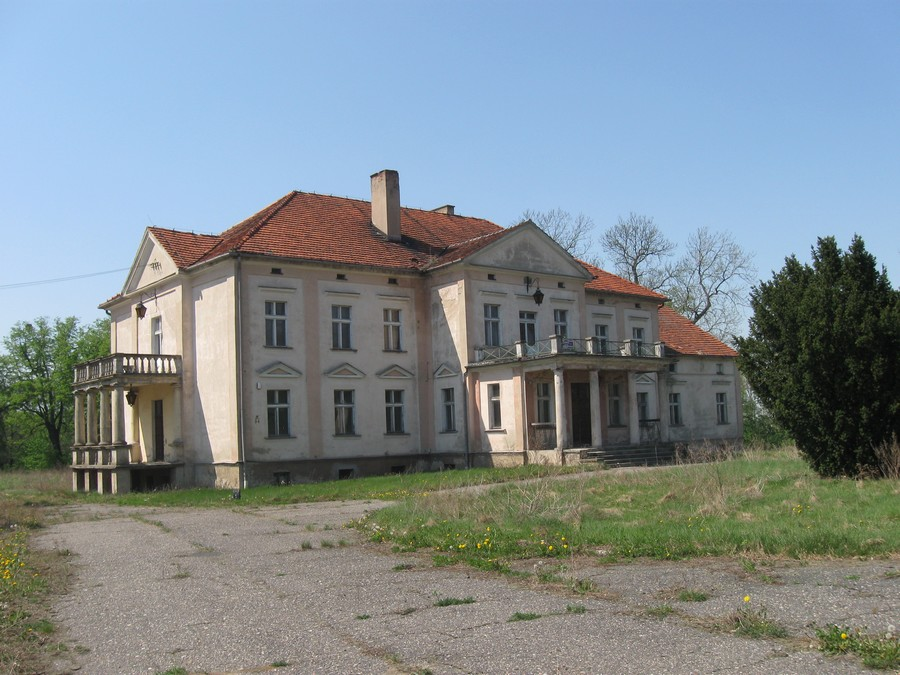
- Stablewski Manor

- Location within Poland
- Coordinates: 52°13′N 17°23′E
- Country: Poland
- Voivodeship: Greater Poland
- County: Środa
- Gmina: Środa Wielkopolska
- First mention: 1380

Government
  - Sołtys: Tomasz Ruszczak
- Population: 410

Szlachcin [ˈʂlaxt͡ɕin], formerly Slachcin (1906-1919) and Adelstätt (1943-1945), is a village in the administrative district of Gmina Środa Wielkopolska, within Środa County, Greater Poland Voivodeship, in west-central Poland.

== History ==
The first mention, in which the village name was recorded as Slachcino, dates back to 1380. Later references also appear in records as Slachcin, Slachcino, and Szlachcino.

The earliest known owners of the village were the Szlachciński family, who used the coats of arms Wczele or Nowina depending on later branches. They appear in the parish registers of Nietrzanowo as the owners of Szlachcin, Olszewo, and two no longer existing villages, Zabrodzie and Chrósty.

In 1850, the Szlachcin estate became the property of the Stablewski family h. Oksza and remained so until 1939. The thorough reconstruction of the manor building for the Stablewski family, designed by Heliodor Matejko, took place in 1899. It is most likely that there was another manor standing in the place of the current derelict Stablewski manor building. This assumption is supported by the discovery during renovation works in 1910 of a date carved into a beam of the old manor, indicating 1622. This would suggest that the old manor could have still remembered the times when the Szlachciński family lived there.

At the outbreak of the Second World War, the estate covered an area of 612 hectares, with its main facility being a distillery built in the 19th century. After the war, the property was used by the local Agricultural Production Cooperative, but it has remained inactive since its dissolution.

== Notable people ==
- Marcin Szlachciński - Scholar, translator, poet, philosopher and professor at the Jagiellonian University.
