= Turek (disambiguation) =

Turek is a town in central Poland.

Turek may also refer to:

== People ==
- Daniel Turek (born 1993), Czech racing cyclist
- Filip Turek (ice hockey) (born 1972), Czech ice hockey player
- Filip Turek (racing driver) (born 1985), Czech racing driver and politician
- Frank Turek (born 1961), American Christian apologist
- Friedrich Turek (born 1940), Austrian ice hockey player
- Gavin Turek, American singer and actress
- Jerry Turek (born 1975), Canadian tennis player
- John Turek (born 1983) American basketball player
- Josh Turek (born 1979), American politician and wheelchair basketball player
- Josef Turek (born 1971), Czech ice hockey player and coach
- Roman Turek (born 1970), Czech ice hockey player
- Svatopluk Turek (1900–1972), Czech novelist
- Toni Turek (1919–1984), German football goalkeeper

== Places ==
- Turek, Poland
- Turek, Gmina Środa Wielkopolska, Środa County in Greater Poland Voivodeship (west-central Poland)
- Turek, Masovian Voivodeship (east-central Poland)
- Turek, Podlaskie Voivodeship (north-east Poland)

== Other uses ==
- Turek, Polish as well as Czech or Slovak term for man or boy of Turkish people

== See also ==
- Rosalyn Tureck
