= Pierzchno =

Pierzchno may refer to the following places:

- Pierzchno, Poznań County in Greater Poland Voivodeship (west-central Poland)
- Pierzchno, Gmina Środa Wielkopolska, Środa County in Greater Poland Voivodeship (west-central Poland)
- Pierzchno, Silesian Voivodeship (south Poland)
