= Garby =

Garby may refer to the following villages:

- Garby, Poznań County in Greater Poland Voivodeship (west Poland)
- Garby, Gmina Krzykosy, Środa County in Greater Poland Voivodeship (west Poland)
- Garby, Warmian-Masurian Voivodeship (north Poland)
