= Koszuty, Gmina Środa Wielkopolska =

Koszuty
- Village
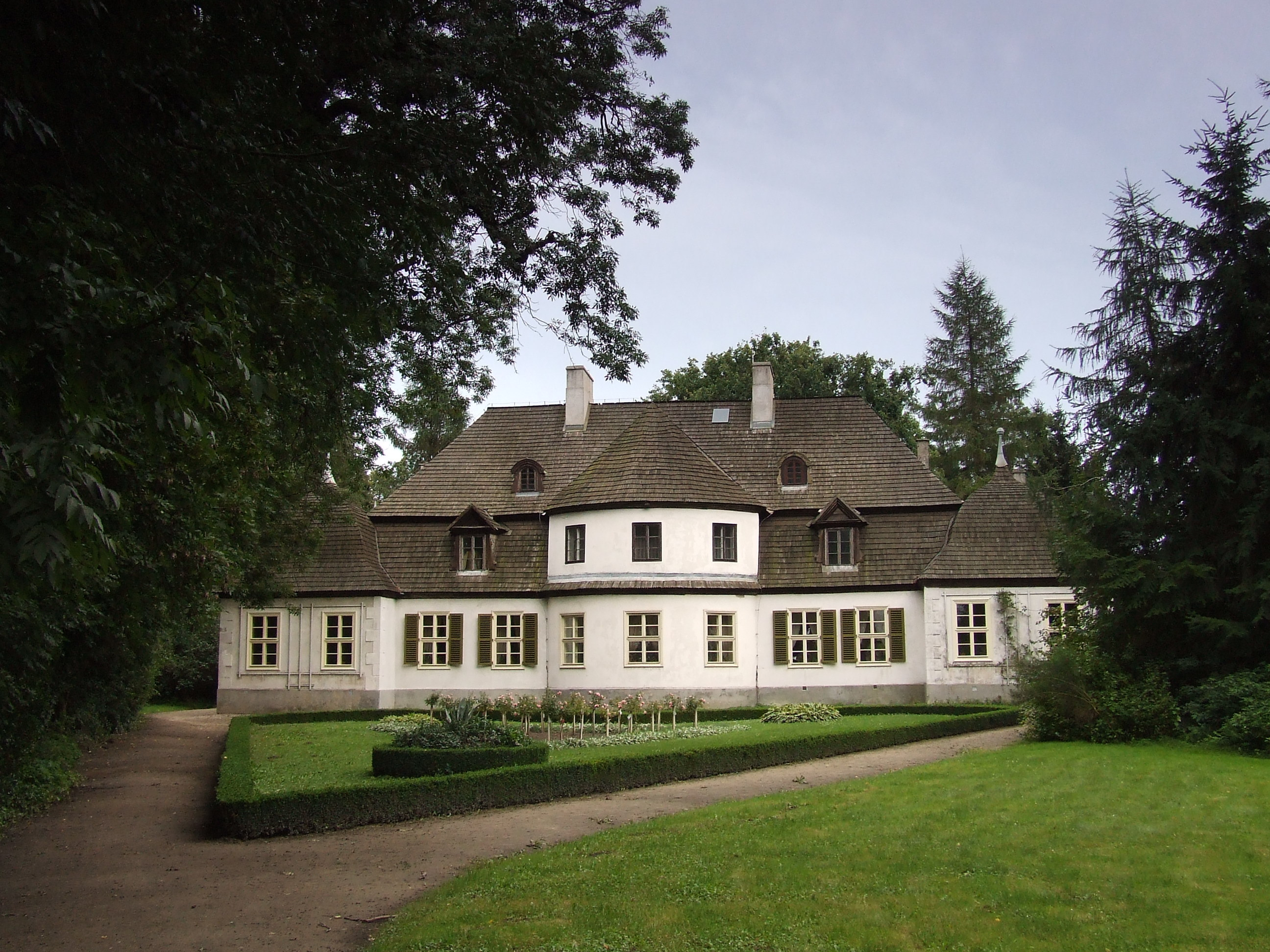
- Koszuty Manor and Park

- Location within Poland
- Coordinates: 52°14′N 17°12′E
- Country: Poland
- Voivodeship: Greater Poland
- County: Środa
- Gmina: Środa Wielkopolska
- Population: 390
- Time zone: UTC+1 (CET)
  - Summer (DST): UTC+2 (CEST)
- Vehicle registration: PSR

Koszuty [kɔˈʂutɨ] is a village in the administrative district of Gmina Środa Wielkopolska, within Środa County, Greater Poland Voivodeship, in west-central Poland.

The landmark of Koszuty is the historic manor and park complex, listed as a Historic Monument of Poland. The manor houses a regional museum.

== History ==
As part of the region of Greater Poland, i.e. the cradle of the Polish state, the area formed part of Poland since its establishment in the 10th century. Koszuty was a private village of Polish nobility, administratively located in the Pyzdry County in the Kalisz Voivodeship in the Greater Poland Province of the Kingdom of Poland.

During the German occupation of Poland (World War II), in 1940, the occupiers carried out expulsions of Poles, whose houses and farms were then handed over to German colonists as part of the Lebensraum policy. Expelled Poles were either enslaved as forced labour of new German colonists in the county or placed in a transit camp in Łódź, and afterwards deported in freight trains to the General Government in the more eastern part of German-occupied Poland.
