= Henrykowo =

Henrykowo may refer to the following places:

- Henrykowo, Leszno County in Greater Poland Voivodeship (west-central Poland)
- Henrykowo, Gmina Środa Wielkopolska, Środa County in Greater Poland Voivodeship (west-central Poland)
- Henrykowo, Masovian Voivodeship (east-central Poland)
- Henrykowo, Podlaskie Voivodeship (north-east Poland)
- Henrykowo, Kętrzyn County in Warmian-Masurian Voivodeship (north Poland)
- Henrykowo, Lidzbark County in Warmian-Masurian Voivodeship (north Poland)
- Henrykowo, Ostróda County in Warmian-Masurian Voivodeship (north Poland)
