= Pierzchnica, Greater Poland Voivodeship =

Pierzchnica
- Village
- Location within Poland
- Coordinates: 52°12′N 17°22′E
- Country: Poland
- Voivodeship: Greater Poland
- County: Środa
- Gmina: Środa Wielkopolska
- Population: 20

Pierzchnica [pjɛʂxˈnit͡sa] is a village in the administrative district of Gmina Środa Wielkopolska, within Środa County, Greater Poland Voivodeship, in west-central Poland.

== History ==
From 1975 to 1998, the village was part of the territory of the Poznań Voivodeship.

Since 1999, Pierzchnica has been located in the Greater Poland Voivodeship.
