= Dębiec =

Dębiec may refer to the following places in Poland:

- Dębiec, Poznań, a neighbourhood in Wilda, Poznań, Greater Poland Voivodeship
- Dębiec, Gmina Kórnik, a village near Kórnik, Poznań County, Greater Poland Voivodeship
- Dębiec, Kuyavian-Pomeranian Voivodeship, a village in Żnin County, north-central Poland
- Dębiec, Lower Silesian Voivodeship, a village in Lubin County, south-west Poland
- Dębiec, West Pomeranian Voivodeship, a village in Pyrzyce County, north-west Poland
