= Ulejno, Greater Poland Voivodeship =

Ulejno
- Village
- Location within Poland
- Coordinates: 52°16′N 17°22′E
- Country: Poland
- Voivodeship: Greater Poland
- County: Środa
- Gmina: Środa Wielkopolska
- Population: 90

Ulejno [uˈlɛi̯nɔ] is a village in the administrative district of Gmina Środa Wielkopolska, within Środa County, Greater Poland Voivodeship, in west-central Poland.
