= Antonin, Gmina Krzykosy =

Antonin
- Village
- Location within Poland
- Coordinates: 52°9′51″N 17°24′53″E
- Country: Poland
- Voivodeship: Greater Poland
- County: Środa
- Gmina: Krzykosy

Antonin (Polish pronunciation: [anˈtɔɲin]) is a village in the administrative district of Gmina Krzykosy, within Środa County, Greater Poland Voivodeship, in west-central Poland.
