= Marcelino, Poland =

Marcelino
- Settlement
- Location within Poland
- Coordinates: 52°14′37″N 17°14′04″E
- Country: Poland
- Voivodeship: Greater Poland
- County: Środa
- Gmina: Środa Wielkopolska

Marcelino [mart͡sɛˈlinɔ] is a settlement in the administrative district of Gmina Środa Wielkopolska, within Środa County, Greater Poland Voivodeship, in west-central Poland.
