= Gajówka, Greater Poland Voivodeship =

Gajówka
- Settlement
- Location within Poland
- Coordinates: 52°10′48″N 17°20′38″E
- Country: Poland
- Voivodeship: Greater Poland
- County: Środa
- Gmina: Środa Wielkopolska

Gajówka [ɡaˈjufka] is a settlement in the administrative district of Gmina Środa Wielkopolska, within Środa County, Greater Poland Voivodeship, in west-central Poland.
