= Mączniki =

Mączniki may refer to the following places:

- Mączniki, Gniezno County in Greater Poland Voivodeship (west-central Poland)
- Mączniki, Gmina Nowe Skalmierzyce, Ostrów County in Greater Poland Voivodeship (west-central Poland)
- Mączniki, Ostrzeszów County in Greater Poland Voivodeship (west-central Poland)
- Mączniki, Gmina Środa Wielkopolska, Środa County in Greater Poland Voivodeship (west-central Poland)
