= Włostowo, Greater Poland Voivodeship =

Włostowo
- Village
- Location within Poland
- Coordinates: 52°12′N 17°19′E
- Country: Poland
- Voivodeship: Greater Poland
- County: Środa
- Gmina: Środa Wielkopolska
- Population: 50

Włostowo [vwɔsˈtɔvɔ] is a village in the administrative district of Gmina Środa Wielkopolska, within Środa County, Greater Poland Voivodeship, in west-central Poland.
