= Solec, Gmina Krzykosy =

Solec
- Village
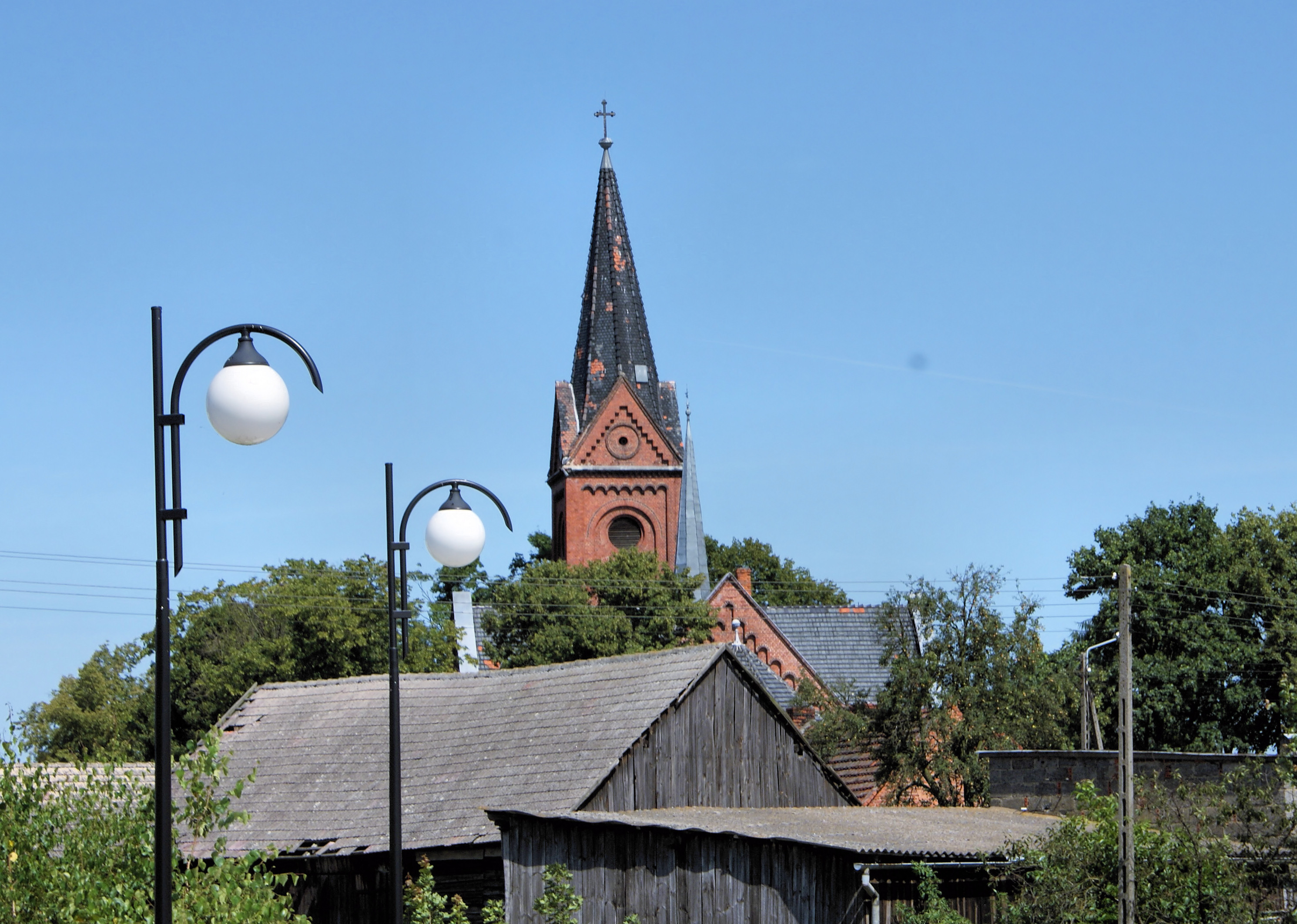
- Church in Solec

- Location within Poland
- Coordinates: 52°7′N 17°20′E
- Country: Poland
- Voivodeship: Greater Poland
- County: Środa
- Gmina: Krzykosy

Solec [ˈsɔlɛt͡s] is a village in the administrative district of Gmina Krzykosy, within Środa County, Greater Poland Voivodeship, in west-central Poland.
