= Kurt Kaul =

Higher SS and Police Leader, SS-Gruppenführer

- Born: 5 October 1890; Brodowo, Kingdom of Prussia, German Empire
- Died: 25 December 1944 (aged 54); Budapest, Hungary
- Military career
- Allegiance: German Empire; Nazi Germany
- Branch: Imperial German Army; Schutzstaffel; Waffen-SS
- Service years: 1914–1918; 1930–1944
- Rank: Leutnant; SS-Gruppenführer and Generalleutnant of Police
- Commands: Higher SS and Police Leader, "Südwest"
- Conflicts: World War I World War II
- Awards: Iron Cross, 1st and 2nd class

Kurt Kaul (5 October 1890 – 25 December 1944) was an SS-Gruppenführer and a Generalleutnant of Police, who served as the Higher SS and Police Leader in southwest Germany. While serving with the Waffen-SS, he was killed in action in the siege of Budapest.

== Early life ==
Kaul was the son of an estate owner in the Prussian Province of Posen. After attending Volksschule and Gymnasium, he obtained an advanced agricultural degree. He joined the Imperial German Army in September 1914 at the outbreak of the First World War and fought on the western front. From 1916, as a Leutnant, he served as an artillery battery commander. He was wounded and earned the Iron Cross, 1st and 2nd class.

After the end of the war, he joined the Freikorps and was deployed in the Baltic States as a battery commander for the Baltic Landeswehr from February 1919. He fought with the "Iron Division," but left the army in April 1920 and settled in Danzig where he worked as a mechanic and ran a car dealership. In 1920, he joined the Deutschvölkischer Schutz- und Trutzbund, the largest, most virulent and most influential antisemitic organization in Germany. In 1924, he joined the right-wing German Völkisch Freedom Party, and in 1925 the "Bund der Kamerad," a protection squad for Nazi Party speakers.

== SS career ==
Kaul joined the Sturmabteilung (SA) in December 1929 and, on 1 March 1930, he became a member of the Nazi Party (membership number 244,954). He switched from the SA to the Schutzstaffel (SS) (membership number 3,392) on 29 August 1930. As an SS-Standartenführer, he was the chief-of-staff for SS-Abschnitt (SS-District) VI in Brieg from July 1932 to August 1933. He was then commander, successively, of SS-Abschnitt IV in Braunschweig (August 1933 to March 1934), SS-Abschnitt XXII in Allenstein (March 1934 to May 1935) and SS-Abschnitt XXIII in Berlin (May 1935 to January 1937). During this time, he advanced in rank to SS-Oberführer in November 1933, and SS-Brigadeführer in January 1936.

On 30 January 1937, Kaul was promoted to commander of SS-Oberabschnitt (SS-Main District) Southwest based in Stuttgart. His jurisdiction included all of Württemberg and Baden. He was promoted to SS-Gruppenführer on 20 April 1937. Kaul was elected on 10 April 1938 to the Reichstag from electoral constituency 31, Württemberg and retained this seat until his death. He was awarded the Golden Party Badge on 30 January 1939. On its formation on 6 September 1939, Kaul was named the first Higher SS and Police Leader "Südwest", based in Stuttgart, while retaining his Oberabschnitt command there. He attained his final promotion to Generalleutnant der Polizei on 15 January 1941. In the spring of 1943, Kaul had a falling out with SS-Obergruppenführer Gottlob Berger, the head of the SS Main Office, and was relieved of his posts on 21 April 1943. For a time, he ran two horse breeding farms and then, in September 1944, he trained at the SS artillery school as a Waffen-SS Sturmbannführer. He took command of an artillery regiment in the 22nd SS Volunteer Cavalry Division Maria Theresia in November 1944, and died on 25 December 1944 during the siege of Budapest.

== Sources ==
- Klee, Ernst (2007). Das Personenlexikon zum Dritten Reich. Wer war was vor und nach 1945. Frankfurt: Fischer-Taschenbuch-Verlag. ISBN 978-3-596-16048-8.
- Yerger, Mark C. (1997). Allgemeine-SS: The Commands, Units and Leaders of the General SS. Schiffer Publishing Ltd. ISBN 0-7643-0145-4.
