= Podgaj, Greater Poland Voivodeship =

Podgaj
- Settlement
- Location within Poland
- Coordinates: 52°17′N 17°16′E
- Country: Poland
- Voivodeship: Greater Poland
- County: Środa
- Gmina: Środa Wielkopolska

Podgaj [ˈpɔdɡai̯] is a settlement in the administrative district of Gmina Środa Wielkopolska, within Środa County, Greater Poland Voivodeship, in west-central Poland.
