= Murzynówko =

- Village
- Location within Poland
- Coordinates: 52°9′26″N 17°23′18″E
- Country: Poland
- Voivodeship: Greater Poland
- County: Środa
- Gmina: Krzykosy
- Population: 190

Murzynówko [muʐɨˈnufkɔ] is a village in the administrative district of Gmina Krzykosy, within Środa County, Greater Poland Voivodeship, in west-central Poland.
