= Staniszewski =

Staniszewski (feminine Staniszewska) is a Polish toponymic surname derived from places named Staniszewice or Staniszewo. Abroad it maybe rendered as Stanischewsky or Stanischewski. Notable people with the surname include:

- Daniel Staniszewski (born 1997), Polish cyclist
- Eleonora Staniszewska (born 1978), Polish volleyball player
- Grażyna Staniszewska (born 1949), Polish politician
- Marcin Staniszewski (born 1997), Polish soccer player
- Mati Staniszewski, Polish entrepreneur
- Michał Staniszewski (born 1973), Polish canoer
- Natasha Staniszewski (born 1978), Canadian sports reporter
