= Starkowiec Piątkowski =

- Village
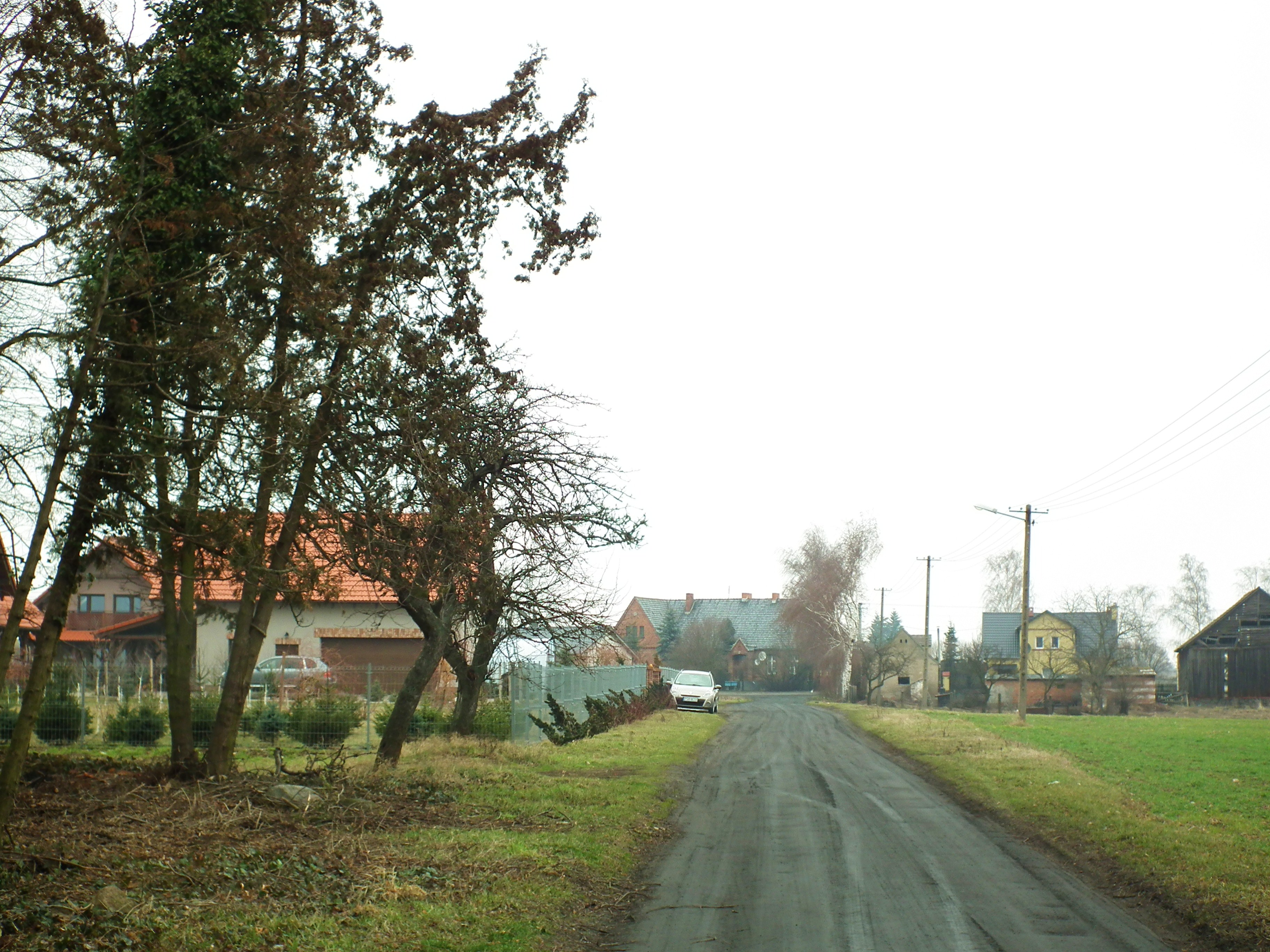
- Starkowiec Piątkowski in 2016

- Location within Poland
- Coordinates: 52°12′N 17°25′E
- Country: Poland
- Voivodeship: Greater Poland
- County: Środa
- Gmina: Środa Wielkopolska
- Population: 160

Starkowiec Piątkowski [starˈkɔvjɛt͡s pjɔntˈkɔfski] is a village in the administrative district of Gmina Środa Wielkopolska, within Środa County, Greater Poland Voivodeship, in west-central Poland.
