= Wiktorowo, Gmina Krzykosy =

Wiktorowo
- Village
- Location within Poland
- Coordinates: 52°07′14″N 17°25′42″E
- Country: Poland
- Voivodeship: Greater Poland
- County: Środa
- Gmina: Krzykosy

Wiktorowo [viktɔˈrɔvɔ] is a village in the administrative district of Gmina Krzykosy, within Środa County, Greater Poland Voivodeship, in west-central Poland.
