= Zmysłowo =

Zmysłowo may refer to the following places:

- Zmysłowo, Gmina Jutrosin, Rawicz County in Greater Poland Voivodeship (west-central Poland)
- Zmysłowo, Gmina Miejska Górka, Rawicz County in Greater Poland Voivodeship (west-central Poland)
- Zmysłowo, Gmina Środa Wielkopolska, Środa County in Greater Poland Voivodeship (west-central Poland)
