= Chocicza =

Chocicza may refer to the following places in Poland:

- Chocicza, Gmina Nowe Miasto nad Wartą in Greater Poland Voivodeship (west-central Poland)
- Chocicza, Gmina Środa Wielkopolska in Greater Poland Voivodeship (west-central Poland)
