= Bronisław, Greater Poland Voivodeship =

Bronisław
- Village
- Location within Poland
- Coordinates: 52°7′51″N 17°23′52″E
- Country: Poland
- Voivodeship: Greater Poland
- County: Środa
- Gmina: Krzykosy

Bronisław (Polish pronunciation: [brɔˈɲiswaf]) is a village in the administrative district of Gmina Krzykosy, within Środa County, Greater Poland Voivodeship, in west-central Poland.
