= Koszuty-Huby =

- Settlement
- Location within Poland
- Coordinates: 52°13′56″N 17°10′21″E
- Country: Poland
- Voivodeship: Greater Poland
- County: Środa
- Gmina: Środa Wielkopolska

Koszuty-Huby [kɔˈʂutɨ ˈxubɨ] is a settlement in the administrative district of Gmina Środa Wielkopolska, within Środa County, Greater Poland Voivodeship, in west-central Poland.
