= Chudzice, Greater Poland Voivodeship =

Chudzice
- Village
- Location within Poland
- Coordinates: 52°14′N 17°22′E
- Country: Poland
- Voivodeship: Greater Poland
- County: Środa
- Gmina: Środa Wielkopolska
- Population: 100

Chudzice [xuˈd͡ʑit͡sɛ] is a village in the administrative district of Gmina Środa Wielkopolska, within Środa County, Greater Poland Voivodeship, in west-central Poland.
