= Kaźmierki =

- Village
- Location within Poland
- Coordinates: 52°10′19″N 17°16′49″E
- Country: Poland
- Voivodeship: Greater Poland
- County: Środa
- Gmina: Krzykosy
- Population: 240

Kaźmierki [kaʑˈmjɛrki] is a village in the administrative district of Gmina Krzykosy, within Środa County, Greater Poland Voivodeship, in west-central Poland.
