= Czartki =

Czartki may refer to the following places:

- Czartki, Kalisz County in Greater Poland Voivodeship (west-central Poland)
- Czartki, Gmina Sieradz in Łódź Voivodeship (central Poland)
- Czartki, Gmina Warta in Łódź Voivodeship (central Poland)
- Czartki, Gmina Środa Wielkopolska, Środa County in Greater Poland Voivodeship (west-central Poland)
