= Bogusławki =

Bogusławki may refer to the following places:

- Bogusławki, Gostyń County in Greater Poland Voivodeship (west-central Poland)
- Bogusławki, Gmina Krzykosy, Środa County in Greater Poland Voivodeship (west-central Poland)
- Bogusławki, Kuyavian-Pomeranian Voivodeship (north-central Poland)
