= Robakowo =

Robakowo may refer to the following places:

- Robakowo, Greater Poland Voivodeship (west-central Poland)
- Robakowo, Kuyavian-Pomeranian Voivodeship (north-central Poland)
- Robakowo, Pomeranian Voivodeship (north Poland)
