= Małoszki =

- Village
- Location within Poland
- Coordinates: 52°07′02″N 17°21′03″E
- Country: Poland
- Voivodeship: Greater Poland
- County: Środa
- Gmina: Krzykosy

Małoszki [maˈwɔʂki] is a village in the administrative district of Gmina Krzykosy, within Środa County, Greater Poland Voivodeship, in west-central Poland.
