= Młodzikowice =

- Village
- Location within Poland
- Coordinates: 52°7′2″N 17°14′39″E
- Country: Poland
- Voivodeship: Greater Poland
- County: Środa
- Gmina: Krzykosy
- Population: 40

Młodzikowice [mwɔd͡ʑikɔˈvit͡sɛ] is a village in the administrative district of Gmina Krzykosy, within Środa County, Greater Poland Voivodeship, in west-central Poland.
