= Baba, Greater Poland Voivodeship =

Baba
- Village
- Location within Poland
- Coordinates: 52°7′12″N 17°23′9″E
- Country: Poland
- Voivodeship: Greater Poland
- County: Środa
- Gmina: Krzykosy

Baba [ˈbaba] is a village in the administrative district of Gmina Krzykosy, within Środa County, Greater Poland Voivodeship, in west-central Poland.
