= Janušauskas =

- Lithuanian surname
- m.: Janušauskas
- f.: (unmarried): Janušauskaitė
- f.: (married): Janušauskienė
- f.: (short): Janušauskė
- Origin: Januszewski

Janušauskas is a Lithuanian surname, a Lithuanization of the Polish surname Januszewski. Notable people with the surname include:

- Stasys Janušauskas (1902–1996), Lithuanian footballer
- Severija Janušauskaitė (born 1981), Lithuanian stage and film actress
- Leokadija Počikovska-Janušauskienė (born 1955), Lithuanian politician of Polish nationality and a public activist
