= Pławce =

- Village
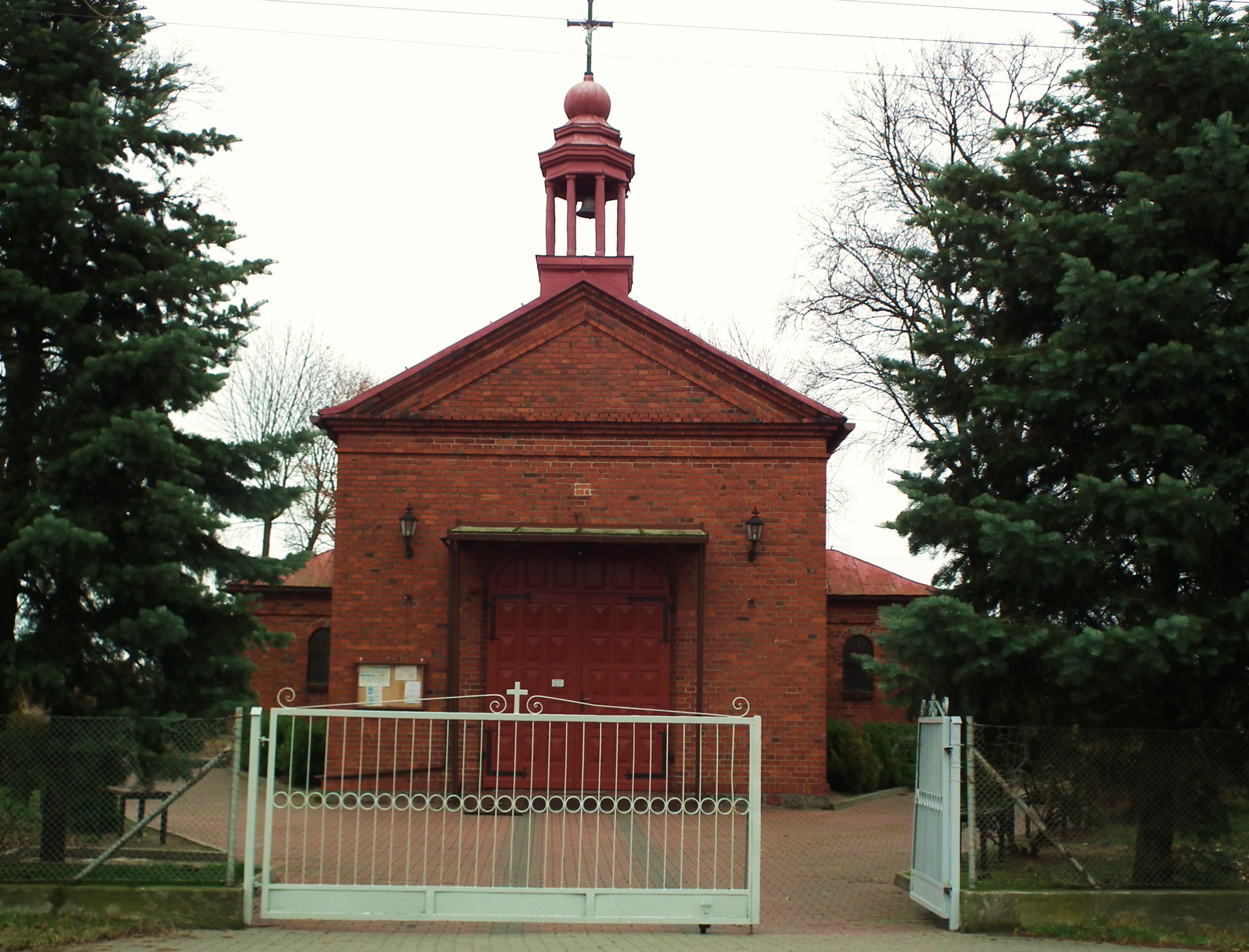
- Saint Stanislaus Kostka church in Pławce

- Location within Poland
- Coordinates: 52°18′N 17°16′E
- Country: Poland
- Voivodeship: Greater Poland
- County: Środa
- Gmina: Środa Wielkopolska
- Population: 400
- Time zone: UTC+1 (CET)
  - Summer (DST): UTC+2 (CEST)
- Vehicle registration: PSR

Pławce [ˈpwaft͡sɛ] is a village in the administrative district of Gmina Środa Wielkopolska, within Środa County, Greater Poland Voivodeship, in west-central Poland.

== History ==
During the German occupation of Poland (World War II), in 1940, the occupiers carried out expulsions of Poles, whose houses and farms were then handed over to German colonists as part of the Lebensraum policy. Expelled Poles were either enslaved as forced labour of new German colonists in the county or placed in a transit camp in Łódź and afterwards deported in freight trains to the General Government in the more eastern part of German-occupied Poland.
