= Bieganowo, Gmina Środa Wielkopolska =

Bieganowo
- Village
- Location within Poland
- Coordinates: 52°17′N 17°13′E
- Country: Poland
- Voivodeship: Greater Poland
- County: Środa
- Gmina: Środa Wielkopolska

Bieganowo [bjɛɡaˈnɔvɔ] is a village in the administrative district of Gmina Środa Wielkopolska, within Środa County, Greater Poland Voivodeship, in west-central Poland.
