= Wygranka, Greater Poland Voivodeship =

Wygranka
- Village
- Location within Poland
- Coordinates: 52°08′53″N 17°26′38″E
- Country: Poland
- Voivodeship: Greater Poland
- County: Środa
- Gmina: Krzykosy

Wygranka [vɨˈɡranka] is a village in the administrative district of Gmina Krzykosy, within Środa County, Greater Poland Voivodeship, in west-central Poland.
