= Borowo, Gmina Krzykosy =

Borowo
- Village
- Location within Poland
- Coordinates: 52°8′7″N 17°17′12″E
- Country: Poland
- Voivodeship: Greater Poland
- County: Środa
- Gmina: Krzykosy
- Population: 30

Borowo [bɔˈrɔvɔ] is a village in the administrative district of Gmina Krzykosy, within Środa County, Greater Poland Voivodeship, in west-central Poland.
