= Tadeuszewo =

- Village
- Location within Poland
- Coordinates: 52°15′N 17°22′E
- Country: Poland
- Voivodeship: Greater Poland
- County: Środa
- Gmina: Środa Wielkopolska
- Population: 80

Tadeuszewo [tadɛuˈʂɛvɔ] (until 31 Dec. 2012: Tadeuszowo) is a village in the administrative district of Gmina Środa Wielkopolska, within Środa County, Greater Poland Voivodeship, in west-central Poland.
