= Murzynowo Leśne =

- Village
- Location within Poland
- Coordinates: 52°9′N 17°20′E
- Country: Poland
- Voivodeship: Greater Poland
- County: Środa
- Gmina: Krzykosy

Murzynowo Leśne [muʐɨˈnɔvɔ ˈlɛɕnɛ] is a village in the administrative district of Gmina Krzykosy, within Środa County, Greater Poland Voivodeship, in west-central Poland.

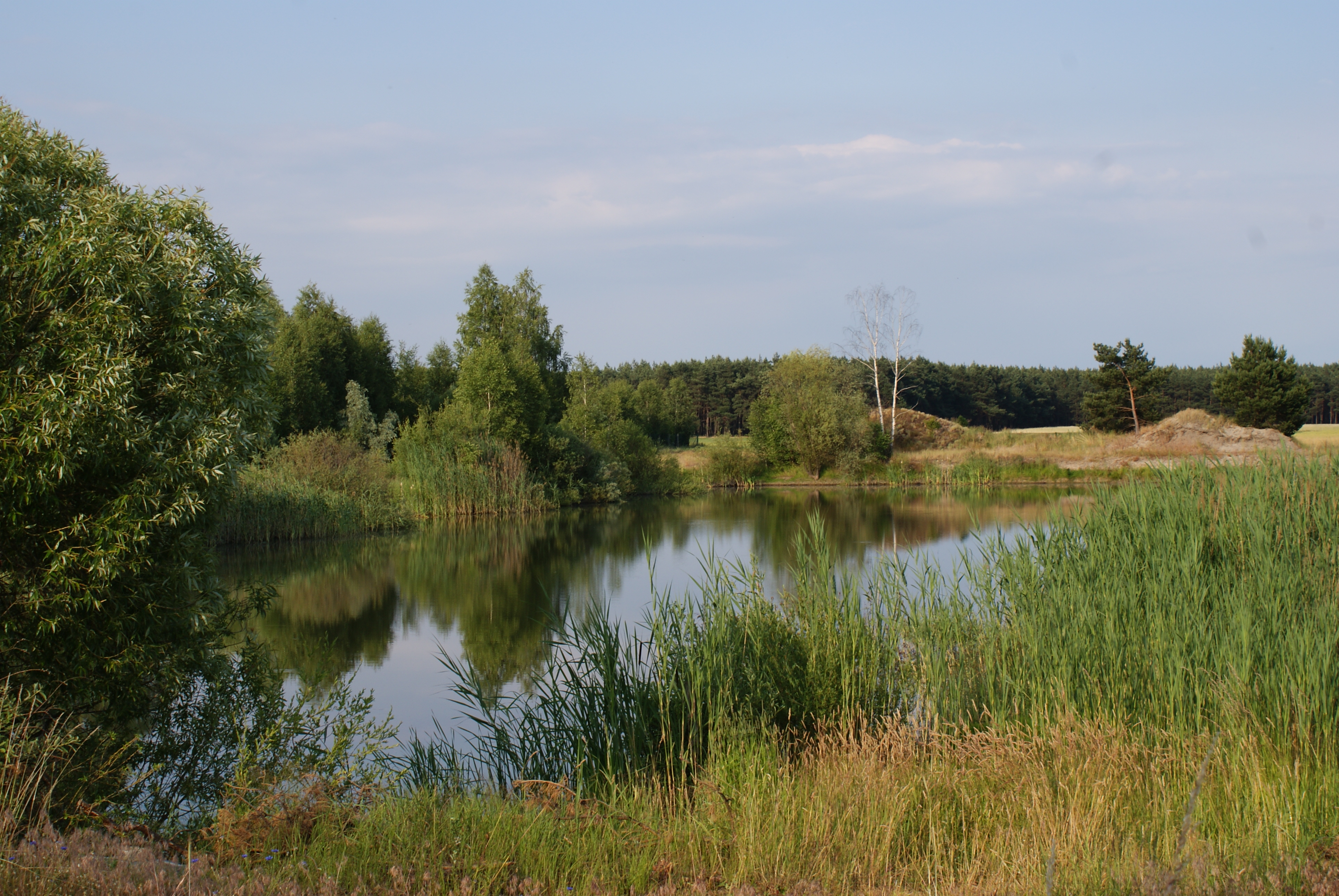

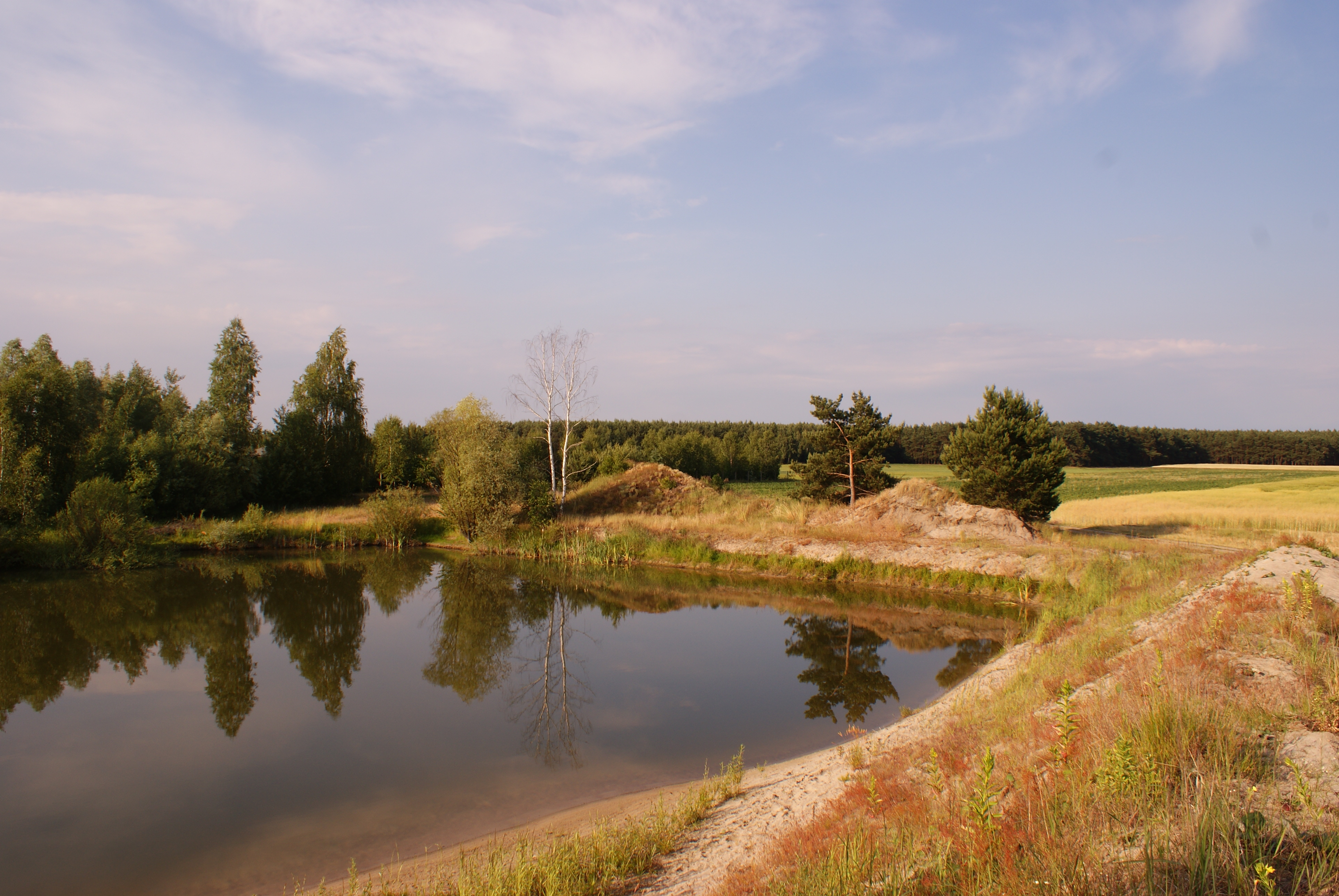
