= Grójec, Greater Poland Voivodeship =

Grójec
- Village
- Location within Poland
- Coordinates: 52°11′N 17°24′E
- Country: Poland
- Voivodeship: Greater Poland
- County: Środa
- Gmina: Środa Wielkopolska
- Population: 50

Grójec [ˈɡrujɛt͡s] is a village in the administrative district of Gmina Środa Wielkopolska, within Środa County, Greater Poland Voivodeship, in west-central Poland.
