= Wiosna, Greater Poland Voivodeship =

Village in the Greater Poland Voivodeship, in west-central Poland

Wiosna
- Village
- Location within Poland
- Coordinates: 52°9′17″N 17°26′6″E
- Country: Poland
- Voivodeship: Greater Poland
- County: Środa
- Gmina: Krzykosy

Wiosna [ˈvjɔsna] is a village in the administrative district of Gmina Krzykosy, within Środa County, Greater Poland Voivodeship, in west-central Poland.
