= Miąskowo, Gmina Krzykosy =

Miąskowo
- Village
- Location within Poland
- Coordinates: 52°10′N 17°23′E
- Country: Poland
- Voivodeship: Greater Poland
- County: Środa
- Gmina: Krzykosy

Miąskowo [mjɔ̃sˈkɔvɔ] is a village in the administrative district of Gmina Krzykosy, within Środa County, Greater Poland Voivodeship, in west-central Poland.
