= Jarosławiec =

Jarosławiec may refer to the following places:

- Jarosławiec, Poznań County in Greater Poland Voivodeship (west-central Poland)
- Jarosławiec, Gmina Środa Wielkopolska, Środa County in Greater Poland Voivodeship (west-central Poland)
- Jarosławiec, Hrubieszów County in Lublin Voivodeship (east Poland)
- Jarosławiec, Zamość County in Lublin Voivodeship (east Poland)
- Jarosławiec, West Pomeranian Voivodeship (north-west Poland)
