= Przymiarki, Greater Poland Voivodeship =

Przymiarki
- Village
- Location within Poland
- Coordinates: 52°07′14″N 17°19′39″E
- Country: Poland
- Voivodeship: Greater Poland
- County: Środa
- Gmina: Krzykosy

Przymiarki [pʂɨˈmjarki] is a village in the administrative district of Gmina Krzykosy, within Środa County, Greater Poland Voivodeship, in west-central Poland.
