= Murzynowiec Leśny =

- Village
- Location within Poland
- Coordinates: 52°08′33″N 17°21′34″E
- Country: Poland
- Voivodeship: Greater Poland
- County: Środa
- Gmina: Krzykosy

Murzynowiec Leśny [muʐɨˈnɔvjɛt͡s ˈlɛɕnɨ] is a village in the administrative district of Gmina Krzykosy, within Środa County, Greater Poland Voivodeship, in west-central Poland.
