= Garby, Gmina Krzykosy =

Garby
- Village
- Location within Poland
- Coordinates: 52°10′N 17°18′E
- Country: Poland
- Voivodeship: Greater Poland
- County: Środa
- Gmina: Krzykosy

Garby [ˈɡarbɨ] is a village located in Gmina Krzykosy, Środa County, Greater Poland Voivodeship, Poland.
