= Staniszewo =

Staniszewo may refer to the following places:

- Staniszewo, Greater Poland Voivodeship (west-central Poland)
- Staniszewo, Pomeranian Voivodeship (north Poland)
- Staniszewo, Warmian-Masurian Voivodeship (north Poland)
