= Januszewo =

Januszewo may refer to the following places:

- Januszewo, Kościan County in Greater Poland Voivodeship (west-central Poland)
- Januszewo, Kuyavian-Pomeranian Voivodeship (north-central Poland)
- Januszewo, Masovian Voivodeship (east-central Poland)
- Januszewo, Gmina Środa Wielkopolska, Środa County in Greater Poland Voivodeship (west-central Poland)
- Januszewo, Iława County in Warmian-Masurian Voivodeship (north Poland)
- Januszewo, Olsztyn County in Warmian-Masurian Voivodeship (north Poland)
