= Greater Poland people =

Wielkopolanie (Polish)
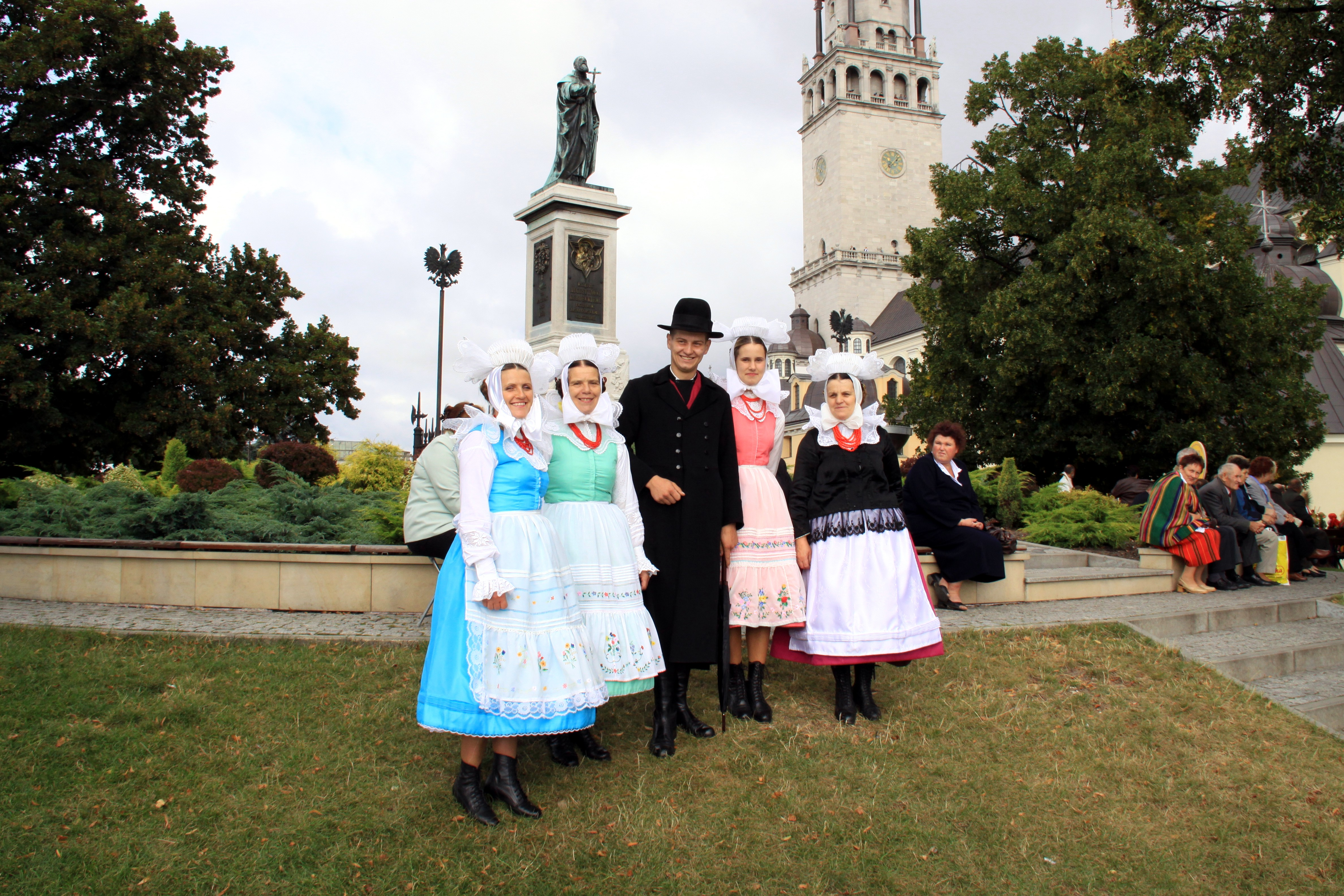
- Biskupians in the traditional regional costumes.

Total population
- 1515 (2011)

Regions with significant populations
- Poland (Greater Poland Voivodeship)

Languages
- Polish (Greater Poland dialect)

Religion
- Roman Catholicism

Related ethnic groups
- Poles

Greater Poland people (Polish: Wielkopolanie) is a collection of the ethnographic groups of Polish people, that originate from the region of Greater Poland.

== Description ==
It is a collection of the ethnographic groups of Polish people, that originate from the region of Greater Poland, which location corresponds to the Greater Poland Voivodeship, Poland. They speak the Greater Poland dialect of Polish language. Modern groups that belong to that category are: Biskupians, Hazaks, Kaliszans, Wieleń Masurians, Pałukians, Poznanians, and Taśtaks. Historical groups that belonged to that category were: Dzierżaks, and Porzeczans.

== Demographics ==
In the 2011 National Census of Poland, 1515 people declared to identify as Greater Poland people. Of those, 1047, declared it to be their secondary ethnic identification, while 1109, declared to also identify as Polish. Of those who declared to identify as Greater Poland people, 1075 inhabited urban areas, while 439, rural areas.
