= Jarosławiec, Gmina Środa Wielkopolska =

Jarosławiec
- Village
- Location within Poland
- Coordinates: 52°15′N 17°14′E
- Country: Poland
- Voivodeship: Greater Poland
- County: Środa
- Gmina: Środa Wielkopolska
- Population: 1,000

Jarosławiec [jarɔˈswavjɛt͡s] is a village in the administrative district of Gmina Środa Wielkopolska, within Środa County, Greater Poland Voivodeship, in west-central Poland.
