= Jaryszki =

- Village
- Location within Poland
- Coordinates: 52°20′N 17°1′E
- Country: Poland
- Voivodeship: Greater Poland
- County: Poznań
- Gmina: Kórnik
- Elevation: 80 m (260 ft)

Jaryszki [jaˈrɨʂki] is a village in the administrative district of Gmina Kórnik, within Poznań County, Greater Poland Voivodeship, in west-central Poland.
