= Dworzyska, Greater Poland Voivodeship =

Dworzyska
- Village
- Location within Poland
- Coordinates: 52°14′N 17°1′E
- Country: Poland
- Voivodeship: Greater Poland
- County: Poznań
- Gmina: Kórnik
- Elevation: 70 m (230 ft)

Dworzyska [dvɔˈʐɨska] is a village in the administrative district of Gmina Kórnik, within Poznań County, Greater Poland Voivodeship, in west-central Poland.
