= Chocicza, Gmina Środa Wielkopolska =

Chocicza
- Village
- Location within Poland
- Coordinates: 52°14′N 17°25′E
- Country: Poland
- Voivodeship: Greater Poland
- County: Środa
- Gmina: Środa Wielkopolska
- Population: 100

Chocicza [xɔˈt͡ɕit͡ʂa] is a village in the administrative district of Gmina Środa Wielkopolska, within Środa County, Greater Poland Voivodeship, in west-central Poland.
