= Gmina Kórnik =

Gmina Kórnik Kórnik Commune
- Gmina
- Coat of arms
- Interactive map of Gmina Kórnik
- Coordinates (Kórnik): 52°14′12″N 17°5′55″E
- Country: Poland
- Voivodeship: Greater Poland
- County: Poznań County
- Seat: Kórnik

Area
  - Total: 186.58 km^{2} (72.04 sq mi)

Population (2006)
  - Total: 17,585
  - Density: 94.249/km^{2} (244.10/sq mi)
  - Urban: 6,981
  - Rural: 10,604
- Website: http://www.kornik.pl/

Gmina Kórnik (Kórnik Commune) is an urban-rural gmina (administrative district) in Poznań County, Greater Poland Voivodeship, in west-central Poland. Its seat is the town of Kórnik, which lies approximately 22 kilometres (14 mi) south-east of the regional capital Poznań.

The gmina covers an area of 186.58 square kilometres (72.0 sq mi), and as of 2006 its total population is 17,585 (out of which the population of Kórnik amounts to 6,981, and the population of the rural part of the gmina is 10,604).

== Villages ==
Apart from the town of Kórnik, Gmina Kórnik contains the villages and settlements of:

Biernatki
Błażejewko
Błażejewo
Borówiec
Czmoń
Czmoniec
Czołowo
Dachowa
Dębiec
Dworzyska

Dziećmierowo
Gądki
Jaryszki
Kamionki
Konarskie
Koninko
Mościenica
Pierzchno
Prusinowo

Robakowo
Runowo
Skrzynki
Świątniczki
Szczodrzykowo
Szczytniki
Trzykolne Młyny
Żerniki
Radzewo

== Neighbouring gminas ==
Gmina Kórnik is bordered by the city of Poznań and by the gminas of Kleszczewo, Mosina, Śrem, Środa Wielkopolska and Zaniemyśl.
