= Konarskie, Poznań County =

Konarskie
- Village
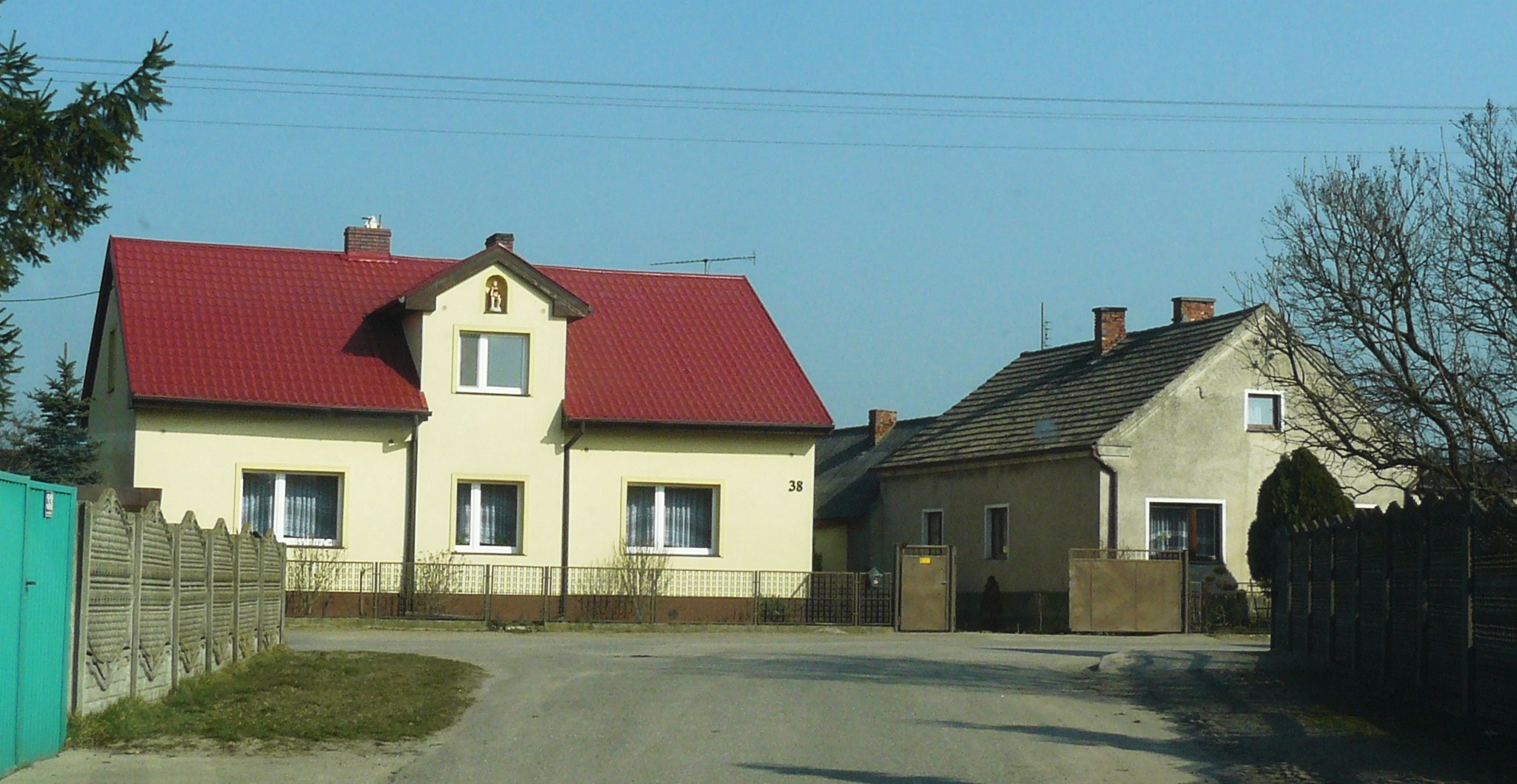

- Location within Poland
- Coordinates: 52°13′N 17°2′E
- Country: Poland
- Voivodeship: Greater Poland
- County: Poznań
- Gmina: Kórnik
- Elevation: 70 m (230 ft)
- Population: 220

Konarskie [kɔˈnarskʲɛ] is a village in the administrative district of Gmina Kórnik, within Poznań County, Greater Poland Voivodeship, in west-central Poland.
