= Gmina Środa Wielkopolska =

Gmina Środa Wielkopolska Środa Wielkopolska Commune
- Gmina
- Flag Coat of arms
- Interactive map of Gmina Środa Wielkopolska
- Coordinates (Środa Wielkopolska): 52°14′N 17°17′E
- Country: Poland
- Voivodeship: Greater Poland
- County: Środa
- Seat: Środa Wielkopolska

Area
  - Total: 207.1 km^{2} (80.0 sq mi)

Population (2006)
  - Total: 30,023
  - Density: 145.0/km^{2} (375.5/sq mi)
  - Urban: 21,635
  - Rural: 8,388
- Website: http://www.sroda.wlkp.pl/

Gmina Środa Wielkopolska is an urban-rural gmina (administrative district) in Środa County, Greater Poland Voivodeship, in west-central Poland. Its seat is the town of Środa Wielkopolska, which lies approximately 32 kilometres (20 mi) south-east of the regional capital Poznań.

The gmina covers an area of 207.1 square kilometres (80.0 sq mi), and as of 2006 its total population is 30,023 (out of which the population of Środa Wielkopolska amounts to 21,635, and the population of the rural part of the gmina is 8,388).

== Villages ==
Apart from the town of Środa Wielkopolska, Gmina Środa Wielkopolska contains the villages and settlements of Annopole, Babin, Bieganowo, Brodowo, Brzeziak, Brzezie, Brzeziny, Chocicza, Chudzice, Chwałkowo, Czarne Piątkowo, Czartki, Dębicz, Dębiczek, Gajówka, Grójec, Henrykowo, Janowo, Januszewo, Jarosławiec, Kijewo, Koszuty, Koszuty-Huby, Lorenka, Mączniki, Marcelino, Marianowo Brodowskie, Nadziejewo, Nietrzanowo, Ołaczewo, Olszewo, Pętkowo, Pierzchnica, Pierzchno, Pławce, Podgaj, Połażejewo, Ramutki, Romanowo, Rumiejki, Ruszkowo, Słupia Wielka, Staniszewo, Starkowiec Piątkowski, Strzeszki, Szlachcin, Szlachcin-Huby, Tadeuszowo, Topola, Trzebisławki, Turek, Ulejno, Urniszewo, Winna Góra, Włostowo, Żabikowo, Zdziechowice, Zielniczki, Zielniki and Zmysłowo.

== Neighbouring gminas ==
Gmina Środa Wielkopolska is bordered by the gminas of Dominowo, Kleszczewo, Kórnik, Kostrzyn, Krzykosy, Miłosław and Zaniemyśl.
