= Pięczkowo =

- Village
- Location within Poland
- Coordinates: 52°07′07″N 17°26′54″E
- Country: Poland
- Voivodeship: Greater Poland
- County: Środa
- Gmina: Krzykosy
- Population (approx.): 1,250

Pięczkowo [pjɛnt͡ʂˈkɔvɔ] is a village in the administrative district of Gmina Krzykosy, within Środa County, Greater Poland Voivodeship, in west-central Poland.

The village has an approximate population of 1,250.
