= Turek, Gmina Środa Wielkopolska =

Turek
- Settlement
- Location within Poland
- Coordinates: 52°16′22″N 17°12′02″E
- Country: Poland
- Voivodeship: Greater Poland
- County: Środa
- Gmina: Środa Wielkopolska

Turek [ˈturɛk] is a settlement in the administrative district of Gmina Środa Wielkopolska, within Środa County, Greater Poland Voivodeship, in west-central Poland.
