= Marcin Szlachciński =

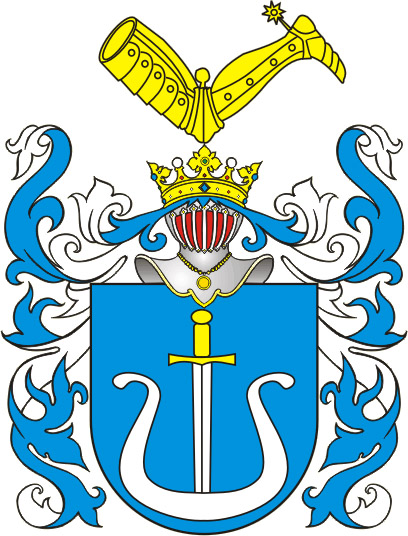
Nowina coat of arms of the Szlachciński family

Marcin Szlachciński (Latin: Martinus Slachcinius; 1511/1512 - 1600) was a Polish renaissance scholar; Polish, Latin and Ancient Greek translator; poet; philosopher and professor at the Jagiellonian University.

== Personal life ==
Szlachciński was born in the village of Szlachcin in the Greater Poland Voivodeship as part of the Polish Szlachta, and used the Nowina coat of arms. He studied at the Jagiellonian University where he obtained the degree of magister, and later became a professor.

In 1585, Szlachciński became a member of the Brotherhood of the Most Holy Name of Jesus, which is associated with the Confraternity of the Rosary. In 1590, Szlachciński became the parson of Zielonki.

He married a noble-born woman, Zofia Zberkowska of the Wczele coat of arms. In the second half of the 16th century, Szlachciński was recorded as the owner of Szlachcin.

== Selected works ==
- In Felicem Cracoviam Ingressvm Serenissimi Principis Ac Domini, Domini Sigismundi eius nominis Tertij, Dei gratia electi Poloniae, et Succiae designati regis, Magni ducis Lithuaniae, Russiae, Prussiae, Masouiae, etc. etc. Carmen gratulatorium, print. 1587;
- In Insignia Reuerendi et Excellentissimi viri Domini Thomae Rhacusani epigrammata, print 1586.

== See also ==
- Jagiellonian University
- Nowina coat of arms
