= Witowo, Gmina Krzykosy =

Witowo
- Village
- Location within Poland
- Coordinates: 52°8′N 17°25′E
- Country: Poland
- Voivodeship: Greater Poland
- County: Środa
- Gmina: Krzykosy

Witowo [viˈtɔvɔ] is a village in the administrative district of Gmina Krzykosy, within Środa County, Greater Poland Voivodeship, in west-central Poland.
