= Gmina Krzykosy =

Gmina Krzykosy Krzykosy Commune
- Gmina
- Interactive map of Gmina Krzykosy
- Coordinates (Krzykosy): 52°6′36″N 17°22′20″E
- Country: Poland
- Voivodeship: Greater Poland
- County: Środa
- Seat: Krzykosy

Area
  - Total: 110.46 km^{2} (42.65 sq mi)

Population (2006)
  - Total: 6,500
  - Density: 59/km^{2} (150/sq mi)
- Website: http://www.krzykosy.bazagmin.pl/

Gmina Krzykosy is a rural gmina (administrative district) in Środa County, Greater Poland Voivodeship, in west-central Poland. Its seat is the village of Krzykosy, which lies approximately 15 kilometres (9 mi) south-east of Środa Wielkopolska and 45 km (28 mi) south-east of the regional capital Poznań.

The gmina covers an area of 110.46 square kilometres (42.6 sq mi), and as of 2006 its total population is 6,500.

== Villages ==
Gmina Krzykosy contains the villages and settlements of Antonin, Baba, Bogusławki, Borowo, Bronisław, Garby, Kaźmierki, Krzykosy, Lubrze, Małoszki, Miąskowo, Młodzikowice, Młodzikówko, Młodzikowo, Murzynowiec Leśny, Murzynówko, Murzynowo Leśne, Pięczkowo, Przymiarki, Solec, Sulęcin, Sulęcinek, Wiktorowo, Wiosna, Witowo and Wygranka.

== Neighbouring gminas ==
Gmina Krzykosy is bordered by the gminas of Książ Wielkopolski, Miłosław, Nowe Miasto nad Wartą, Środa Wielkopolska and Zaniemyśl.
