= Trzykolne Młyny =

- Village
- Location within Poland
- Coordinates: 52°12′N 17°0′E
- Country: Poland
- Voivodeship: Greater Poland
- County: Poznań
- Gmina: Kórnik
- Elevation: 70 m (230 ft)

Trzykolne Młyny [tʂɨˈkɔlnɛ ˈmwɨnɨ] is a village in the administrative district of Gmina Kórnik, within Poznań County, Greater Poland Voivodeship, in west-central Poland.
