= Henrykowo, Gmina Środa Wielkopolska =

Henrykowo
- Settlement
- Location within Poland
- Coordinates: 52°13′46″N 17°19′47″E
- Country: Poland
- Voivodeship: Greater Poland
- County: Środa
- Gmina: Środa Wielkopolska

Henrykowo [xɛnrɨˈkɔvɔ] is a settlement in the administrative district of Gmina Środa Wielkopolska, within Środa County, Greater Poland Voivodeship, in west-central Poland.
