= Januszewo, Gmina Środa Wielkopolska =

Januszewo
- Village
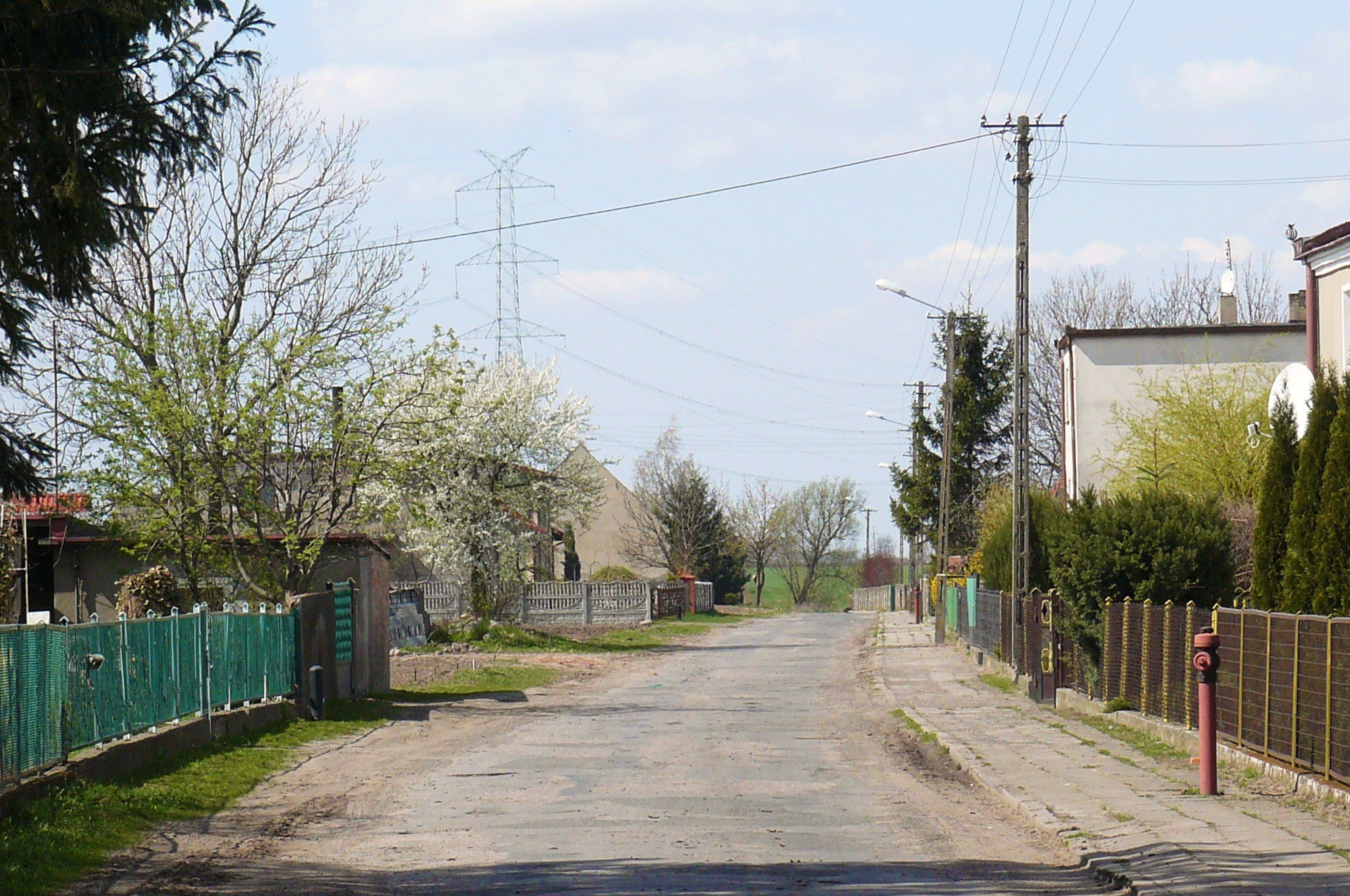
- Januszewo village center

- Location within Poland
- Coordinates: 52°15′N 17°12′E
- Country: Poland
- Voivodeship: Greater Poland
- County: Środa
- Gmina: Środa Wielkopolska
- Population: 140

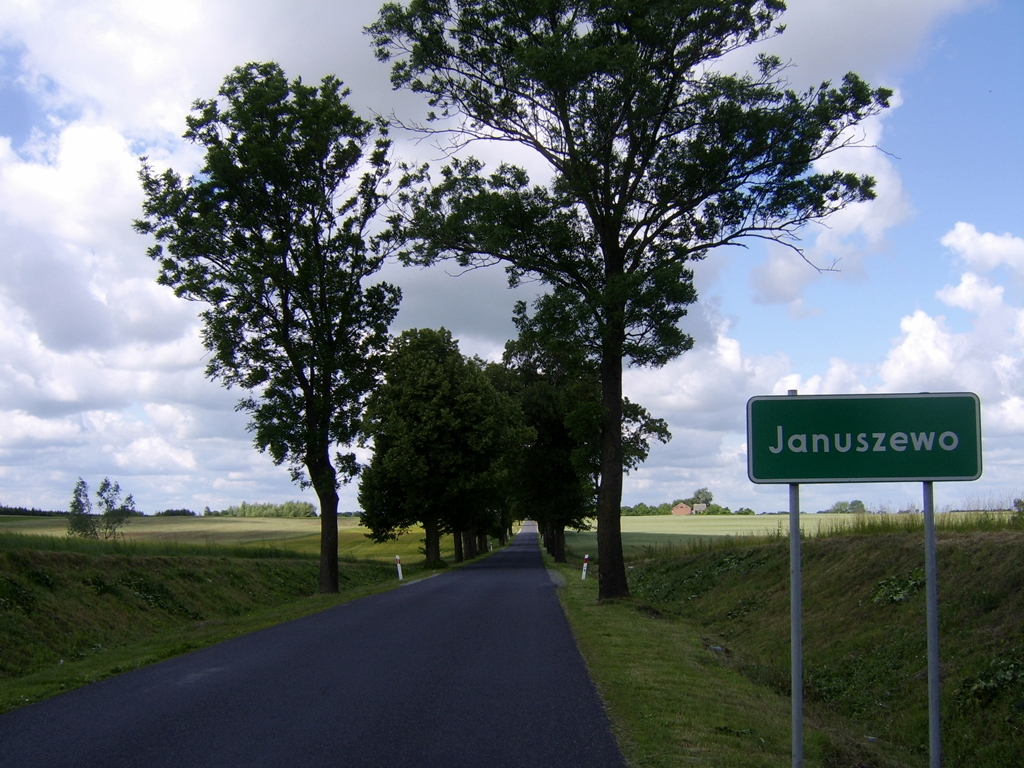
Entrance to the village

Januszewo ([januˈʂɛvɔ]; German: Jahnsfeld) is a village in the administrative district of Gmina Środa Wielkopolska, within Środa County, Greater Poland Voivodeship, in west-central Poland.
