= Świątniczki =

- Village
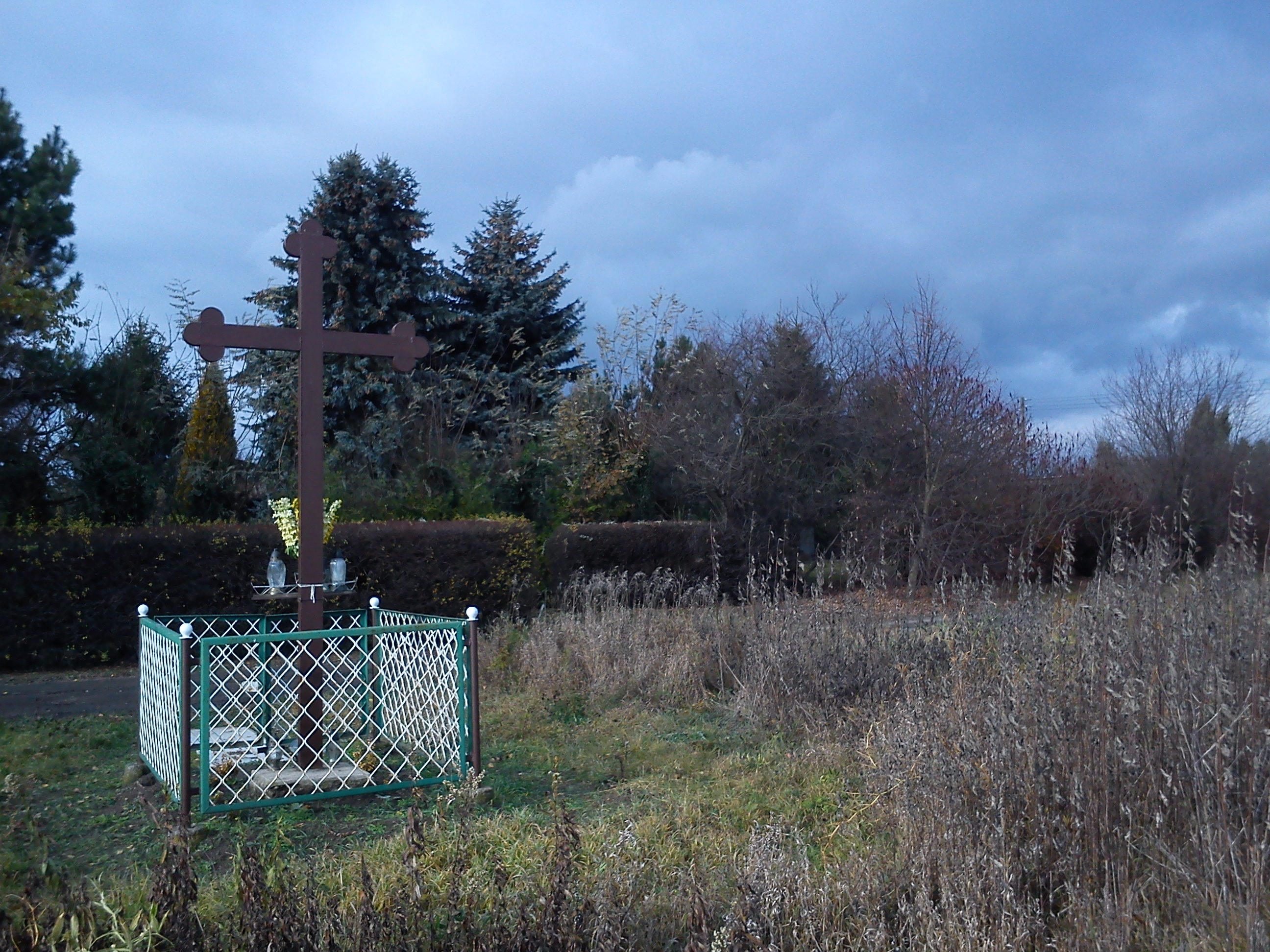

- Location within Poland
- Coordinates: 52°20′21″N 17°00′34″E
- Country: Poland
- Voivodeship: Greater Poland
- County: Poznań
- Gmina: Kórnik

Świątniczki (Polish pronunciation: [ɕfjɔntˈɲit͡ʂkʲi]) is a village in the administrative district of Gmina Kórnik, within Poznań County, Greater Poland Voivodeship, in west-central Poland.
