= Pierzchno, Gmina Środa Wielkopolska =

Pierzchno
- Village
- Location within Poland
- Coordinates: 52°12′N 17°21′E
- Country: Poland
- Voivodeship: Greater Poland
- County: Środa
- Gmina: Środa Wielkopolska
- Population: 70

Pierzchno [ˈpjɛʂxnɔ] is a village in the administrative district of Gmina Środa Wielkopolska, within Środa County, Greater Poland Voivodeship, in west-central Poland.
