= Czartki, Gmina Środa Wielkopolska =

Czartki
- Settlement
- Location within Poland
- Coordinates: 52°15′N 17°14′E
- Country: Poland
- Voivodeship: Greater Poland
- County: Środa
- Gmina: Środa Wielkopolska

Czartki [ˈt͡ʂartki] is a settlement in the administrative district of Gmina Środa Wielkopolska, within Środa County, Greater Poland Voivodeship, in west-central Poland.
