= Kaliszans =

Kaliszanie (Polish)
- Coat of arms of the Kalisz Region

Regions with significant populations
- Poland (Greater Poland Voivodeship)

Languages
- Polish (Greater Poland dialect)

Religion
- Roman Catholicism

Related ethnic groups
- Poles, Greater Poland people

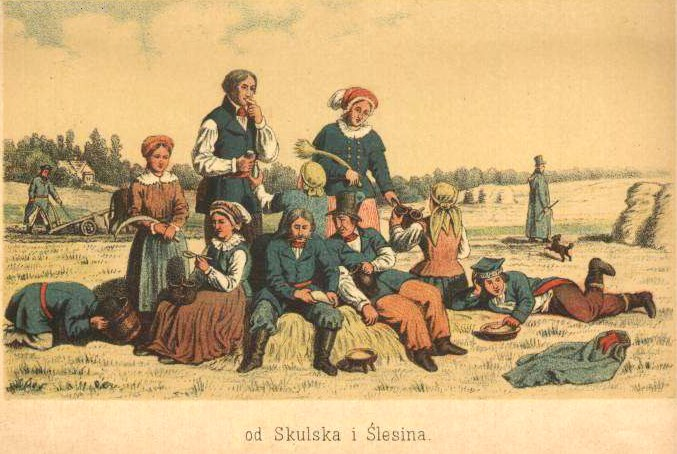
"Folk of Kalisz Region", 1890 illustration by Oskar Kolberg, depicting Kaliszans in traditional cloths.

Kaliszans (Note: Polish: Kaliszacy, Kaliszanie) are members of an ethnographic group of Polish people from the Kalisz Region, located within the Greater Poland Voivodeship, Poland. They are part of the bigger ethnographic group of Greater Poland people.
