= Yanushevsky =

Yanushevsky (masculine), Yanushevskaya (feminine) is a Russian-language surname, a variant of the Polish surname Januszewski. Notable people with the surname include:

- Alexey Yanushevsky, Belarusian professional computer game player
- Ivan Yanushevsky (1821-1879), Imperial Russian counter admiral
- Viktor Yanushevsky, Belarusian football player
