= Bogusławki, Gmina Krzykosy =

Bogusławki
- Village
- Location within Poland
- Coordinates: 52°7′56″N 17°20′21″E
- Country: Poland
- Voivodeship: Greater Poland
- County: Środa
- Gmina: Krzykosy

Bogusławki [bɔɡuˈswafki] is a village in the administrative district of Gmina Krzykosy, within Środa County, Greater Poland Voivodeship, in west-central Poland.
