= Garby, Warmian-Masurian Voivodeship =

Former village in Warmian-Masurian Voivodeship, Poland

Garby
- Location within Poland
- Coordinates: 54°17′11″N 20°27′11″E
- Country: Poland
- Voivodeship: Warmian-Masurian
- County: Bartoszyce
- Gmina: Górowo Iławeckie
- Time zone: UTC+1 (CET)
  - Summer (DST): UTC+2 (CEST)
- Vehicle registration: NBA

Garby is an abandoned village in the administrative district of Gmina Górowo Iławeckie, in Bartoszyce County, Warmian-Masurian Voivodeship, in northern Poland.

From 1945 to 1958 Garby was administratively located in the Iławka County in the Masurian District and Olsztyn Voivodeship.
