= Krzykosy, Gmina Krzykosy =

Krzykosy
- Village
- Location within Poland
- Coordinates: 52°6′36″N 17°22′20″E
- Country: Poland
- Voivodeship: Greater Poland
- County: Środa
- Gmina: Krzykosy

Krzykosy [kʂɨˈkɔsɨ] is a village in Środa County, Greater Poland Voivodeship, in west-central Poland. It is the seat of the gmina (administrative district) called Gmina Krzykosy.
