= Artur Januszewski =

Polish footballer

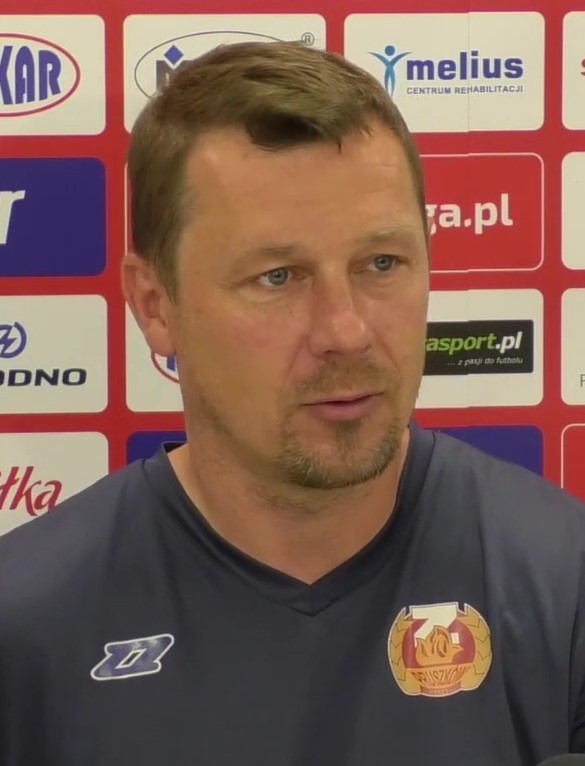

Personal information
- Full name: Artur Januszewski
- Date of birth: 2 July 1976 (age 50)
- Place of birth: Działdowo, Poland
- Height: 1.84 m (6 ft 0 in)
- Position: Midfielder

Senior career*
Years	Team	Apps	(Gls)
- Start Działdowo
1996–1997	Warmia Olsztyn		
1998–2002	Stomil Olsztyn	129	(1)
2002–2003	Dyskobolia Grodzisk Wielkopolski	20	(0)
2003	Wisła Płock	6	(0)
2004–2005	Zagłębie Lubin	12	(3)
2005–2007	Górnik Polkowice	62	(1)
2007–2015	Znicz Pruszków	225	(11)
- * Club domestic league appearances and goals

Artur Januszewski (born 2 July 1976) is a Polish former professional footballer who played as a midfielder.
