= Robakowo, Greater Poland Voivodeship =

Robakowo
- Village
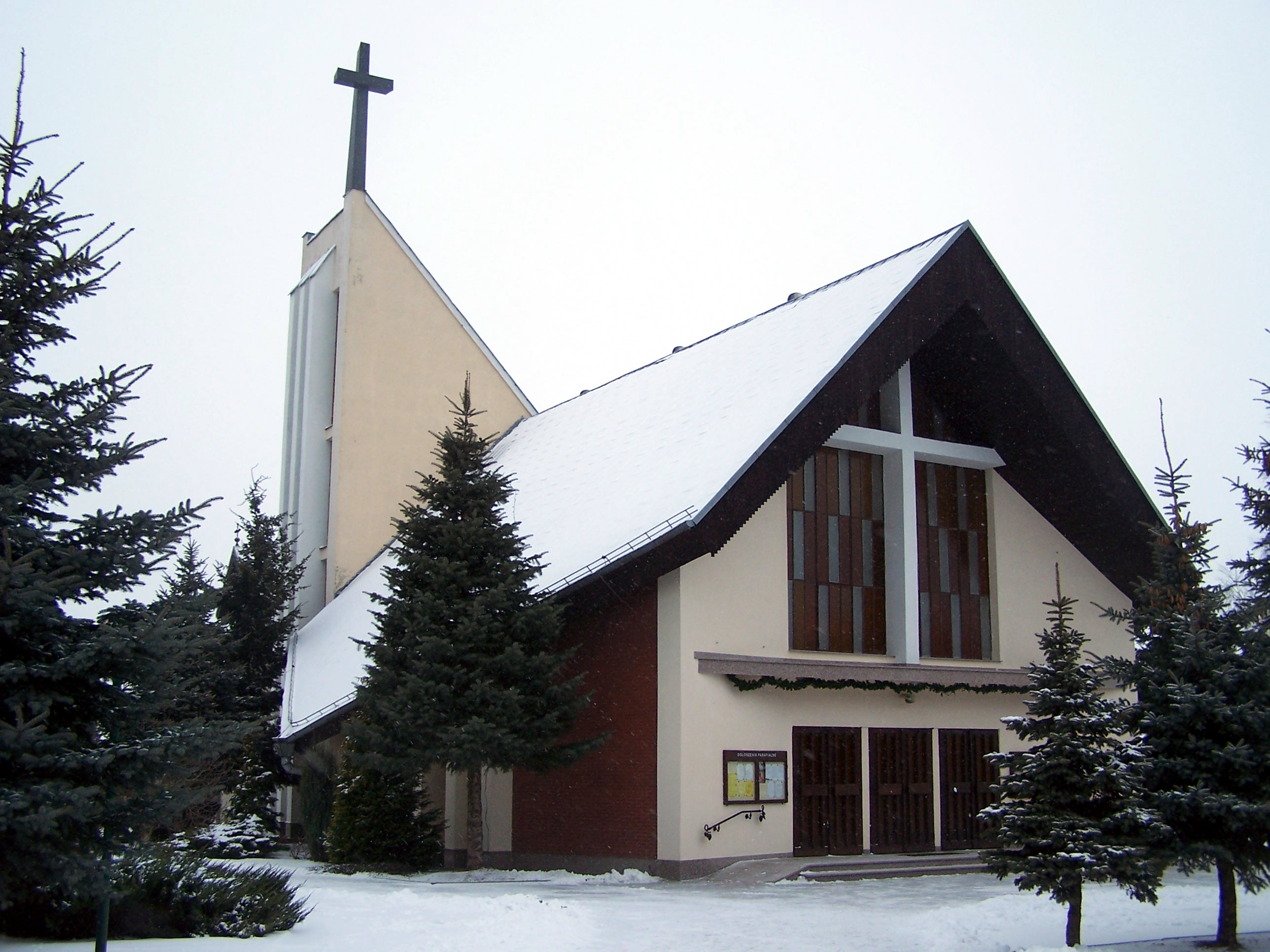
- Saint Joseph of Tradesman church in Robakowo

- Location within Poland
- Coordinates: 52°19′N 17°4′E
- Country: Poland
- Voivodeship: Greater Poland
- County: Poznań
- Gmina: Kórnik
- Elevation: 80 m (260 ft)
- Population: 860

Robakowo [rɔbaˈkɔvɔ] is a village in the administrative district of Gmina Kórnik, within Poznań County, Greater Poland Voivodeship, in west-central Poland.
