= Dębiec, Gmina Kórnik =

Dębiec
- Village
- Location within Poland
- Coordinates: 52°14′N 17°9′E
- Country: Poland
- Voivodeship: Greater Poland
- County: Poznań
- Gmina: Kórnik
- Elevation: 80 m (260 ft)
- Population: 110
- Time zone: UTC+1 (CET)
  - Summer (DST): UTC+2 (CEST)

Dębiec [ˈdɛmbjɛt͡s] is a village in the administrative district of Gmina Kórnik, within Poznań County, Greater Poland Voivodeship, in west-central Poland.
