= Josef Turek =

Czech ice hockey player and coach

- Born: November 15, 1971 (age 54)
- Position: Forward
- Shot: Left
- Played for: HC Plzeň; HKm Nitra
- Playing career: 1990–2002

Josef Turek (born November 15, 1971) is a Czech ice hockey coach and former player.

Turek was most recently head coach of MHk 32 Liptovský Mikuláš of the Tipsport Liga for the 2020–21 season, but was fired on September 2, 2020 after just two pre-season games which included a 13-2 loss to HK Dukla Trenčín.

Before coaching, Turek played as a forward most notably for HC Plzeň of the Czechoslovak First Ice Hockey League and HKm Nitra of the Slovak Extraliga.
