= Januszewice =

Januszewice may refer to the following places:

- Januszewice, Greater Poland Voivodeship (west-central Poland)
- Januszewice, Łódź Voivodeship (central Poland)
- Januszewice, Świętokrzyskie Voivodeship (south-central Poland)
