= Leokadija Počikovska =

Lithuanian politician

Leokadija Počikovska-Janušauskienė (Polish: Leokadia Poczykowska; born on September 24, 1955, near Hrodna in Belarus) is a Lithuanian politician of Polish nationality and a public activist. She was a deputy chairman of the Electoral Action of Poles in Lithuania and the mayor of the Vilnius district municipality. She is a member of Seimas since the 2004 elections. She is currently associated with the Lithuanian Peasant Popular Union's faction.

Born in Kreva, Byelorussian SSR, in 1957 she moved with her parents to Lithuanian SSR and settled in Vilnius. There she received a degree in economics.

Since 1995 she has been a member of the Electoral Action of Poles in Lithuania (rising to the rank of deputy chairman) and the Society of Poles in Lithuania. Between 1993 and 1995 Počikovska was a controller of Vilnius district municipality's Control service. Between 1995 and 2005 she was also a member of the Council of Vilnius district municipality.

In 1996 by invitation of Baltic Foundation had training course in the municipalities and the tax inspectorate of the United States. In 1999 had training course on women right and social matters in the USA.

In 2008 Leokadija Počikovska left the Electoral Action of Poles because, as she noted, the party chairman disregarded other opinions.
