= Środa County, Greater Poland Voivodeship =

Środa County Powiat średzki
- County
- Flag Coat of arms

- Location within the voivodeship
- Coordinates (Środa Wielkopolska): 52°14′N 17°17′E
- Country: Poland
- Voivodeship: Greater Poland
- Seat: Środa Wielkopolska
- Gminas: Total 5: Gmina Dominowo; Gmina Krzykosy; Gmina Nowe Miasto nad Wartą; Gmina Środa Wielkopolska; Gmina Zaniemyśl

Area
  - Total: 623.18 km^{2} (240.61 sq mi)

Population (2006)
  - Total: 54,568
  - Density: 87.564/km^{2} (226.79/sq mi)
  - Urban: 21,635
  - Rural: 32,933
- Car plates: PSR
- Website: www.srodawlkp-powiat.pl

Środa County (Polish: powiat średzki [ˈpɔvjat ˈɕrɛt͡skʲi]) is a unit of territorial administration and local government (powiat) in Greater Poland Voivodeship, west-central Poland. It came into being on January 1, 1999, as a result of the Polish local government reforms passed in 1998. Its administrative seat and only town is Środa Wielkopolska, which lies 32 kilometres (20 mi) south-east of the regional capital Poznań.

The county covers an area of 623.18 square kilometres (240.6 sq mi). As of 2006 its total population is 54,568, out of which the population of Środa Wielkopolska is 21,635 and the rural population is 32,933.

== Neighbouring counties ==
Środa County is bordered by Września County to the east, Jarocin County to the south, Śrem County to the south-west and Poznań County to the north-west.

== Administrative divisions ==
The county is subdivided into five gminas (one urban-rural and four rural). These are listed in the following table, in descending order of population.

Gmina	Type	Area (km²)	Population (2006)	Seat
Gmina Środa Wielkopolska	urban-rural	207.1	30,023	Środa Wielkopolska
Gmina Nowe Miasto nad Wartą	rural	119.5	9,025	Nowe Miasto nad Wartą
Gmina Krzykosy	rural	110.5	6,500	Krzykosy
Gmina Zaniemyśl	rural	106.8	6,191	Zaniemyśl
Gmina Dominowo	rural	79.3	2,829	Dominowo
