= Rogalin Ways =

Ecotouristic pilgrimage routes leading to Rogalin, Poland

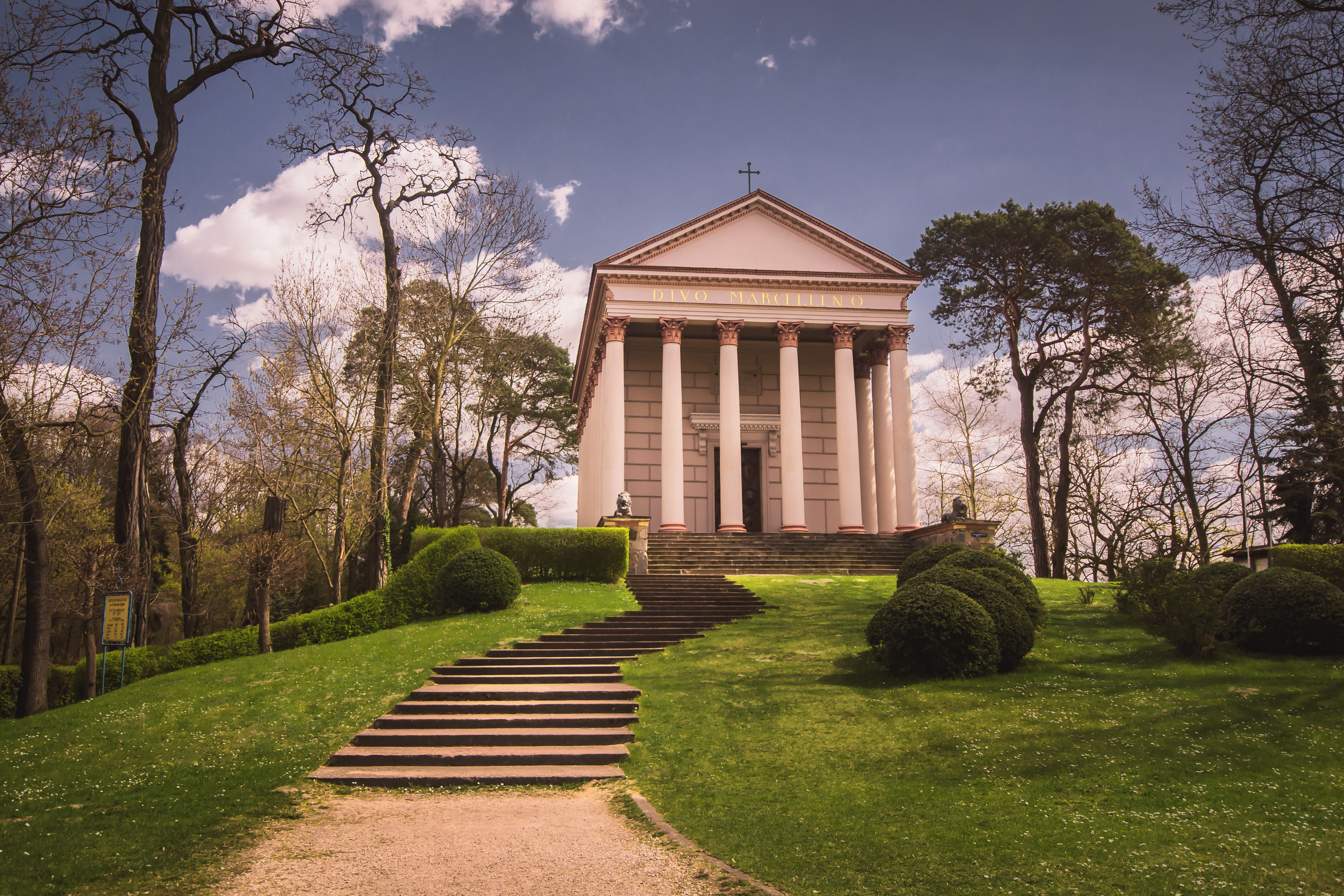
St. Marcellinus' Church and Raczyński family mausoleum: destination of all the Rogalin Ways

Rogalin Ways (in full, Rogalin Ways of the Holy Spirit) is a network of pilgrimage routes promoting ecotourism, created in Rogalin, Poland, to commemorate the 200th anniversary of St. Marcellinus' Church and its Raczyński family mausoleum.

== History ==
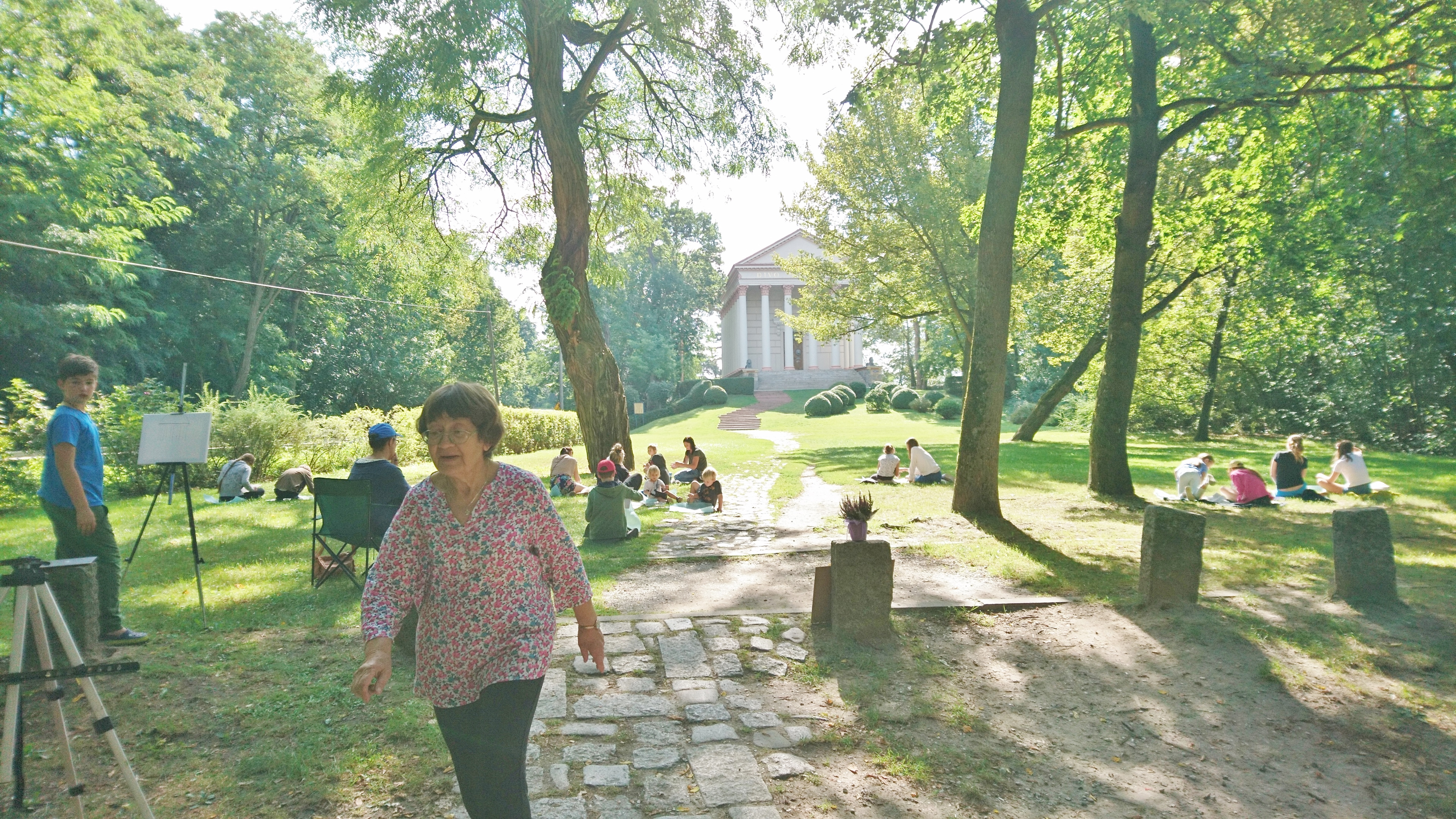
Outdoor painting session – which in 2020 initiated the celebration of the 200th anniversary of the Church of St. Marcellinus – led by Lucyna Smok

The Rogalin Ways routes were created in 2021 in celebration of the 200th anniversary of St. Marcellinus' Church, built by Count Edward Raczyński (1786–1845). Parishioners (supervised by Fr Adam Pawłowski) prepared maps of the routes, summarized historical facts, described general pilgrimaging principles, and proposed spiritual tasks. As part of a project cofinanced by the Caritas Laudato Si' programme, six invited scientists led nature walks on six Ways and wrote educational materials for pilgrims and tourists. Educational brochures for the remaining three routes, as a volunteer effort, were published in 2022 and 2023 with support from the Zakłady Kórnickie Foundation.

The descriptions of the routes mention the achievements of the Raczyński family, especially of Poznań honorary citizen Edward Raczyński, who in the first half of the 19th century promoted hygiene (e.g., by funding the first municipal water pipeline in Poznań); supported Polish patriotism and the intellectual development of all the citizens (e.g., by publishing activities and by building the Raczyński Library, the oldest public library in Poland); fostered local communities' spiritual development by building churches in Rogalin and Zaniemyśl and the Golden Chapel in the Poznań Cathedral); and protected nature (e.g., the Rogalin oaks Lech, Czech, and Rus).

The promotion of respect for nature and for history makes pilgrimages along the Rogalin Ways a model of ecotourism. For this initiative, Rogalin's St. Marcellinus Parish was recognized in the 3rd Ecological Plebiscite, organized in 2025, by Warsaw's Cardinal Stefan Wyszyński University.

== Objectives ==
The objective of the Rogalin Ways is spiritual growth via pilgrimages featuring the contemplation of nature and reflection on quotations from the Bible and the prayer for seven gifts and nine fruits of the Holy Spirit (Galatians 5:22–23). Additional objectives include the promotion of outdoor physical activity (important for both physical and mental health); the building of good relations among people via pilgrimages, family walks, and school excursions; promoting Pope Francis' integral ecology by considering quotes from his encyclical Laudato si'; protecting the biodiversity of the Rogalin Landscape Park's Natura 2000 areas (the floristic "Rogalińska Dolina Warty" and the faunistic "Ostoja Rogalińska") and the Rogalin historical monument; and promoting respect for nature and history.

== Routes ==
The Rogalin Ways are named after the nine fruits of the Holy Spirit (Galatians 5:22–23) and lead to St. Marcellinus' Church, in Rogalin, from nine localities:

1. The Way of Love (6 km, on foot only), from the Church of Our Lady of Perpetual Help in Radzewice
2. The Way of Joy (7 km), from the primary school in Radzewo
3. The Way of Peace (6 km), from Mieczewo, with an additional variant
4. The Way of Patience (12 km), from St. James' Church in Poznań-Głuszyna
5. The Way of Kindness (9 km), from the primary school in Daszewice
6. The Way of Goodness (9 km), from St. Nicholas' Church in Mosina
7. The Way of Faithfulness (8 km), from St. Joseph's Church in Puszczykowo
8. The Way of Gentleness (21 km, cycling loop), from St. Mother Teresa of Calcutta's Church in Kamionki
9. The Way of Self-Control (4 km), from St. Michael the Archangel and Our Lady, Sustainer of Christians, Church, in Rogalinek, with an additional variant

Additionally, a Way of Peace and Joy was created (23 km, cycling loop): Rogalin–Mieczewo–Czołowo–Radzewo-Rogalin.

== Educational materials ==
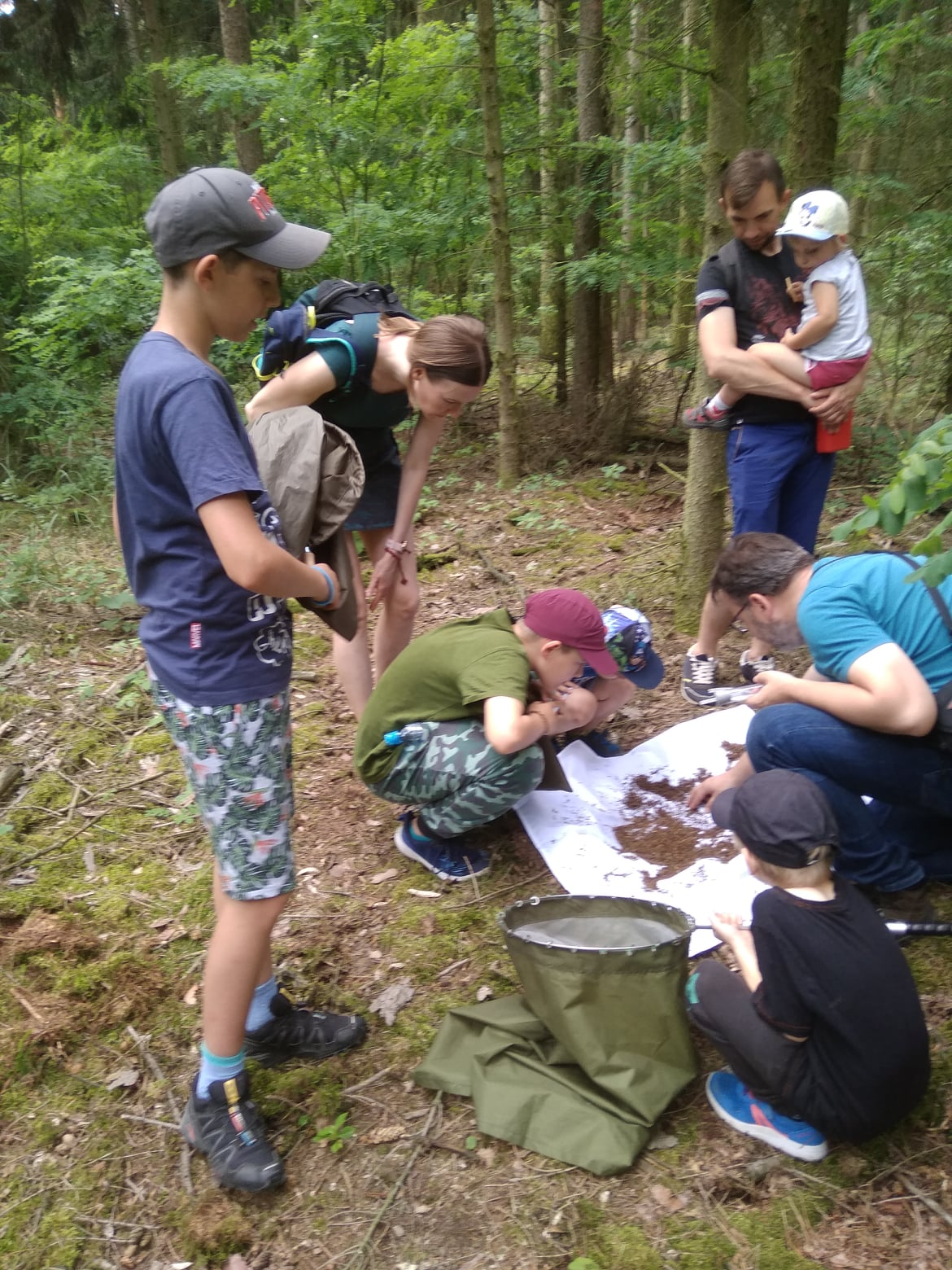
Nature walk near Rogalin with entomologist Prof. Paweł Sienkiewicz, who on its basis wrote an educational brochure (about the importance of dead wood, insects, and biodiversity) for an environmental route - the Way of Peace, inspired by Laudato Si'

On the basis of nature walks with experts in various fields, freely available educational materials have been created:

- The heritage of Olenders is an obligation – natural processes and rational water management (by Dariusz Brykała, hydrologist) – focused on oxbow lakes, natural water retention measures, and Olender settlers who drained riverside marshes – using the Way of Love in Radzewice as an example
- Nature and us – relations, processes, phenomena (by Radosław Dzięciołowski, ecologist) – focused on plants and animals in urban and agricultural landscapes – using the Way of Joy in Radzewo as an example
- The Way of Peace – about diversity and coexistence (by Paweł Sienkiewicz, entomologist) – focused on insects and dead wood – using the village of Mieczewo and its vicinity as an example
- 'Magical' places in Poznań-Głuszyna (by Aneta Czarna, botanist) – focused on flora, plant symbolism, and ecology in cemeteries – using the Way of Patience in Głuszyna (a district of Poznań) as an example
- The Way of Kindness – about plant life strategies (by Marlena Lembicz, botanist) – focused on common roadside plants – using the vicinity of the Rogalin Palace as an example
- What grows on the river Warta near Rogalin and Mosina? (by Halina Ratyńska, botanist) – focused on plant communities in river valleys – using the Way of Goodness across the Warta floodplains as an example
- In the Warta valley: about birds and more (by Viktória Takács, ornithologist) – focused on animals living along rivers – using the Way of Faithfulness in Puszczykowo as an example
- Plants and humans (by Zbigniew Celka, botanist) – focused on species associated with humans and invasive species – using the Way of Gentleness in Kamionki as an example
- About insects and ecology, not only on the Warta (by Mateusz Kęsy, entomologist) – focused on bees and other animals of riverside habitats as well as ecological problems – using the Way of Self-Control in Rogalinek as an example.

== Further development ==
Rogalin Ways are promoted as a tourist attraction and are used to integrate the local community. Online albums of photos from nature walks on these routes (with comments) have been created, as well as a guide for other parishes wishing to create similar networks of Ways of the Holy Spirit. After the Russian invasion of Ukraine in February 2022, the spiritual tasks for peace pilgrimages (based on the Way of Peace) were translated from Polish into English, Ukrainian, and Russian. The tasks include prayer to the Holy Spirit, contemplation of nature, care for other people and wildlife, and promotion of a simpler, healthier lifestyle.

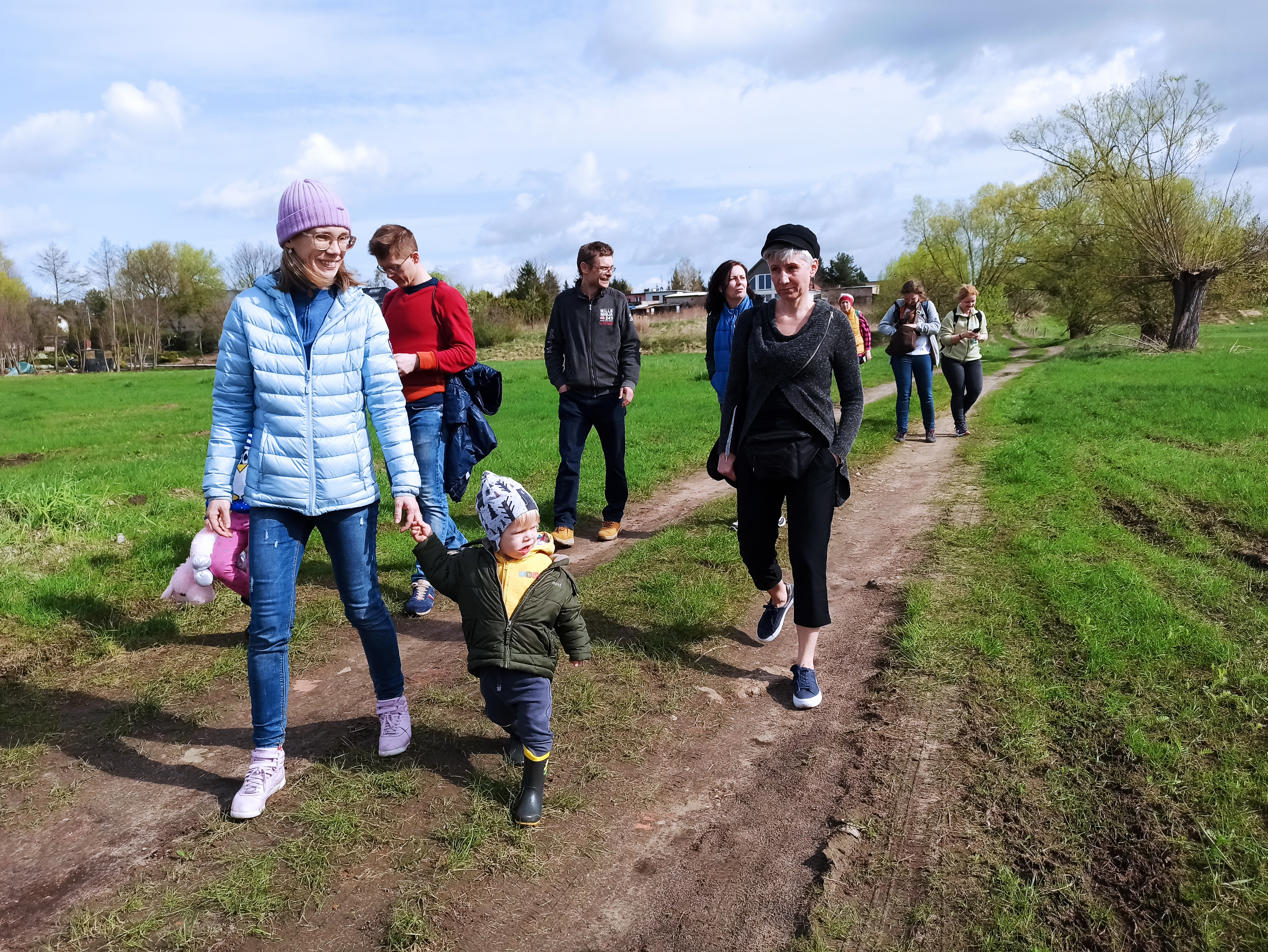
Artistic nature walk "Tree of Life" on the Way of Love in Radzewice, during a meeting of Laudato Si' animators

The general principles of Rogalin Ways formed a basis for creation of "Green Pilgrimage Principles" (as part of the PielGREEN project) by Polish animators of the Laudato Si' Movement. In May 2023, this international organization mentioned the Rogalin Ways on its blog and in its newsletter. The following year, a family meeting of Laudato Si' animators took place in Rogalin. The nature walks initiated by the Rogalin parish are continued as the "Tree of Life" project (started in 2022, partly funded by the Zakłady Kórnickie Foundation), which includes field trips, with various experts, and outdoor painting sessions as well as Tree of Life Workshops for new environmental educators.

In 2025, to celebrate the 800th anniversary of the Canticle of the Sun composed by Francis of Assisi, the Poznań Way of St. Francis was created, using the spiritual tasks for the Way of Peace. The first environmental pilgrimage on the Poznań Way of St. Francis took place on 18 January 2026, initiating the celebration of the Year of St. Francis, proclaimed by Pope Leo XIV a week earlier.

Since the spring of 2026, new local Ways of St. Francis have begun to be created, all with the same spiritual tasks, "so that the 800th anniversary of his death becomes an opportunity for true spiritual renewal". The Laudato Si' Movement promotes this initiative on its blog. The editorial team of Drzewo Franciszka (St. Francis' Tree ― a Polish portal dedicated to environmental protection and integral ecology) published an article about the "Tree of Life" project, Rogalin Ways, and Ways of St. Francis.

== Threats ==
In early 2026 it transpired that the Poznań County Roads Authority (ZDP) was planning to build a new road from Babki to Świątniki, crossing five Rogalin Ways and thus exposing pilgrims and tourists to difficulties and danger. Two variants of the planned road would also encroach on the Rogalin Estate (managed by the Raczyński Foundation), which is a protected historical monument, while a third variant would result in complete destruction of 14 hectares of forest. All this sparked fierce protests. A newly established Association for Care of Nature (Stowarzyszene Troski o Przyrodę, SToP), together with the Rogalin Estate, requested that a much cheaper and less destructive alternative to this road be considered in public consultations.
