= Rogalin =

- Village
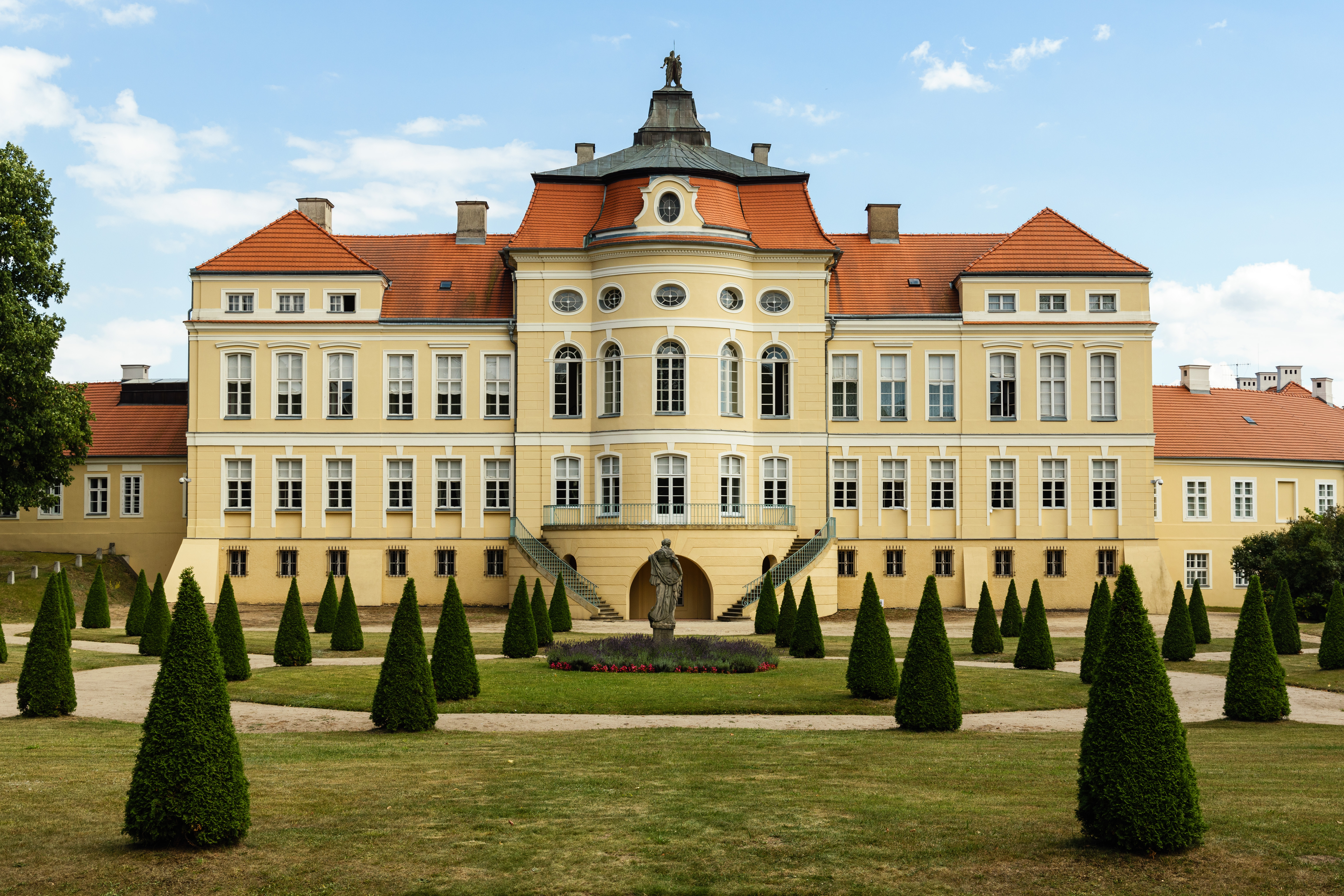
- Rogalin Palace

- Location within Poland
- Coordinates: 52°14′04″N 16°56′04″E
- Country: Poland
- Voivodeship: Greater Poland
- County: Poznań
- Gmina: Mosina
- Population (approx.): 700

Rogalin pronounced [rɔˈɡalin] is a village, in western Poland, situated on the river Warta. It is best known for the Rogalin Landscape Park (containing Poland's oldest oak trees), a Baroque palace, an art gallery, and a neoclassical church containing the Raczyński family mausoleum.

== Overview ==
Rogalin is primarily famous for its 18th-century Baroque palace, built by Kazimierz Raczyński, and the adjacent Raczyński Art Gallery. The latter houses a permanent exhibition of paintings by renowned Polish and foreign artists, including Paul Delaroche and Claude Monet, and Jan Matejko's large painting Joanna d'Arc. The Gallery was founded by Count Edward Aleksander Raczyński.

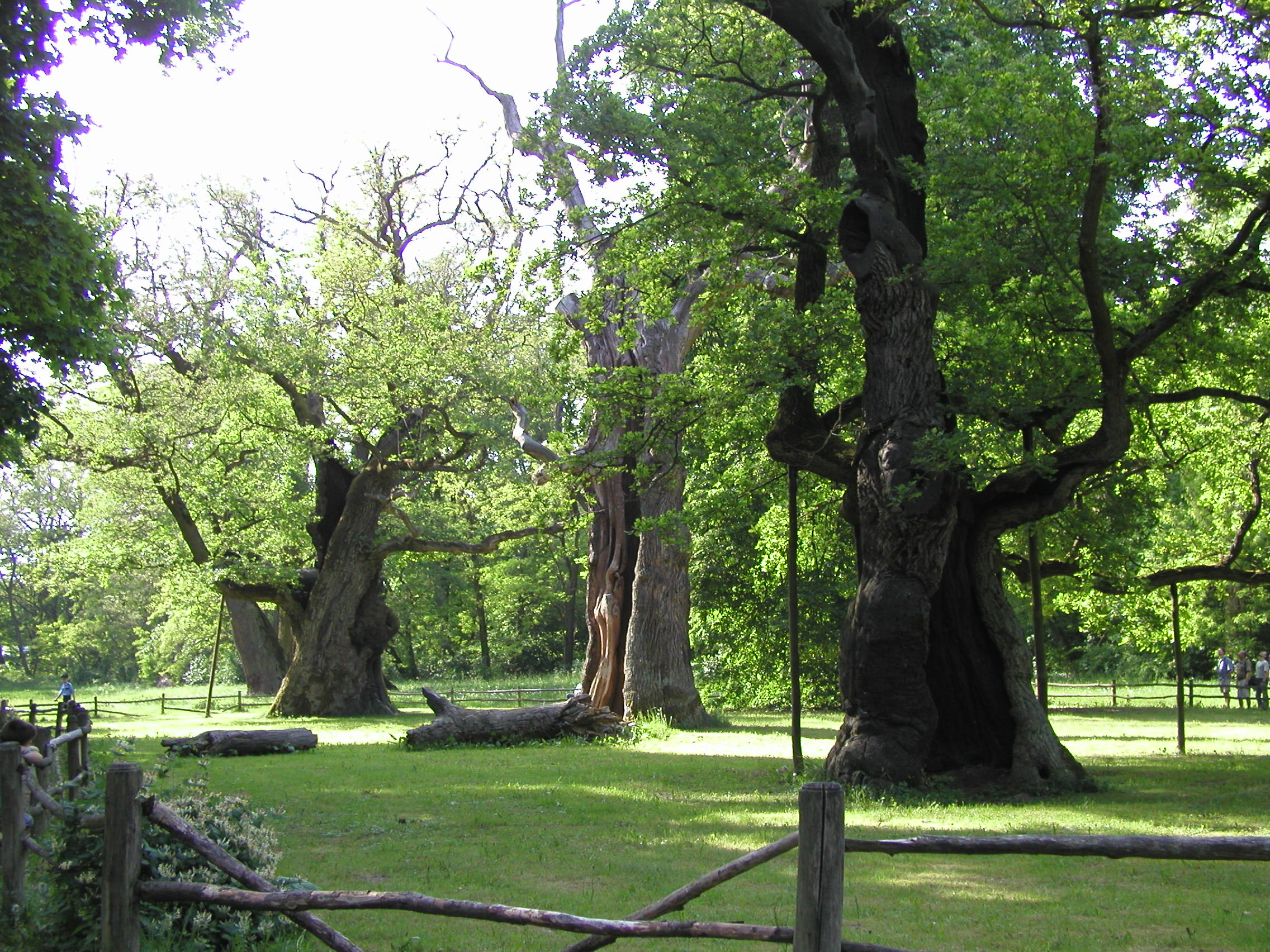
Lech, Czech, and Rus oaks

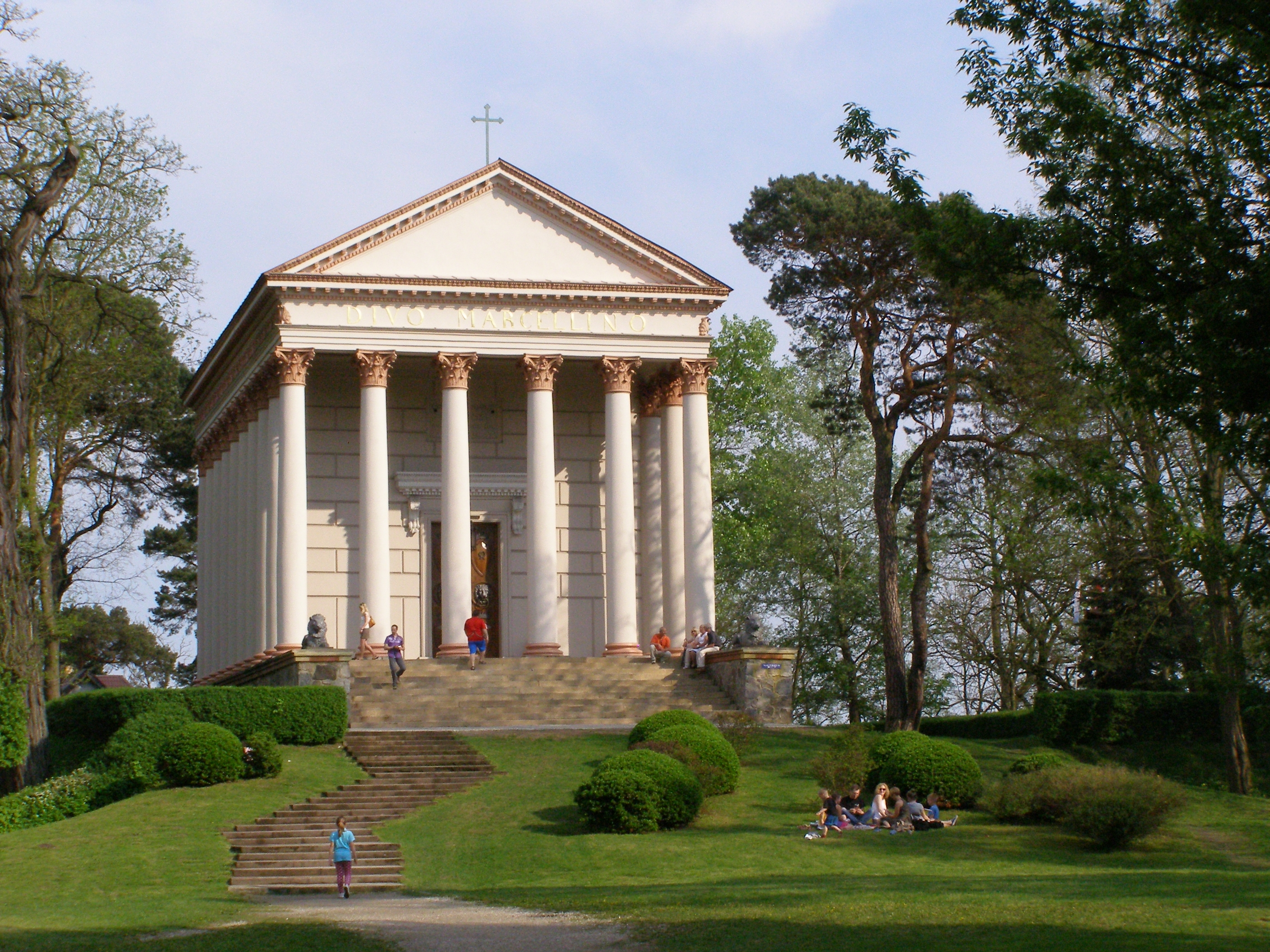
St. Marcellinus' Church, with Raczyński family mausoleum

Rogalin is also known for its 800-year-old oak trees (Polish: Dęby Rogalińskie), named respectively after legendary brothers Lech, Czech, and Rus.

St. Marcellinus' Church, with the family mausoleum, was built in 1817–1820 by Edward Raczyński (1786–1845), its design inspired by the Roman temple Maison Carrée in Nîmes, France.

The estate's last owner was Count Edward Bernard Raczyński, who in 1979–1986 was president of the Polish government-in-exile. In 1991 Count Raczyński bequeathed his Rogalin estate (including palace, art gallery, library, and church) to the Raczyński Family Foundation, presided over by the director of the National Museum in Poznań. After Count Raczyński's death in 1993, his sarcophagus was placed in the Raczyński Mausoleum in the church's crypt.

In 2018 the palace, park, and church were granted special protection as a Polish historic monument, and in 2020 the protection was extended to the entire landed estate - to the surrounding floodplain, meadows, forests, and fields.

In celebration of the church's 200 years, in 2021 a network of pilgrimage routes - the Rogalin Ways - was created, leading to the church from Radzewice, Radzewo, Mieczewo, Kamionki, Daszewice, Poznań-Głuszyna, Puszczykowo, Mosina, and Rogalinek.

The objective of the Rogalin Ways is spiritual growth via pilgrimages featuring the contemplation of nature and reflection on quotations from the Bible and the prayer for seven gifts and nine fruits of the Holy Spirit (Galatians 5:22–23). Additional objectives include the promotion of outdoor physical activity (important for both physical and mental health); the building of good relations among people via pilgrimages, family walks, and school excursions; promoting Pope Francis' integral ecology by considering quotes from his encyclical Laudato si'; protecting the biodiversity of the Rogalin Landscape Park's Natura 2000 areas (the floristic "Rogalińska Dolina Warty" and the faunistic "Ostoja Rogalińska") and the Rogalin historical monument; and promoting respect for nature and history.

== Geography ==
Much of the surrounding land comprises the protected area of ecological importance known as the Rogalin Landscape Park. Tt also partly comprises two Natura 2000 areas – Special Area of Conservation "Rogalińska Dolina Warty", and Special Protection Area "Ostoja Rogalińska" – and the Rogalin historical monument.

== Threats ==
In early 2026 it transpired that the Poznań County Roads Authority (ZDP) was planning to build a new road from Babki to Świątniki, crossing five Rogalin Ways and thus exposing pilgrims and tourists to difficulties and danger. Two variants of the planned road would also encroach on the Rogalin Estate (managed by the Raczyński Foundation), which is a protected historical monument, while a third variant would result in complete destruction of 14 hectares of forest. All this sparked fierce protests. A newly established Association for Care of Nature (Stowarzyszene Troski o Przyrodę, SToP), together with the Rogalin Estate, requested that a much cheaper and less destructive alternative to this road be considered in public consultations.

=== Gallery ===
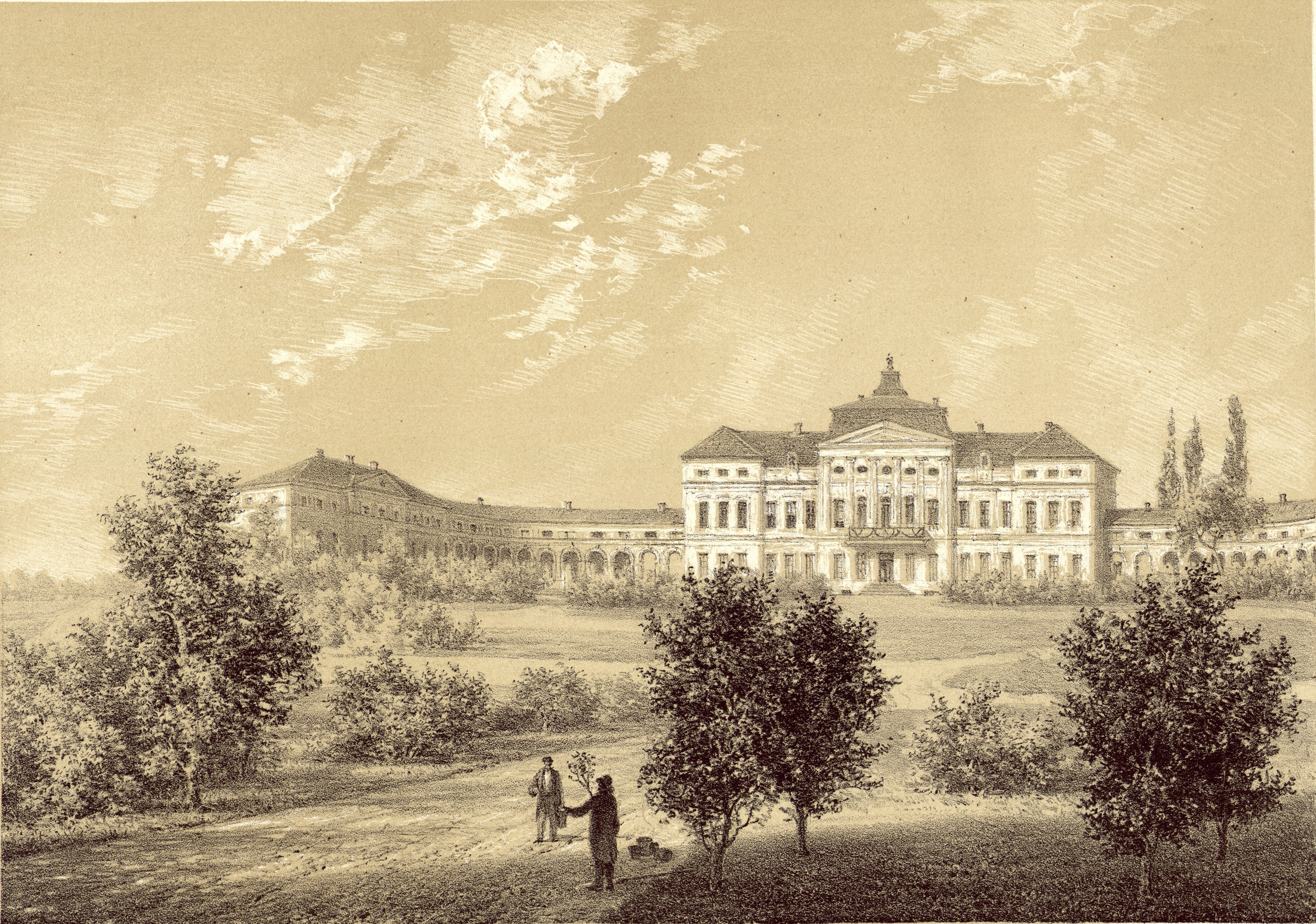
Rogalin Palace, by Napoleon Orda, 1880

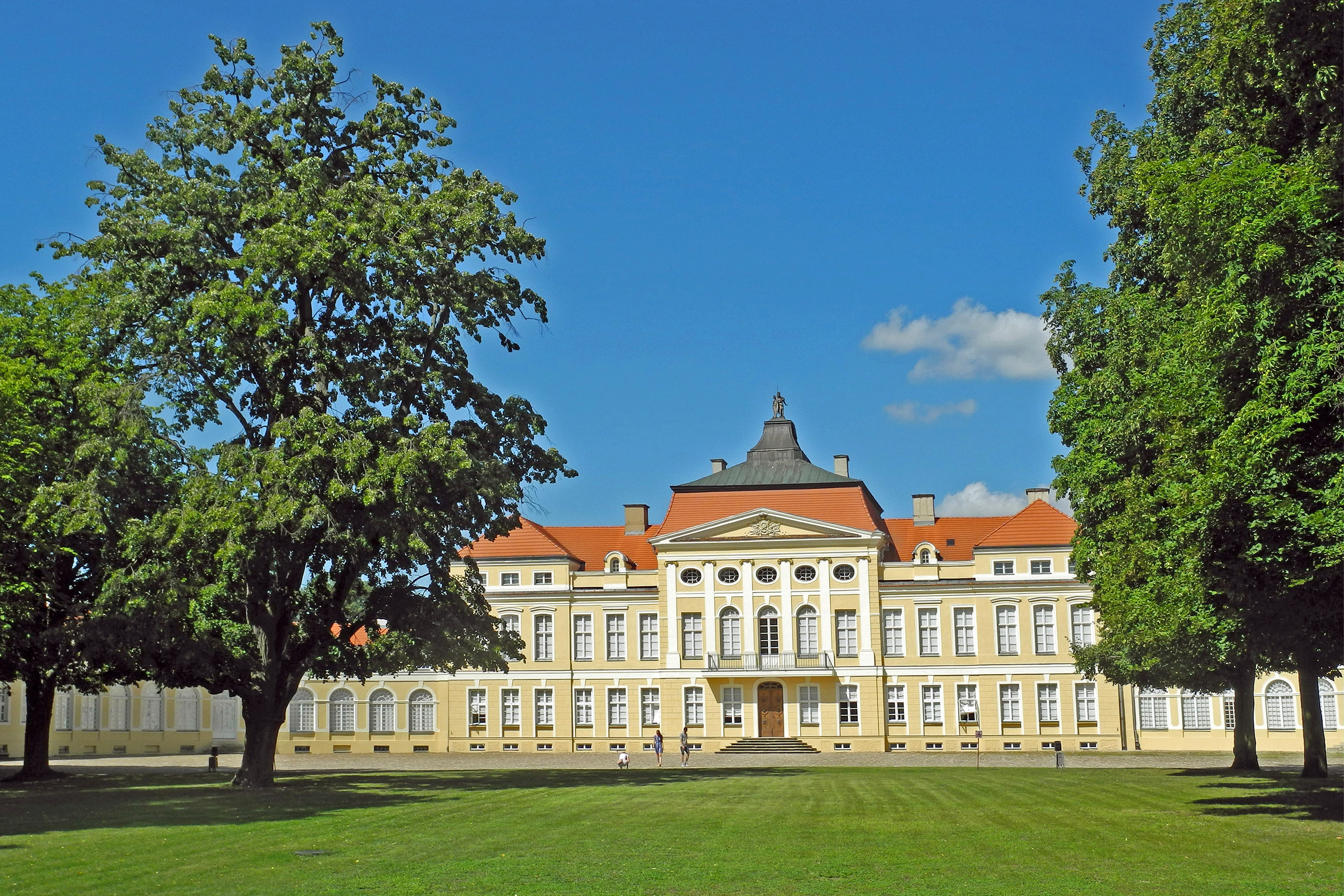
Rogalin Palace, front view

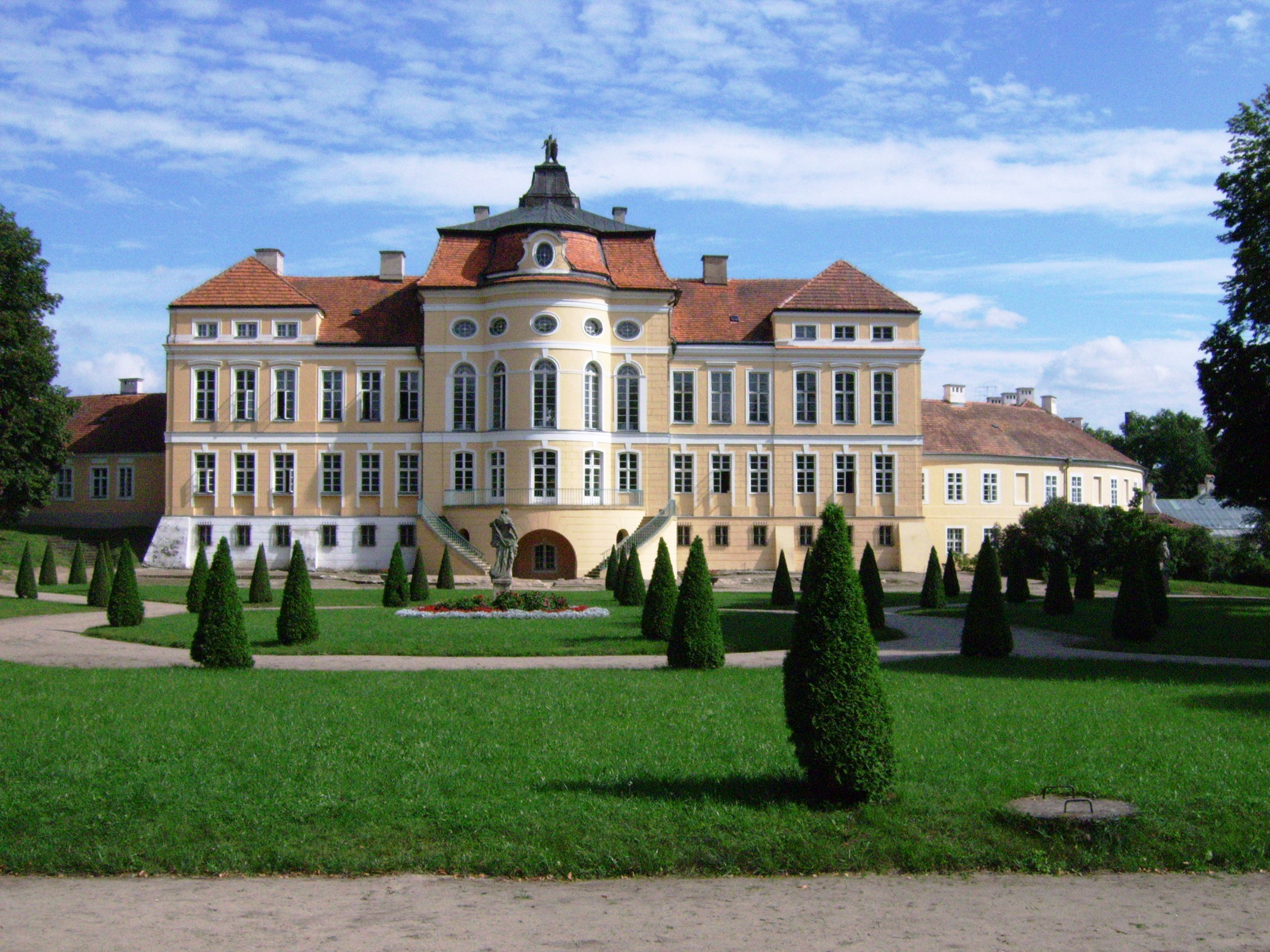
Rogalin Palace

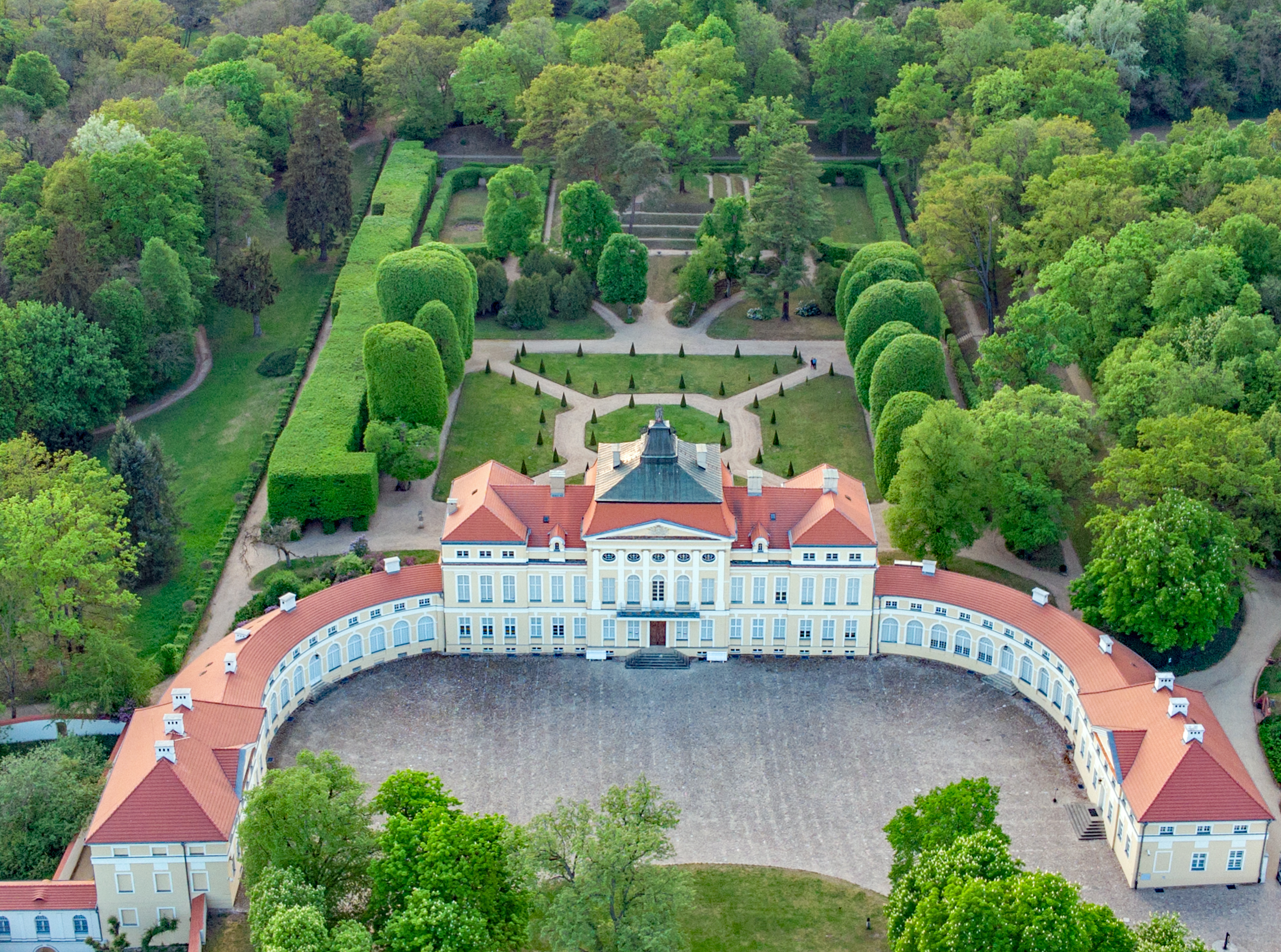
Aerial view of Palace

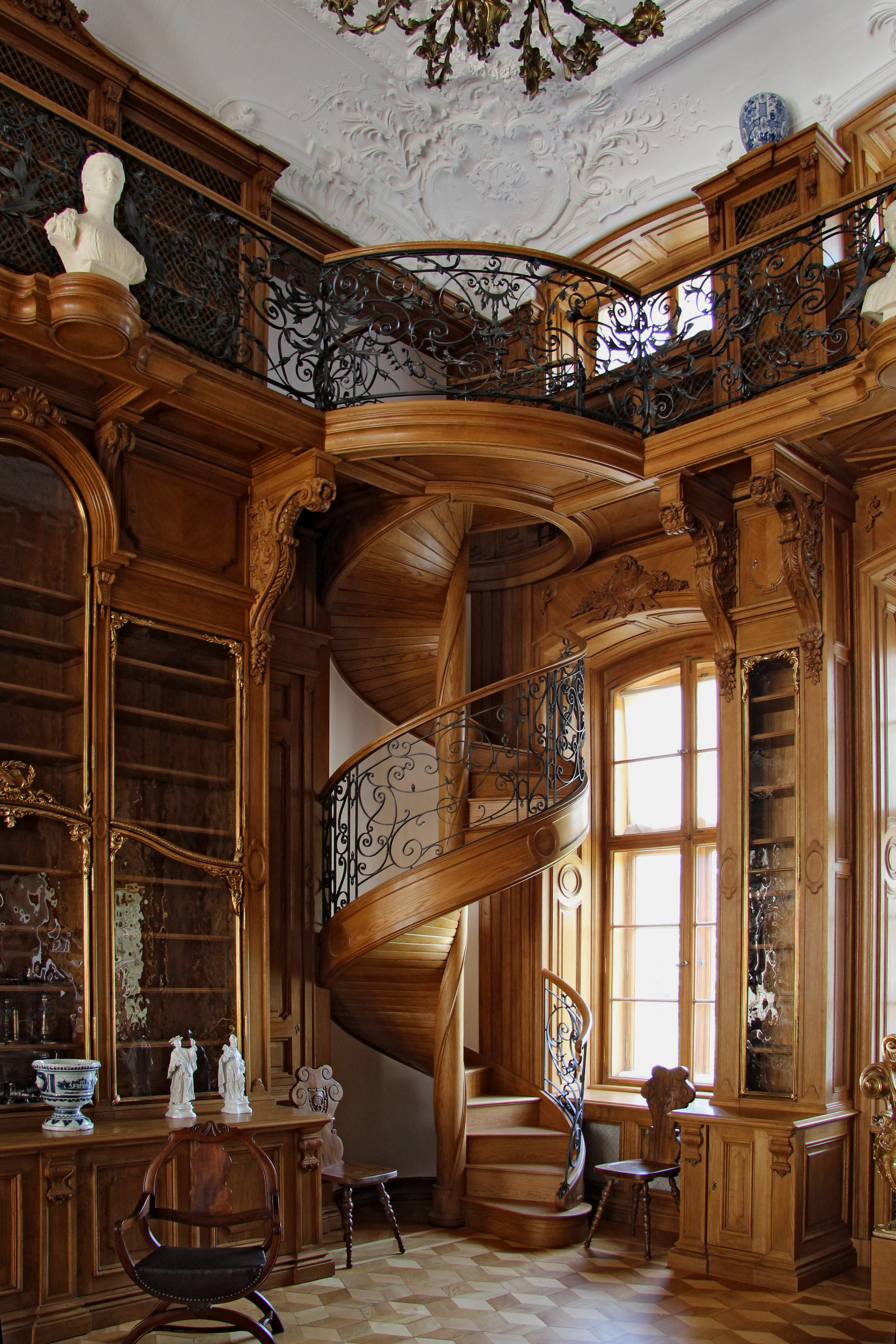
Palace library

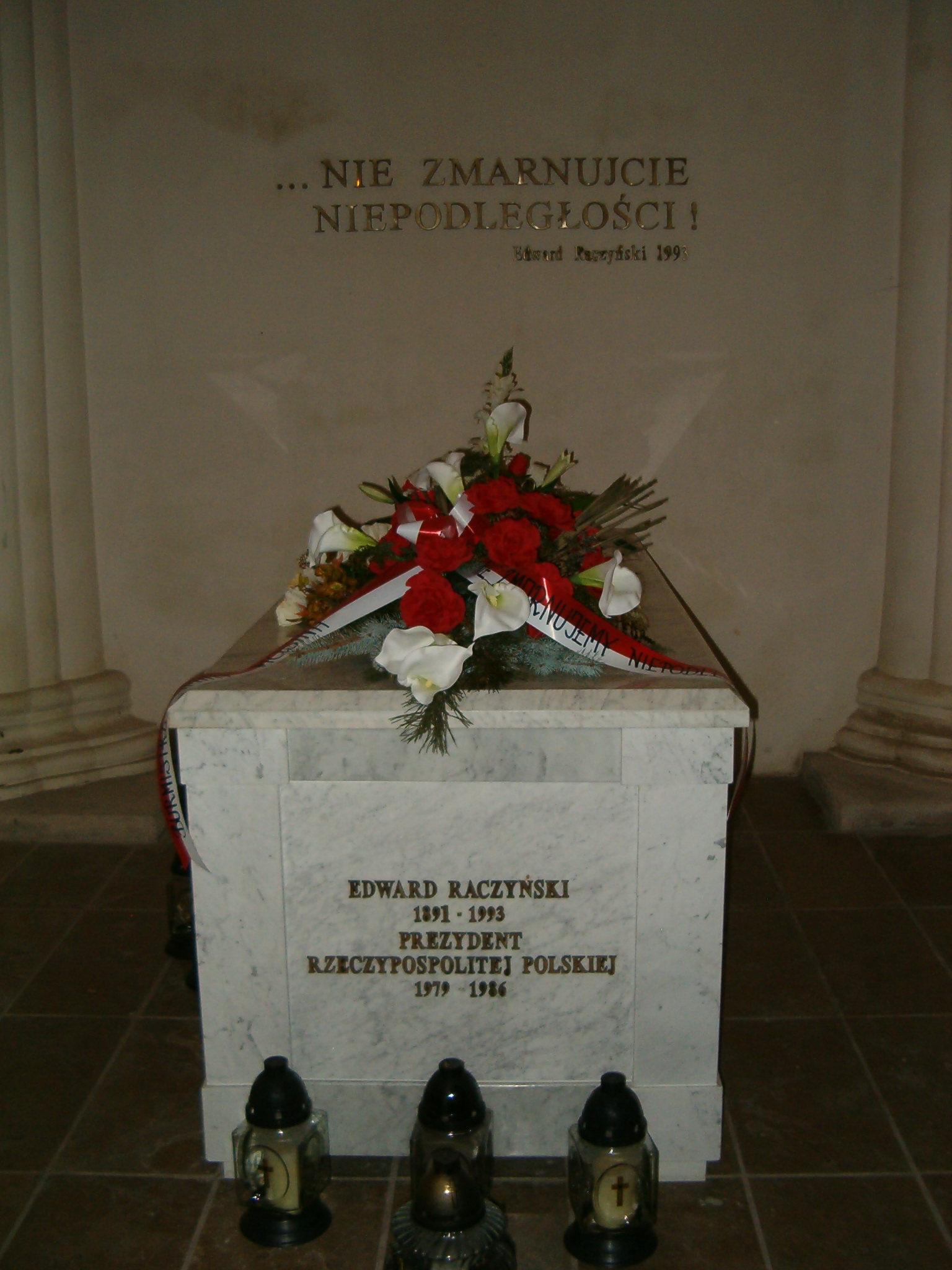
Sarcophagus of Count Edward Bernard Raczyński

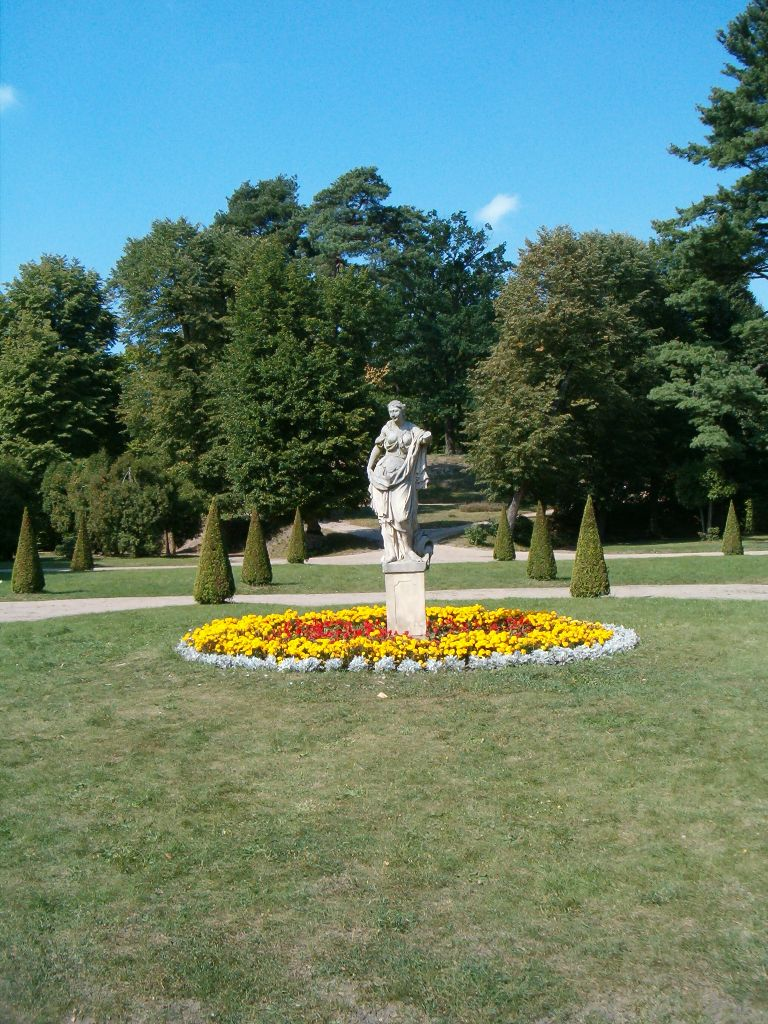
Statue in Rogalin Park

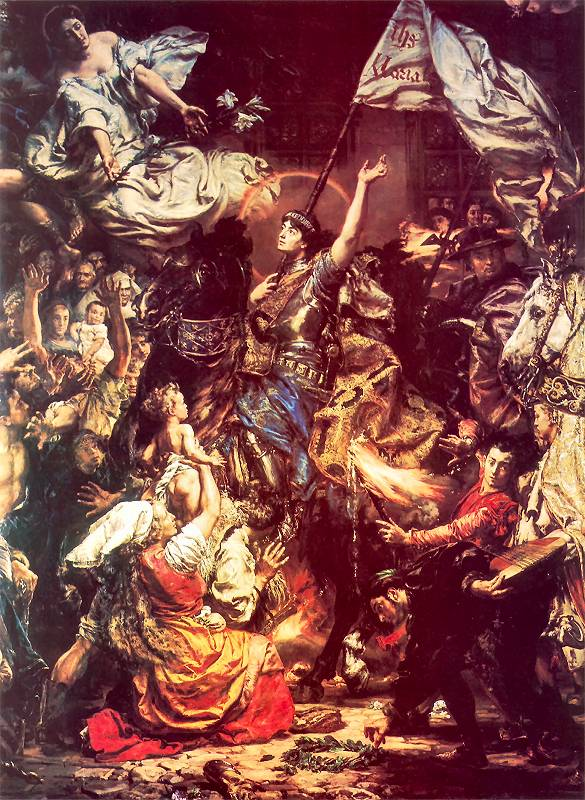
Joanna d`Arc, fragment of large 1886 painting by Jan Matejko

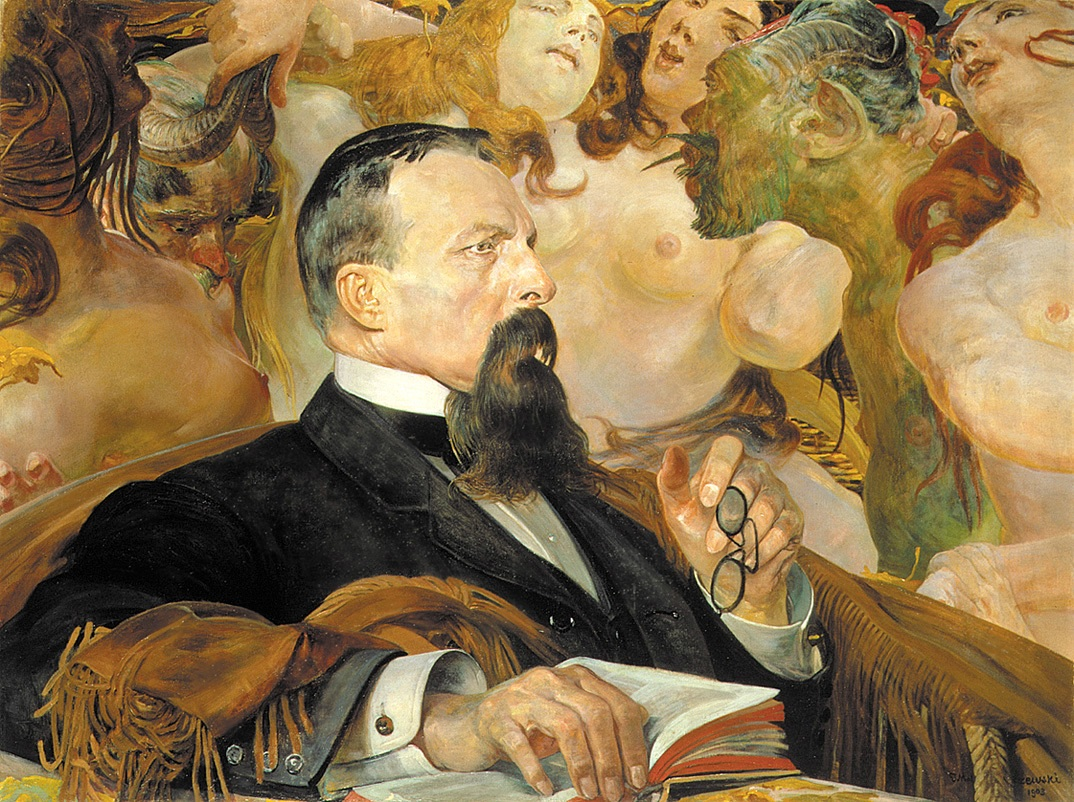
Portrait of Edward Aleksander Raczyński, by Jacek Malczewski

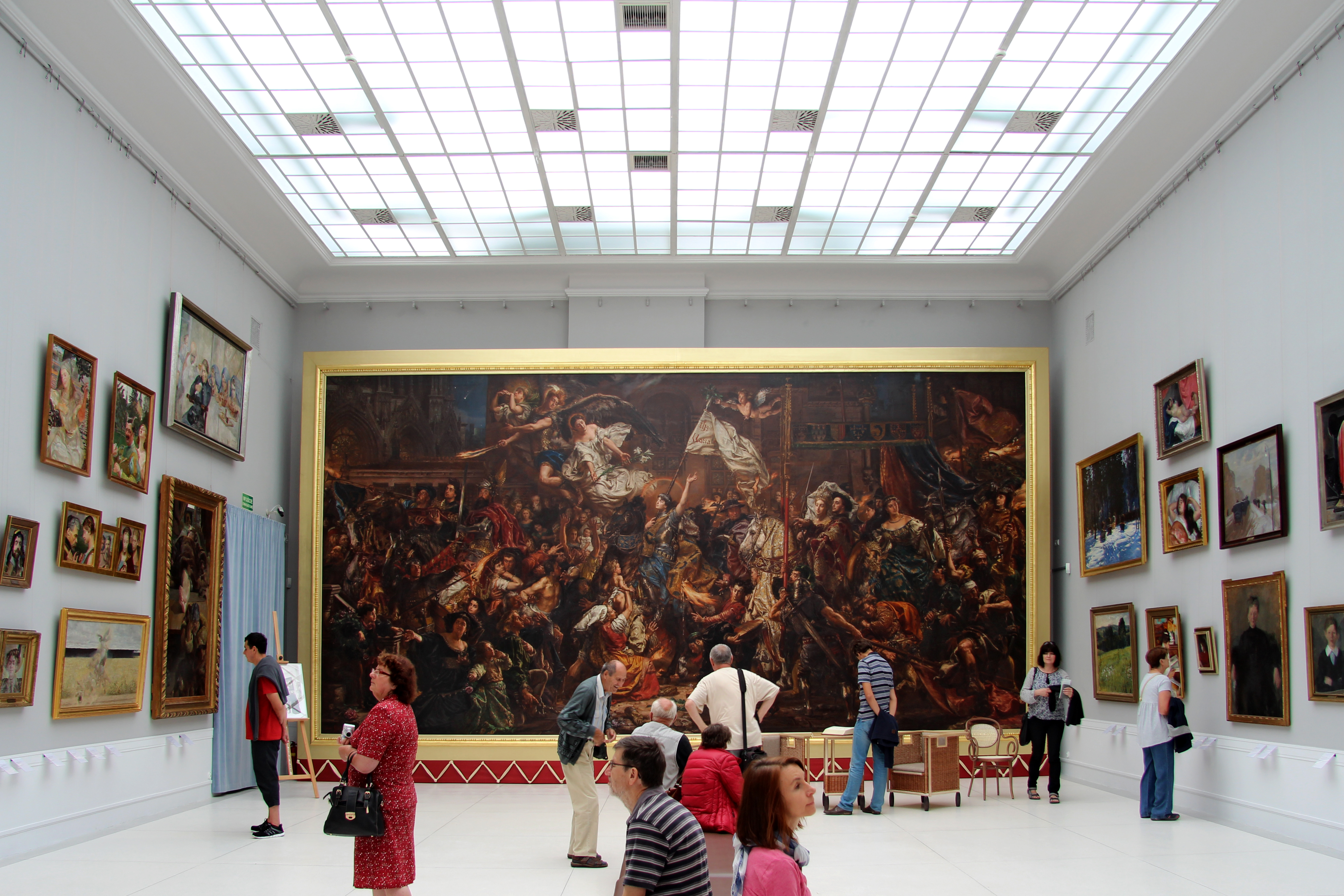
Palace painting gallery

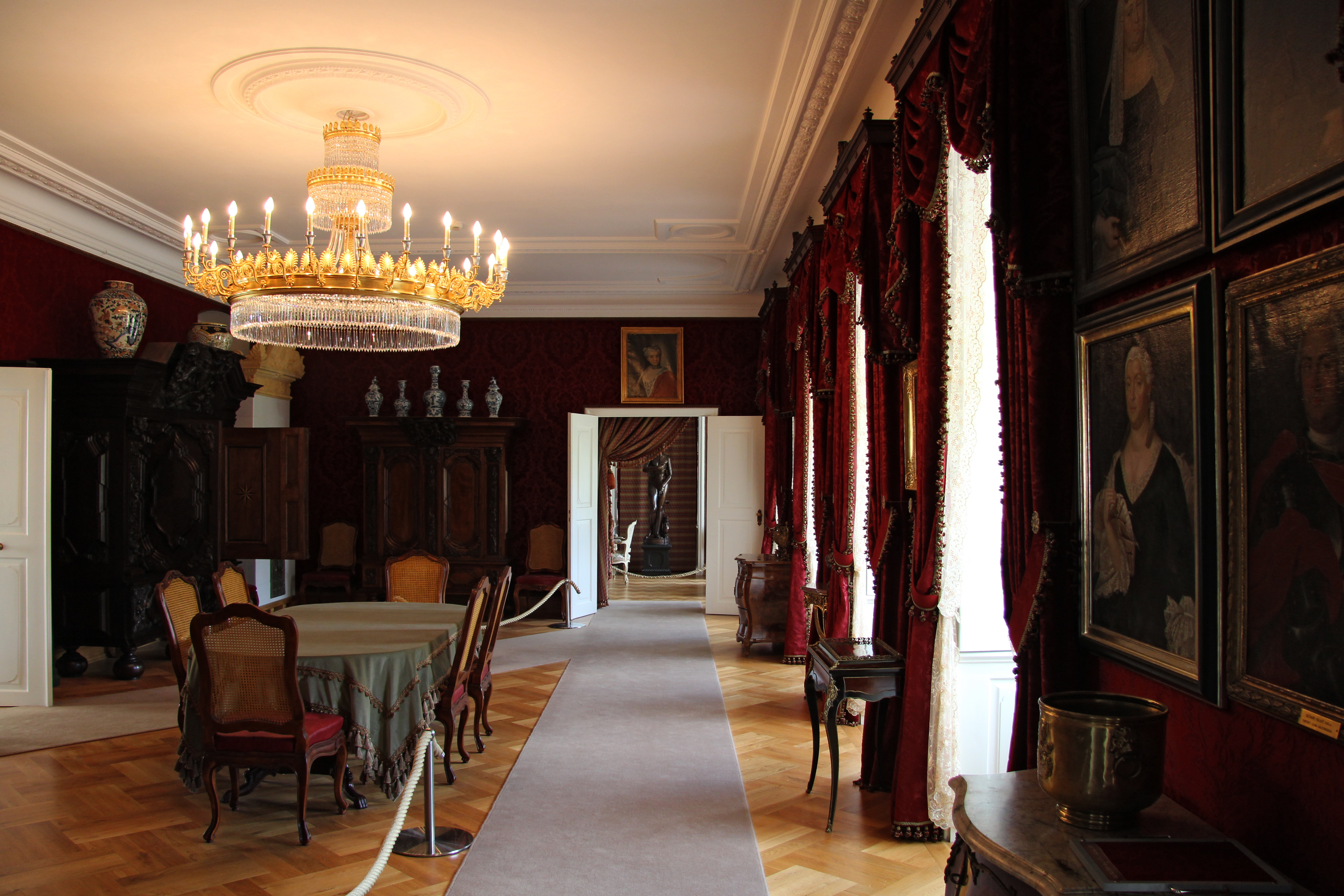
Palace interior

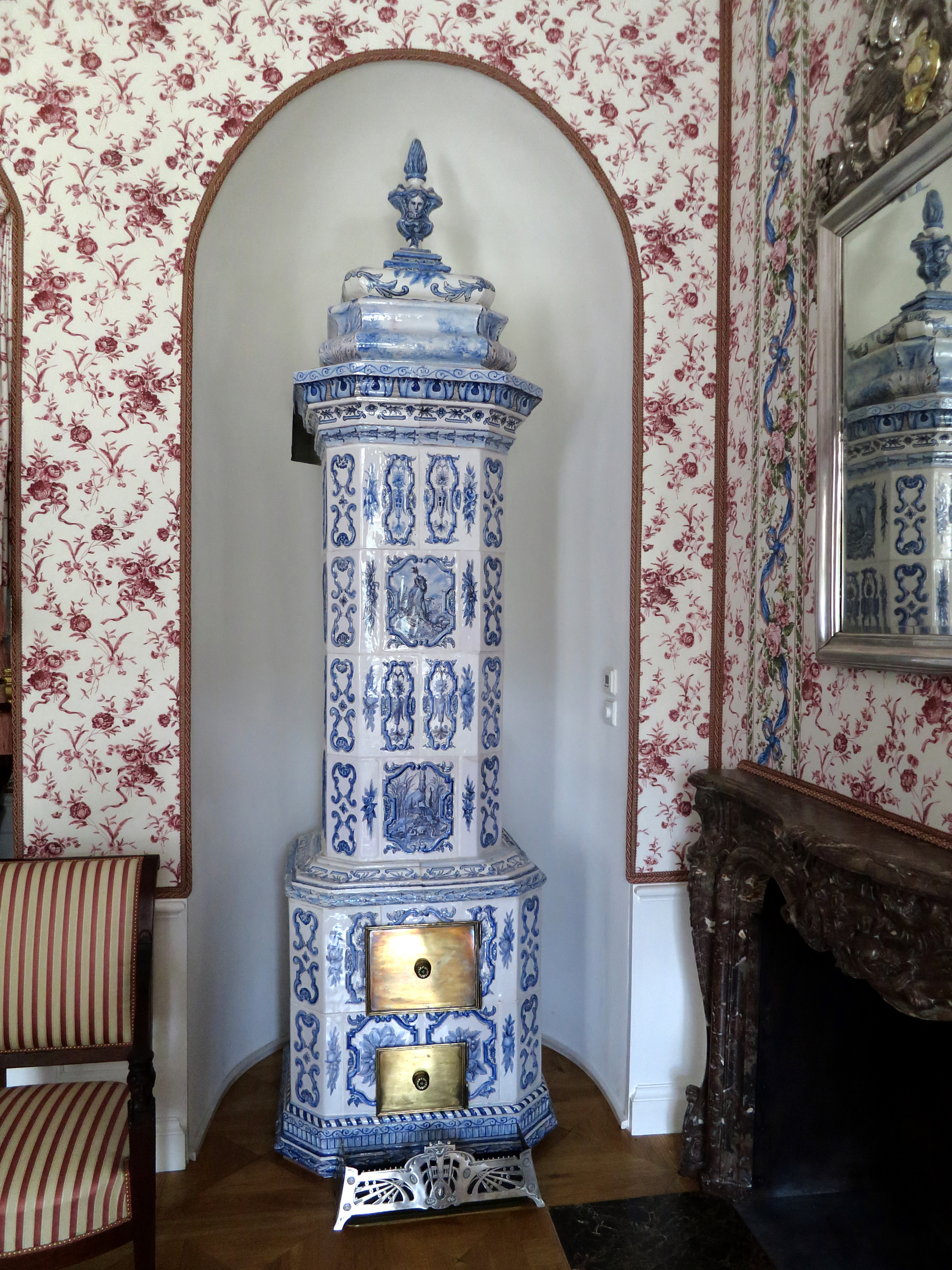
Space heater
