= Bolesławiec (disambiguation) =

Bolesławiec may refer to the following Polish towns:

- Bolesławiec, Greater Poland Voivodeship (west-central Poland)
- Bolesławiec, Łódź Voivodeship (central Poland)
- Bolesławiec in Lower Silesian Voivodeship (south-west Poland)

or the following Polish Gminas (districts):

- Gmina Bolesławiec, Lower Silesian Voivodeship
- Gmina Bolesławiec, Łódź Voivodeship

or the following Polish Powiat (County):

- Bolesławiec County
