= Krosino =

Krosino may refer to:

- Krosino, Łobez County, in West Pomeranian Voivodeship (north-west Poland)
- Krosino, Szczecinek County, in West Pomeranian Voivodeship (north-west Poland)
- Krosino, Świdwin County, in West Pomeranian Voivodeship (north-west Poland)

== See also ==
- Krosinko
- Krosno (disambiguation)
