= Krosno (disambiguation) =

Krosno is a town in south-eastern Poland.

Krosno may also refer to:

- Krosno Odrzańskie, a town in Lubusz Voivodeship (west Poland)
- Krosno, Podlaskie Voivodeship (north-east Poland)
- Krosno, Łódź Voivodeship (central Poland)
- Krosno, Poznań County in Greater Poland Voivodeship (west-central Poland)
- Krosno, Wągrowiec County in Greater Poland Voivodeship (west-central Poland)
- Krosno, Elbląg County in Warmian-Masurian Voivodeship (north Poland)
- Krosno, Lidzbark County in Warmian-Masurian Voivodeship (north Poland)

== See also ==
- Krosino (disambiguation)
