= Nowinki, Greater Poland Voivodeship =

Nowinki
- Village
- Location within Poland
- Coordinates: 52°13′N 16°50′E
- Country: Poland
- Voivodeship: Greater Poland
- County: Poznań
- Gmina: Mosina

Nowinki [nɔˈvinki] is a village in the administrative district of Gmina Mosina, within Poznań County, Greater Poland Voivodeship, in west-central Poland.
