= Borkowice, Greater Poland Voivodeship =

Borkowice
- Village
- Location within Poland
- Coordinates: 52°13′N 16°48′E
- Country: Poland
- Voivodeship: Greater Poland
- County: Poznań
- Gmina: Mosina
- Population (approx.): 204

Borkowice [bɔrkɔˈvit͡sɛ] is a village in the administrative district of Gmina Mosina, within Poznań County, Greater Poland Voivodeship, in west-central Poland.

The village has an approximate population of 204.
