= Drużyna, Greater Poland Voivodeship =

Drużyna
- Village
- Location within Poland
- Coordinates: 52°12′39″N 16°49′35″E
- Country: Poland
- Voivodeship: Greater Poland
- County: Poznań
- Gmina: Mosina
- Population: 492

Drużyna [druˈʐɨna] is a village in the administrative district of Gmina Mosina, within Poznań County, Greater Poland Voivodeship, in west-central Poland.
