= Gmina Mosina =

Gmina Mosina Mosina Commune
- Gmina
- Flag Coat of arms
- Interactive map of Gmina Mosina
- Coordinates (Mosina): 52°14′48″N 16°50′42″E
- Country: Poland
- Voivodeship: Greater Poland
- County: Poznań County
- Seat: Mosina

Area
  - Total: 170.87 km^{2} (65.97 sq mi)

Population (2006)
  - Total: 25,098
  - Density: 146.88/km^{2} (380.43/sq mi)
  - Urban: 12,150
  - Rural: 12,948
- Time zone: UTC+1 (CET)
  - Summer (DST): UTC+2 (CEST)
- Website: http://www.mosina.pl/

Gmina Mosina is an urban-rural gmina (administrative district) in Poznań County, Greater Poland Voivodeship, in west-central Poland. Its seat is the town of Mosina, which lies approximately 18 kilometres (11 mi) south of the regional capital Poznań.

The gmina covers an area of 170.87 square kilometres (66.0 sq mi), and as of 2006 its total population is 25,098 (out of which the population of Mosina amounts to 12,150, and the population of the rural part of the gmina is 12,948).

== Villages ==
Apart from the town of Mosina, Gmina Mosina contains the villages and settlements of Babki, Baranówko, Baranowo, Bogulin, Bolesławiec, Borkowice, Czapury, Daszewice, Drużyna, Głuszyna Leśna, Jeziory, Konstantynowo, Krajkowo, Krosinko, Krosno, Kubalin, Ludwikowo, Mieczewo, Nowe Dymaczewo, Nowinki, Pecna, Radzewice, Rogalin, Rogalinek, Sasinowo, Sowiniec, Sowinki, Stare Dymaczewo, Świątniki, Wiórek and Żabinko.

== Neighbouring gminas ==
Gmina Mosina is bordered by the towns of Luboń, Poznań and Puszczykowo, and by the gminas of Brodnica, Czempiń, Komorniki, Kórnik and Stęszew.
