= Bogulin =

- Settlement
- Location within Poland
- Coordinates: 52°13′19″N 16°52′15″E
- Country: Poland
- Voivodeship: Greater Poland
- County: Poznań
- Gmina: Mosina

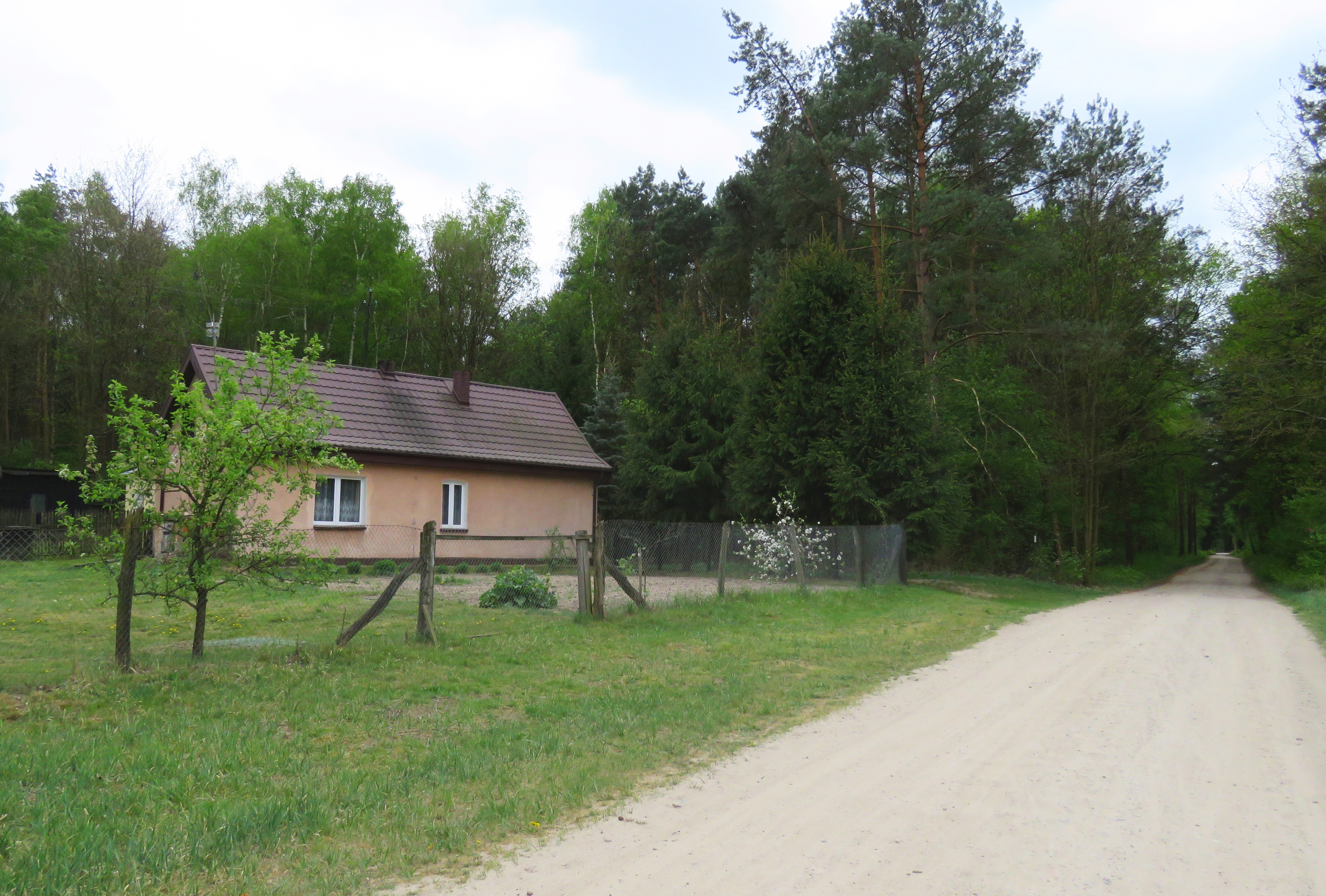

Bogulin [bɔˈɡulin] is a settlement in the administrative district of Gmina Mosina, within Poznań County, Greater Poland Voivodeship, in west-central Poland.
