= Baranówko =

- Village
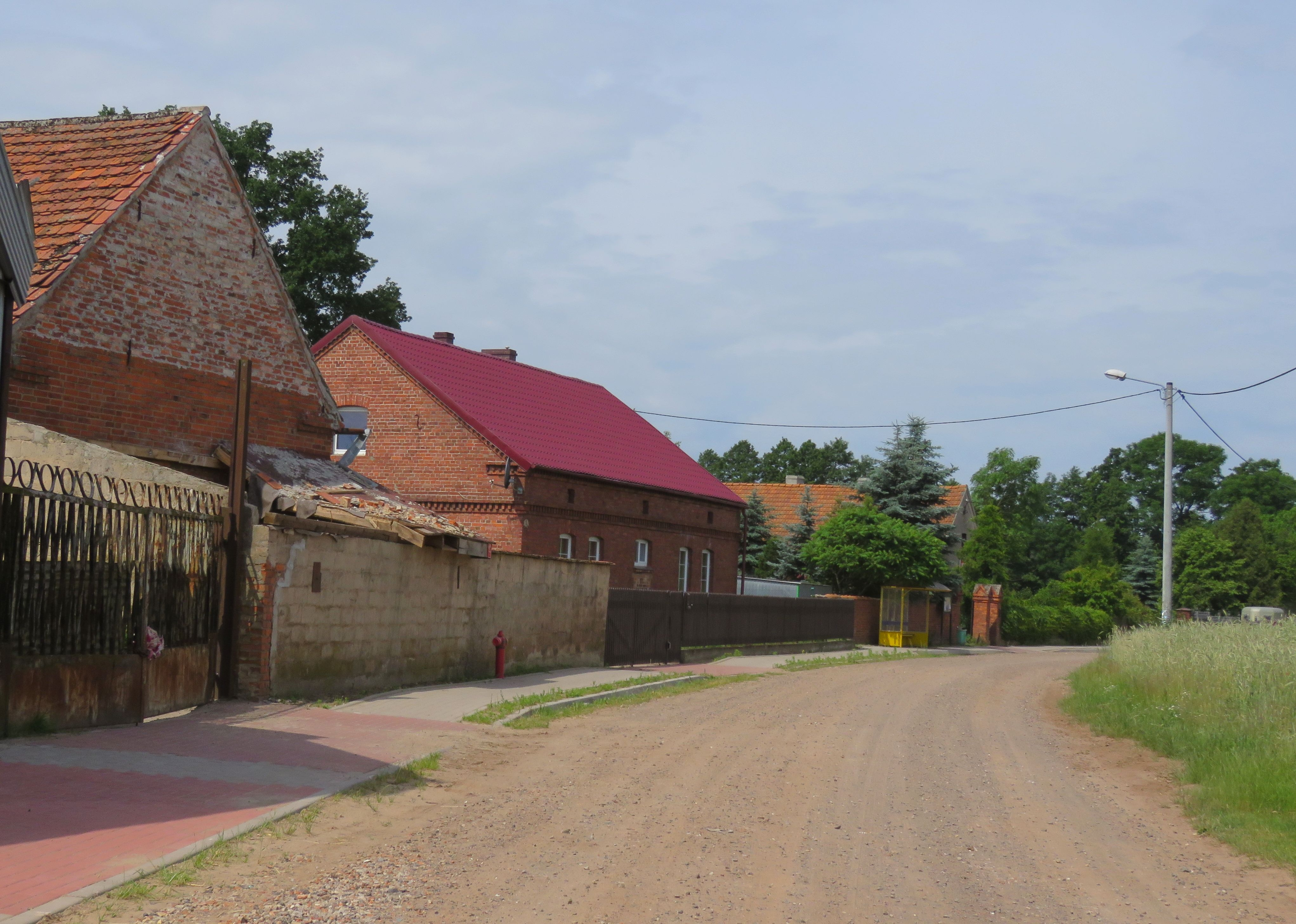

- Location within Poland
- Coordinates: 52°13′N 16°54′E
- Country: Poland
- Voivodeship: Greater Poland
- County: Poznań
- Gmina: Mosina
- Population: 60

Baranówko [baraˈnufkɔ] is a village in the administrative district of Gmina Mosina, within Poznań County, Greater Poland Voivodeship, in west-central Poland.
