= Ludwikowo, Gmina Mosina =

Ludwikowo
- Village
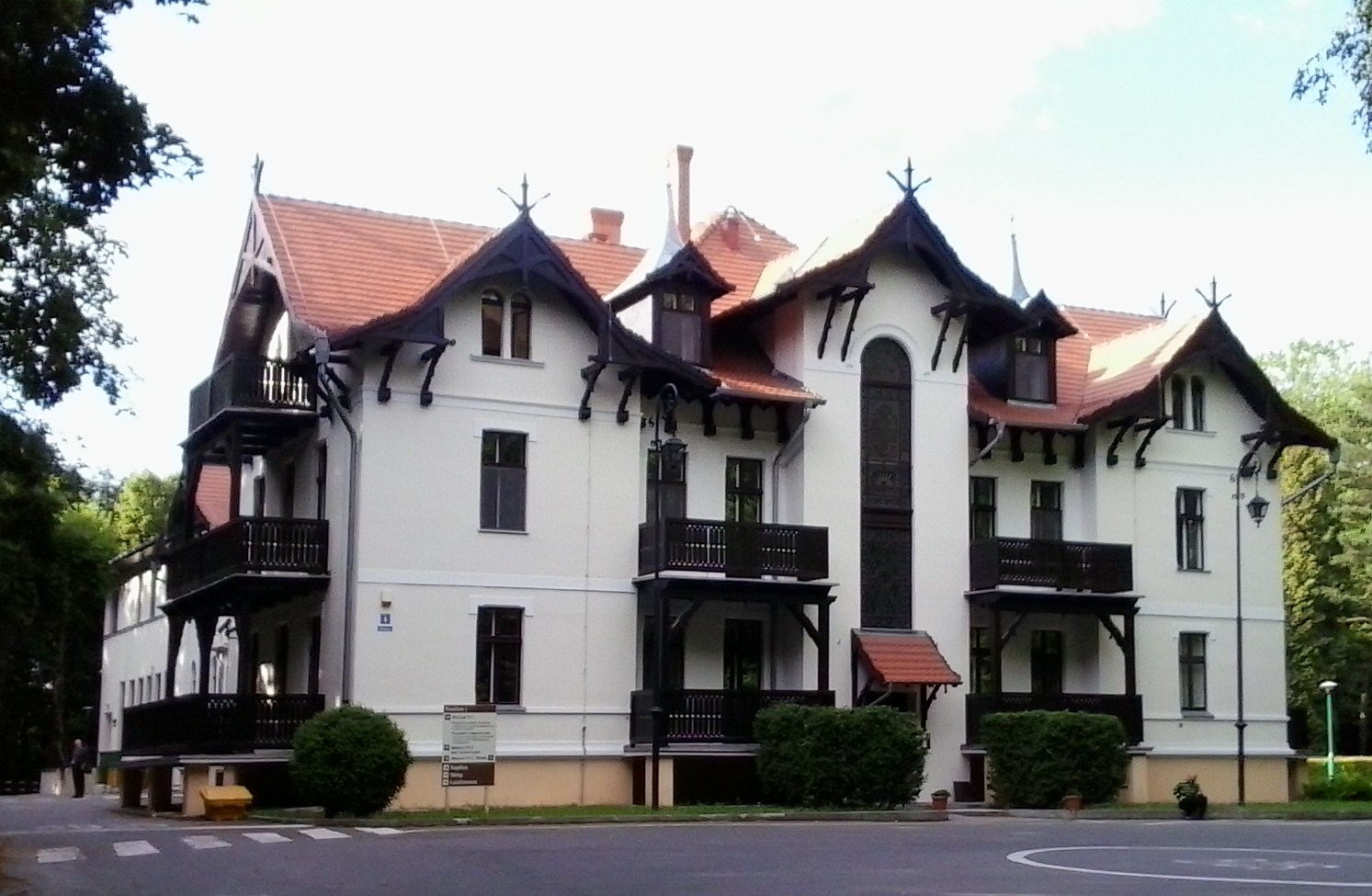
- Sanatorium in Ludwikowo, Gmina Mosina

- Location within Poland
- Coordinates: 52°14′40″N 16°48′46″E
- Country: Poland
- Voivodeship: Greater Poland
- County: Poznań
- Gmina: Mosina

Ludwikowo [ludviˈkɔvɔ] is a village in the administrative district of Gmina Mosina, within Poznań County, Greater Poland Voivodeship, in west-central Poland.
