= Konstantynowo, Poznań County =

Konstantynowo
- Settlement
- Location within Poland
- Coordinates: 52°10′38″N 16°48′19″E
- Country: Poland
- Voivodeship: Greater Poland
- County: Poznań
- Gmina: Mosina

Konstantynowo [kɔnstantɨˈnɔvɔ] is a settlement in the administrative district of Gmina Mosina, within Poznań County, Greater Poland Voivodeship, in west-central Poland.
