= Sowiniec, Greater Poland Voivodeship =

Sowiniec
- Village
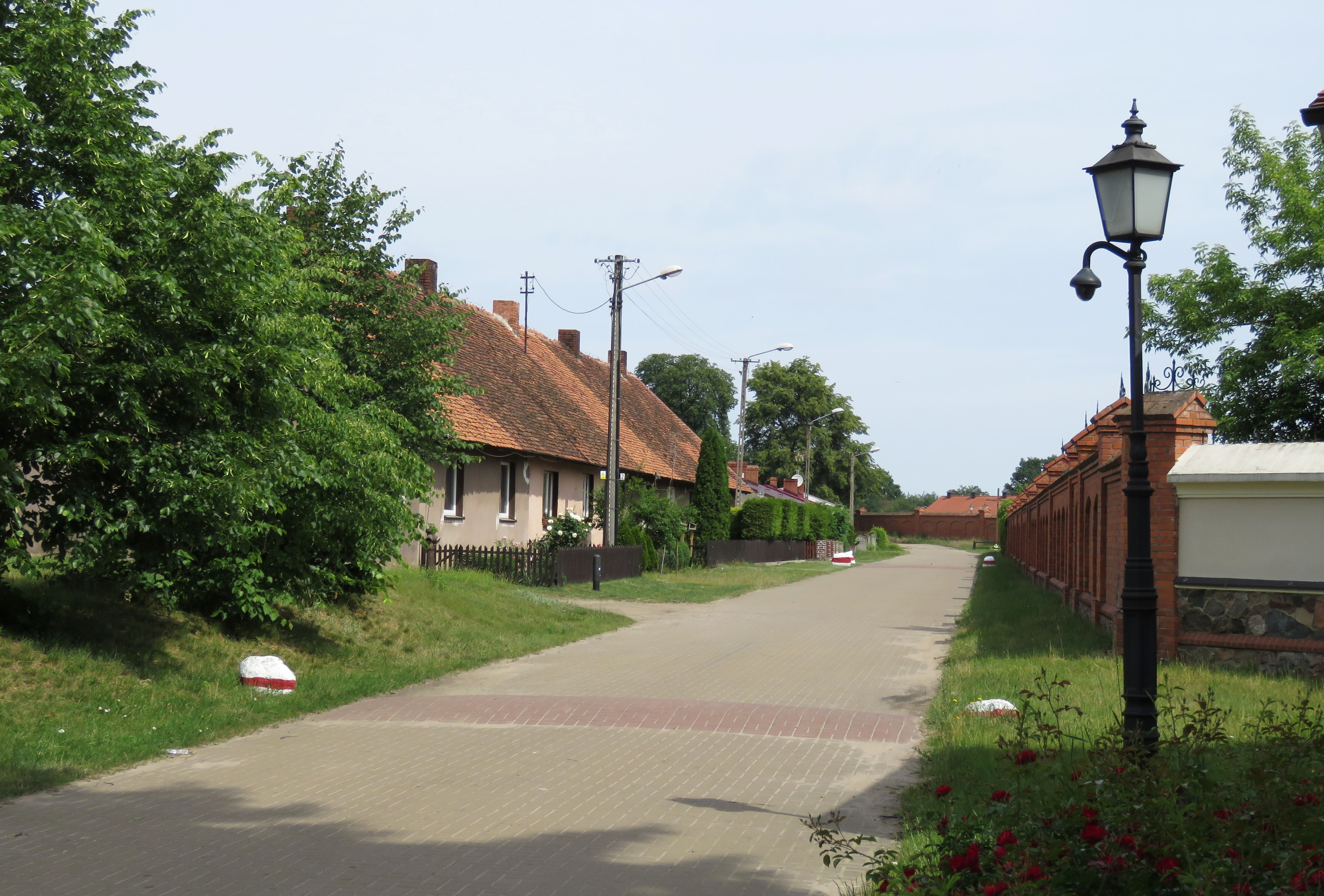

- Location within Poland
- Coordinates: 52°14′20″N 16°52′48″E
- Country: Poland
- Voivodeship: Greater Poland
- County: Poznań
- Gmina: Mosina

Sowiniec [sɔˈviɲɛt͡s] is a village in the administrative district of Gmina Mosina, within Poznań County, Greater Poland Voivodeship, in west-central Poland.
