= Głuszyna Leśna =

- Settlement
- Location within Poland
- Coordinates: 52°17′2″N 16°55′13″E
- Country: Poland
- Voivodeship: Greater Poland
- County: Poznań
- Gmina: Mosina

Głuszyna Leśna [ɡwuˈʂɨna ˈlɛɕna] is a settlement in the administrative district of Gmina Mosina, within Poznań County, Greater Poland Voivodeship, in west-central Poland.
