= Sasinowo =

- Village
- Location within Poland
- Coordinates: 52°16′N 16°54′E
- Country: Poland
- Voivodeship: Greater Poland
- County: Poznań
- Gmina: Mosina

Sasinowo [saɕiˈnɔvɔ] is a village in the administrative district of Gmina Mosina, within Poznań County, Greater Poland Voivodeship, in west-central Poland.
