= Kubalin =

- Settlement
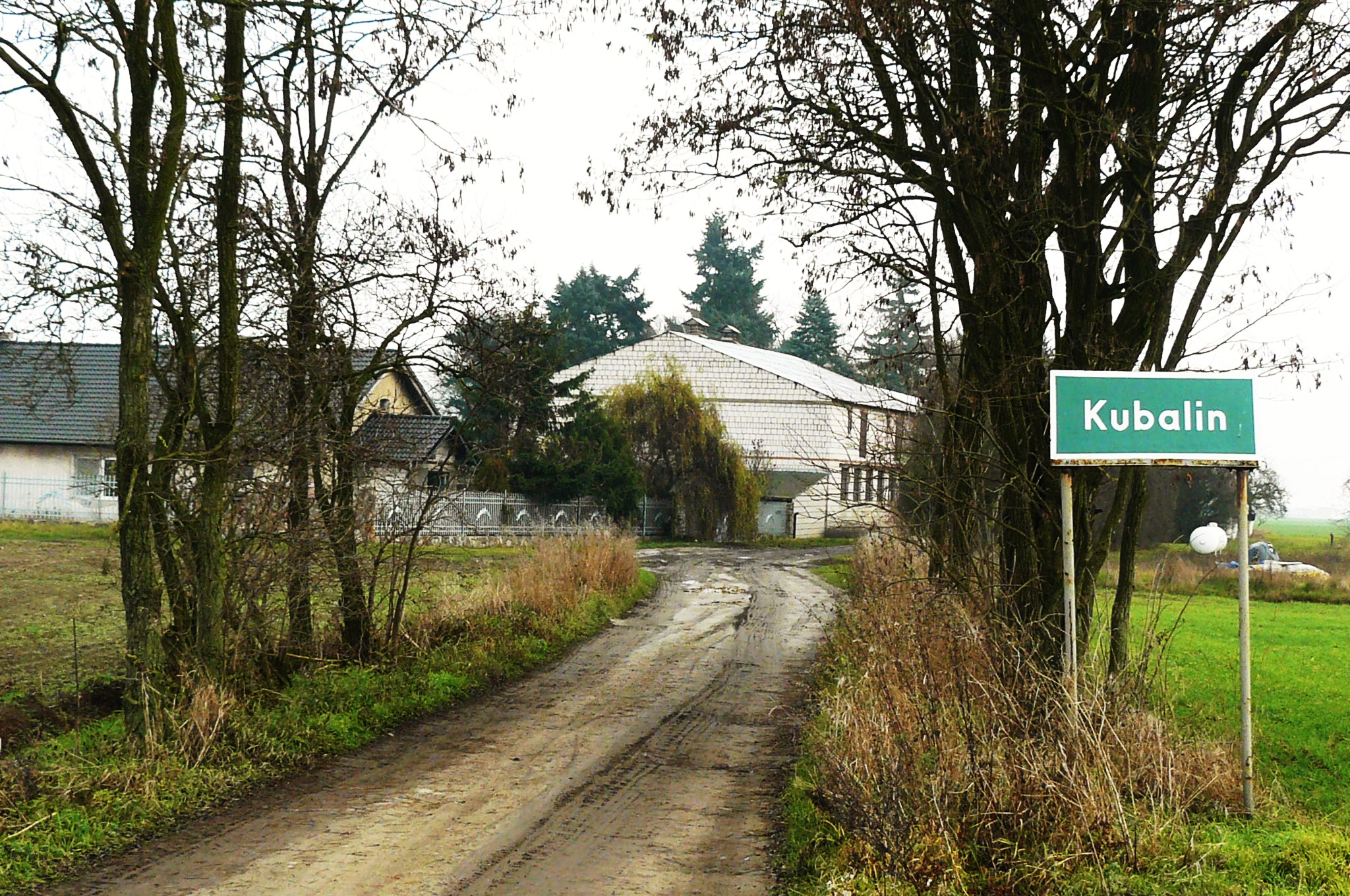
- Kubalin

- Location within Poland
- Coordinates: 52°17′37″N 16°55′55″E
- Country: Poland
- Voivodeship: Greater Poland
- County: Poznań
- Gmina: Mosina

Kubalin [kuˈbalin] is a settlement in the administrative district of Gmina Mosina, within Poznań County, Greater Poland Voivodeship, in west-central Poland.
