= Stare Dymaczewo =

- Village
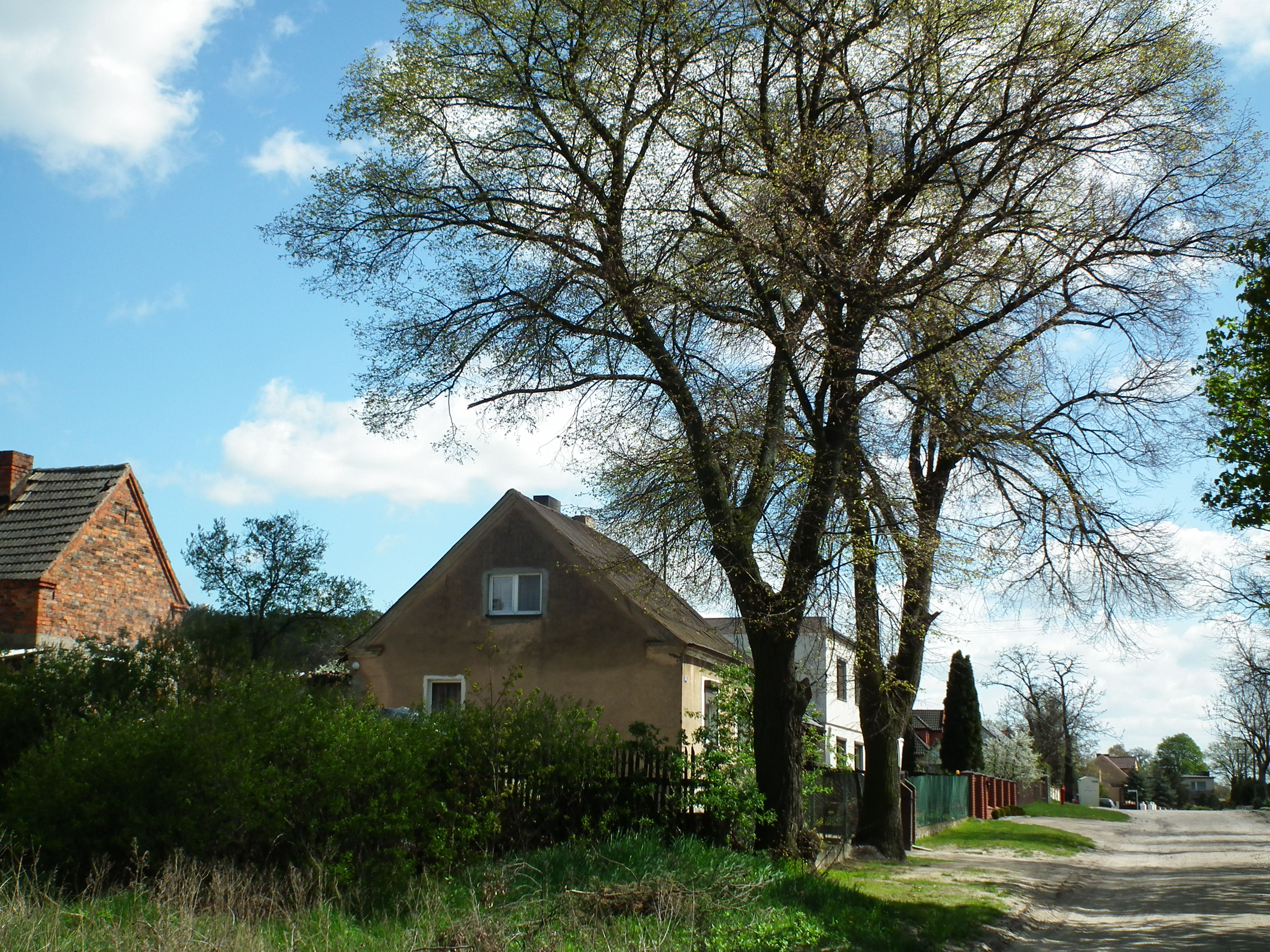

- Location within Poland
- Coordinates: 52°13′46″N 16°46′44″E
- Country: Poland
- Voivodeship: Greater Poland
- County: Poznań
- Gmina: Mosina
- Population: 250

Stare Dymaczewo [ˈstarɛ dɨmaˈt͡ʂɛvɔ] is a village in the administrative district of Gmina Mosina, within Poznań County, Greater Poland Voivodeship, in west-central Poland.
