= Krosno, Poznań County =

Krosno
- Village
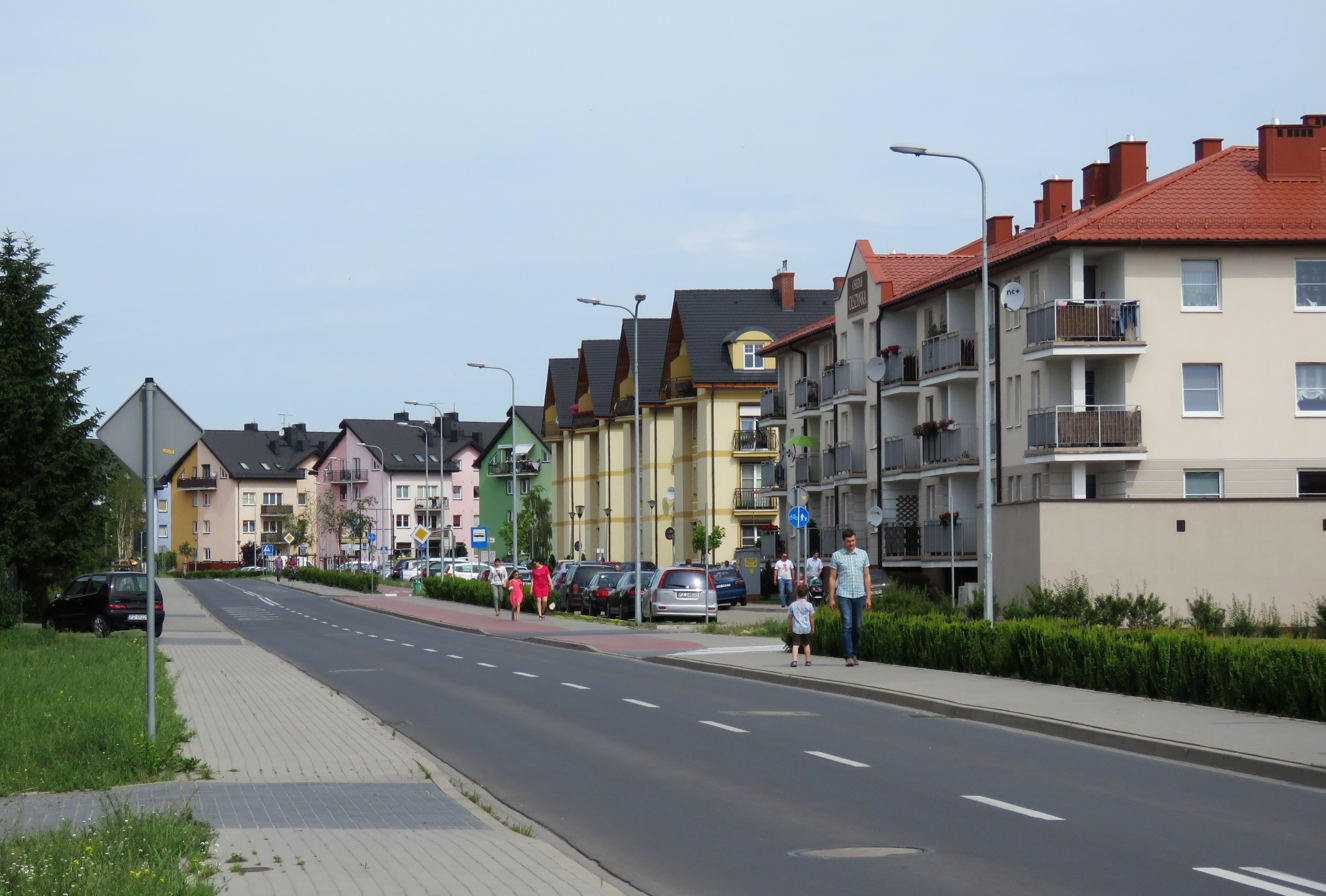

- Location within Poland
- Coordinates: 52°14′N 16°50′E
- Country: Poland
- Voivodeship: Greater Poland
- County: Poznań
- Gmina: Mosina

Krosno [ˈkrɔsnɔ] is a village in the administrative district of Gmina Mosina, within Poznań County, Greater Poland Voivodeship, in west-central Poland.
