= Krosinko, Greater Poland Voivodeship =

Krosinko
- Village
- Location within Poland
- Coordinates: 52°15′N 16°50′E
- Country: Poland
- Voivodeship: Greater Poland
- County: Poznań
- Gmina: Mosina

Krosinko [krɔˈɕinkɔ] is a village in the administrative district of Gmina Mosina, within Poznań County, Greater Poland Voivodeship, in west-central Poland.
