= Mieczewo =

- Village
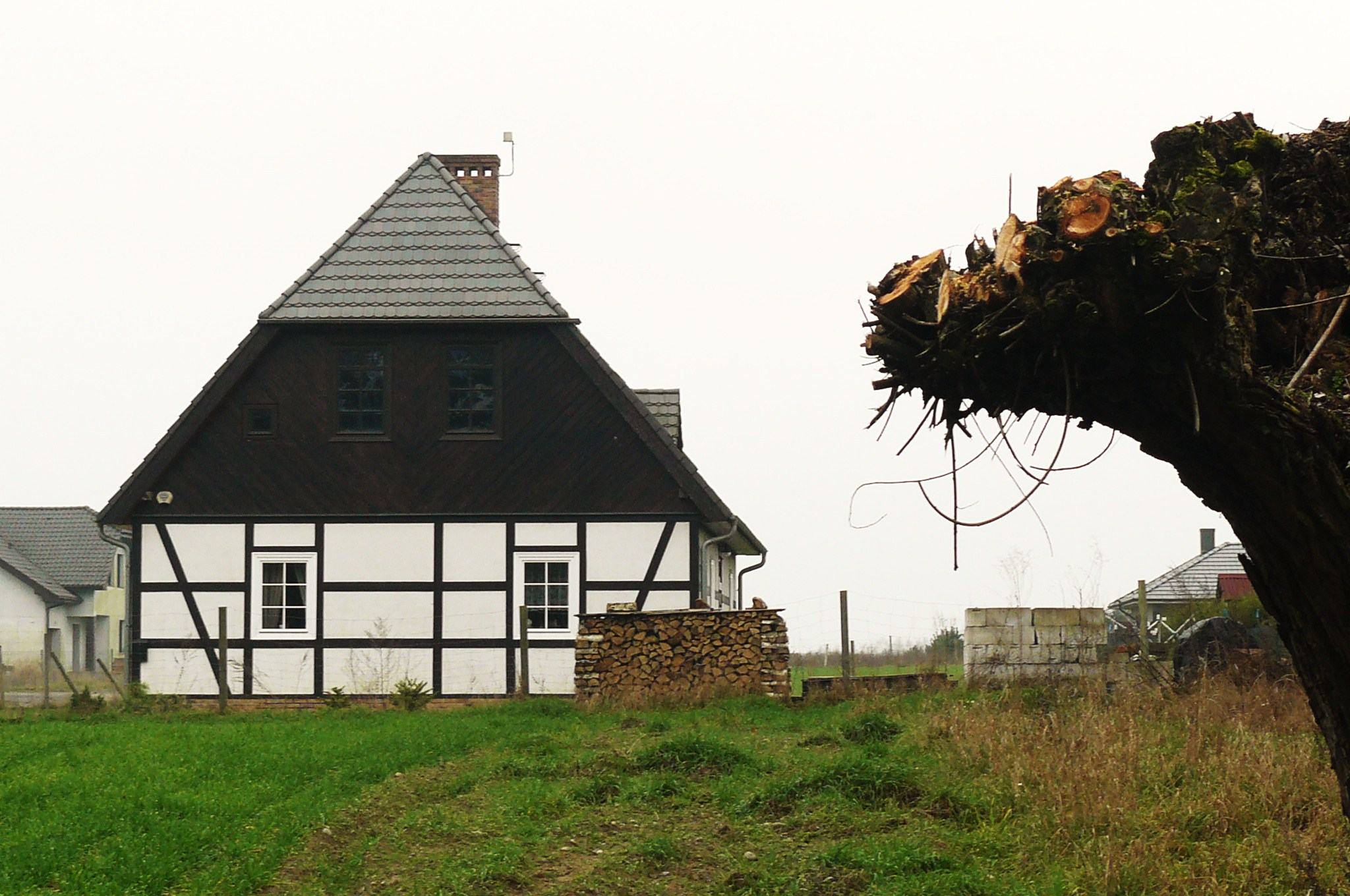

- Location within Poland
- Coordinates: 52°14′24″N 17°0′13″E
- Country: Poland
- Voivodeship: Greater Poland
- County: Poznań
- Gmina: Mosina
- Population: 580

Mieczewo [mjɛˈt͡ʂɛvɔ] is a village in the administrative district of Gmina Mosina, within Poznań County, Greater Poland Voivodeship, in west-central Poland.

The village exists at least since the 13th century. Before the late 14th century, a parish was established there. According to historical records, in 1510 the parish included Dobiertki, Góra, Czołowo and Ożyczewo, which no longer exists. In 1614 all the villages became a part of the Bnin parish, and in 1639 the ruined church in Mieczewo was demolished.

In the late 19th century, the village was composed of 38 farms, with 455 inhabitants. At least 30 people from this village emigrated to Michigan at that time.

Currently the village has a population of about 500.
