= Bolesławiec, Greater Poland Voivodeship =

Bolesławiec
- Village
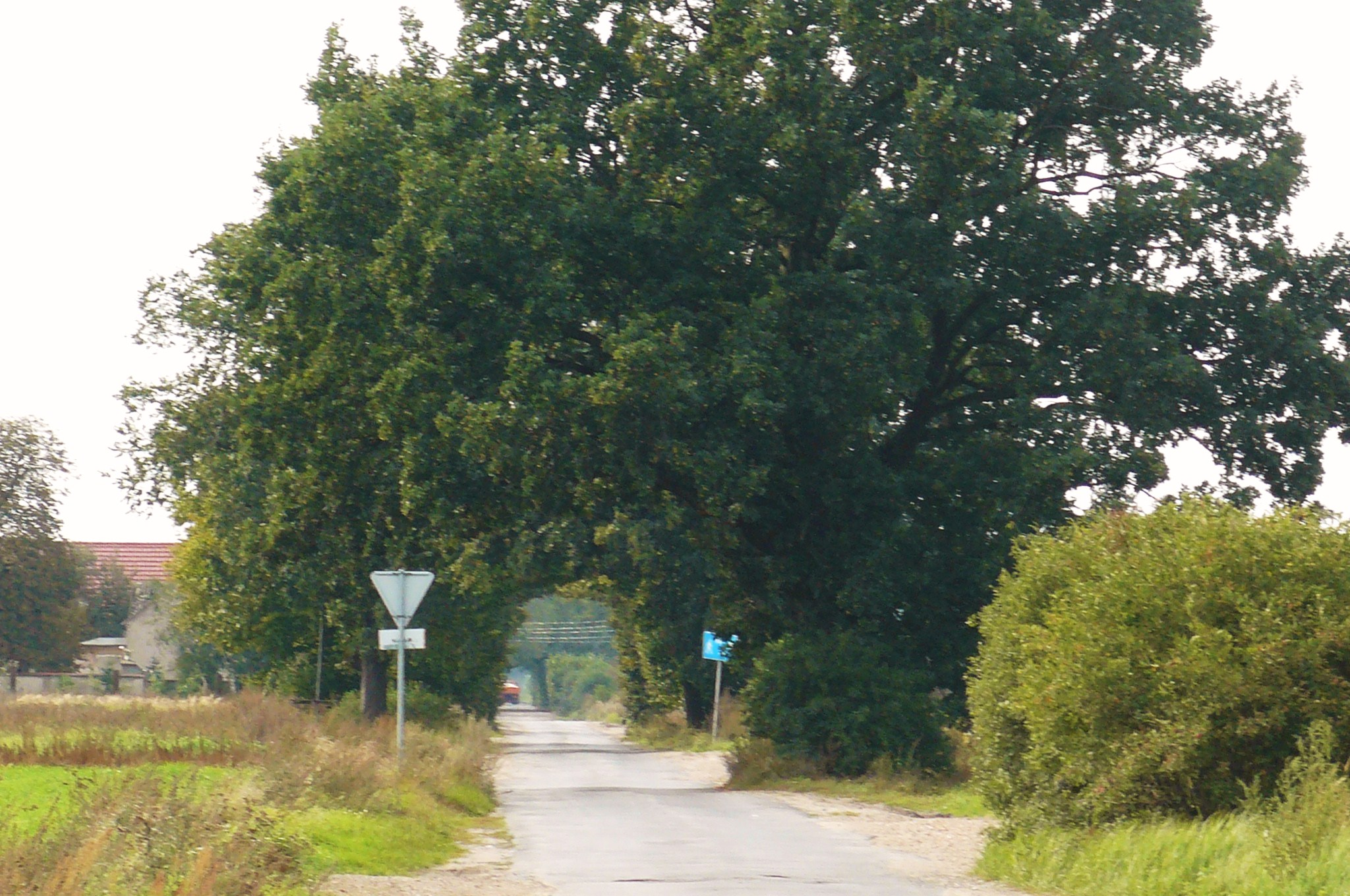

- Location within Poland
- Coordinates: 52°12′46″N 16°46′32″Eplwiki
- Country: Poland
- Voivodeship: Greater Poland
- County: Poznań
- Gmina: Mosina
- Elevation: 64 m (210 ft)
- Population (approx.): 60

Bolesławiec [bɔlɛˈswavjɛt͡s] is a village in the administrative district of Gmina Mosina, within Poznań County, Greater Poland Voivodeship, in west-central Poland.

The village has an approximate population of 60.
