= Babki, Greater Poland Voivodeship =

Babki
- Village
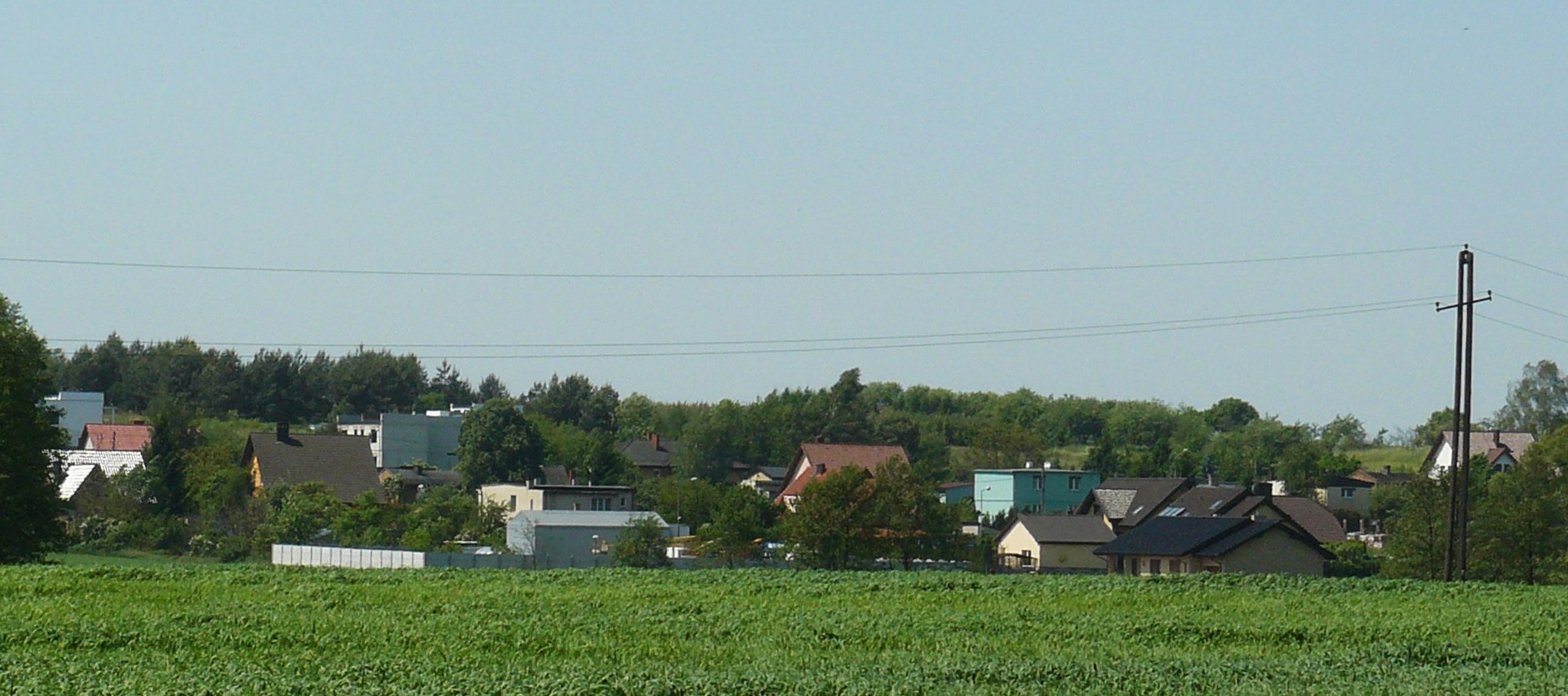

- Location within Poland
- Coordinates: 52°19′N 16°56′E
- Country: Poland
- Voivodeship: Greater Poland
- County: Poznań
- Gmina: Mosina
- Population: 350
- Time zone: UTC+1 (CET)
  - Summer (DST): UTC+2 (CEST)
- Vehicle registration: PZ
- Primary airport: Poznań–Ławica Airport

Babki [ˈbapki] is a village in the administrative district of Gmina Mosina, within Poznań County, Greater Poland Voivodeship, in west-central Poland. It is located in the historic region of Greater Poland.
