= Rogalinek =

- Village
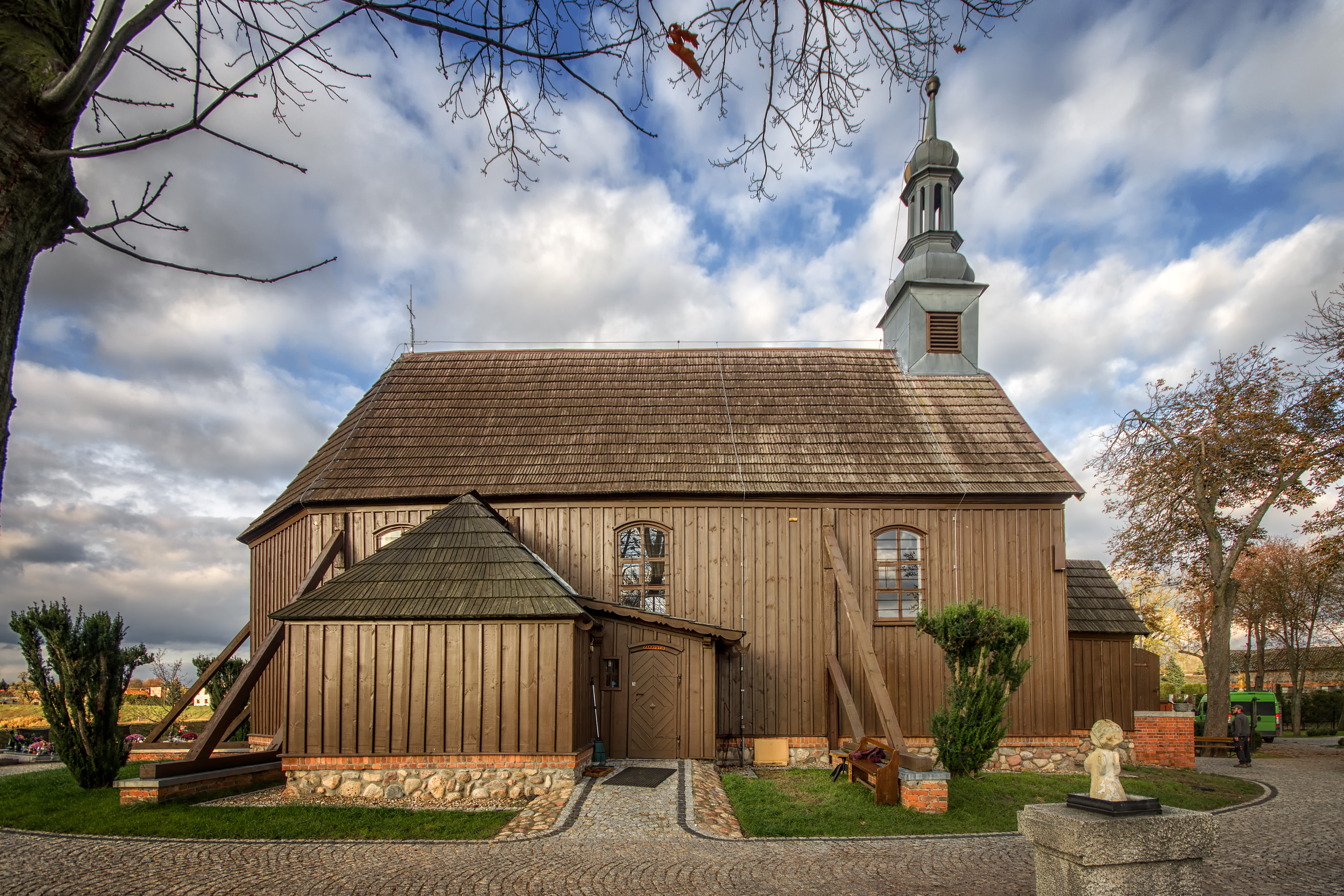
- Church of Saint Michael Archangel and Our Lady Help of Christians

- Location within Poland
- Coordinates: 52°15′N 16°54′E
- Country: Poland
- Voivodeship: Greater Poland
- County: Poznań
- Gmina: Mosina

Population (approx.)
  - Total: 1,501

Rogalinek [rɔɡaˈlinɛk] is a village in the administrative district of Gmina Mosina, within Poznań County, Greater Poland Voivodeship, in west-central Poland.
