= Kamionki, Greater Poland Voivodeship =

Kamionki
- Village
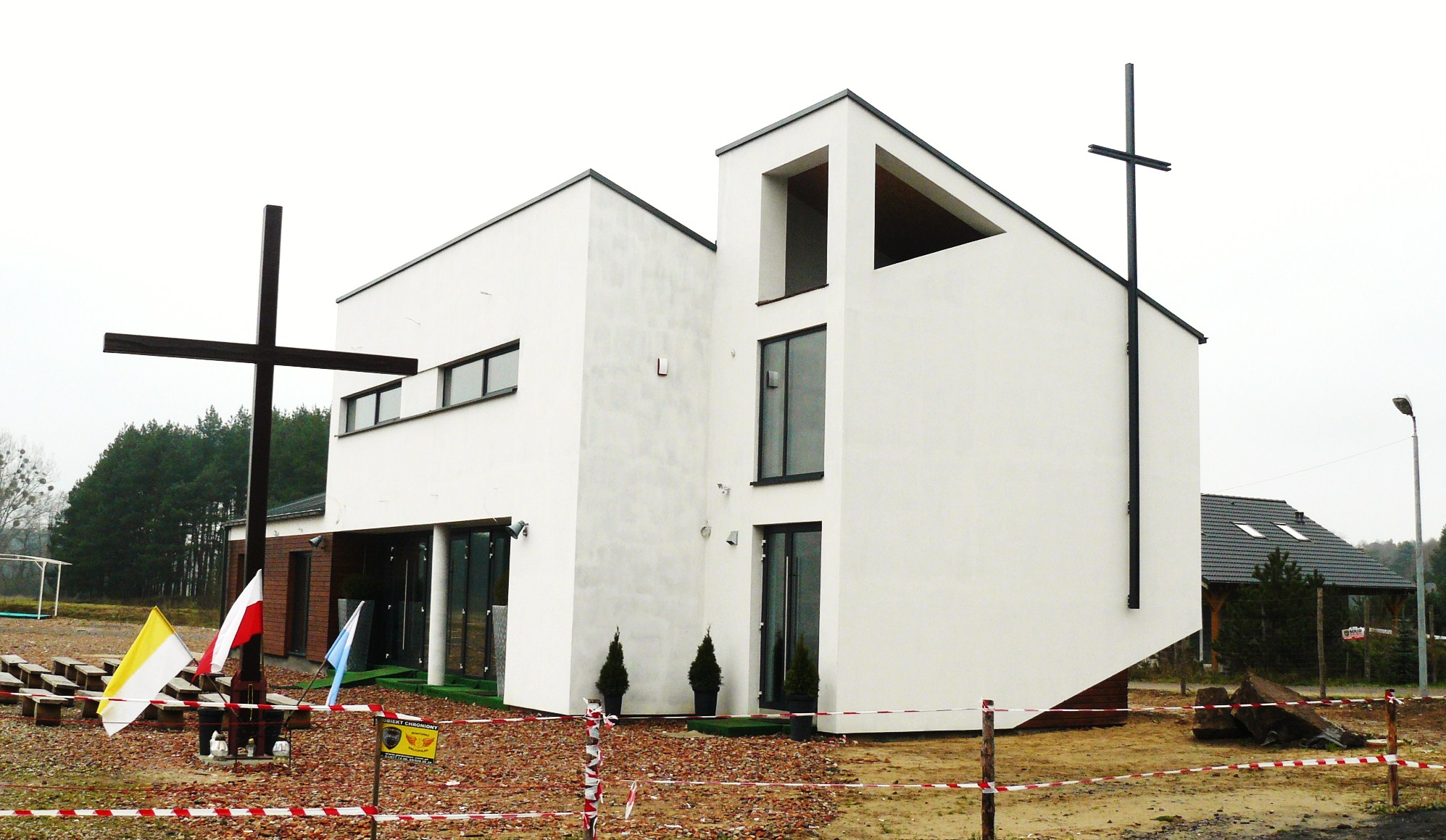
- Kamionki Church of Mother Teresa of Calcutta

- Location within Poland
- Coordinates (Kórnik Commute): 52°17′N 16°59′E
- Country: Poland
- Voivodeship: Greater Poland
- County: Poznań
- Gmina: Kórnik
- Elevation: 80 m (260 ft)
- Population: 5,830
- Postal code: 62023

Kamionki [kaˈmjɔnki] is a village in the administrative district of Gmina Kórnik, situated in Poznań County, Greater Poland Voivodeship, in west-central Poland.
