= Posner (surname) =

Posner is a surname of German origin, meaning "a person from the city of Posen", now Poznań in Poland. It is a fairly common surname among Ashkenazi Jews. Variants of the name are Posener and Pozner. Notable people with the surname include:

- Aaron Posner, American playwright and stage director
- Ari Posner (born 1970), Canadian film and television music composer
- Barry Posner (physician) (born 1937), Canadian physician and research scientist
- Barry Posner (leadership scholar) (born 1949), American academic
- Carl Posner (1854–1928), German urologist
- Daniel Posner, American political scientist
- David M. Posner (1947–2018), American rabbi
- David Posner, fictional character in the Alan Bennett play The History Boys
- Donald Posner (1931–2005), American art historian and author
- Ed Posner (1933–1993), American information theorist and neural network researcher
- Elieser Posner (born 1937), American grain scientist
- Eric Posner (born 1965), American jurist and academic
- Ernst Posner (1892–1980), Prussian state archivist
- Gary H. Posner (1943–2018), American chemist
- Geoff Posner (born 1949), British producer of television and radio comedy
- Gerald Posner (born 1954), American journalist and author
- Henry Posner III (born 1955), American investor and rail entrepreneur
- Herbert A. Posner (1925–2018), American politician from New York
- Jerome B. Posner (born 1932), American neurologist
- Kenneth Posner, American lighting designer
- Lindsay Posner (born 1959), British theatre director
- Michael Posner (economist) (1931–2006), British economist and academic
- Michael Posner (journalist) (born 1947), Canadian journalist and biographer
- Michael Posner (lawyer) (born 1950), American lawyer, human rights activist, federal official
- Michael Posner (psychologist) (born 1936), American psychologist
- Mike Posner (born 1988), American rapper,
- Neal Pozner (1955–1994), sometimes credited as Neil Pozner, art director, editor, and writer known for his work in the comic book industry
- Rebecca Posner (1929–2018), British philologist, linguist and academic
- Richard Posner (1939–2026), American judge and jurist
- Roland Posner (1942–2020), German semiotician and linguist
- Ruth Posner (1929–2025), Polish-British actress, dancer and choreographer
- Sarah Posner, American journalist and author
- Seymour Posner (1925–1988), American politician
- Steven Posner (1943–2010), American corporate raider
- Tess Posner, American social entrepreneur and musician
- Tracy Posner (born 1962), American actress, animal rights rescuer and activist
- Trisha Posner (born 1951), British non-fiction writer, wife of Gerald Posner
- Victor Posner (1918–2002), American entrepreneur, father of Tracy
- Vladimir Pozner Jr. (born 1934), French-born Russian-American journalist and broadcaster
- Vladimir Pozner Sr. (1908–1975), Soviet spy
- Vladimir Pozner (writer) (1905–1992), French writer and translator, cousin of Vladimir Pozner Sr.
- Walter Posner (born 1953), German football player
- Zalman I. Posner (1927–2014), American rabbi and writer

== See also ==
- Posener
- Posen
