= Slavic influence on Romanian =

Influence of the Slavic languages on the Romanian language

The Slavic influence on Romanian is noticeable on all linguistic levels: lexis, phonetics, morphology and syntax.

== Overview ==
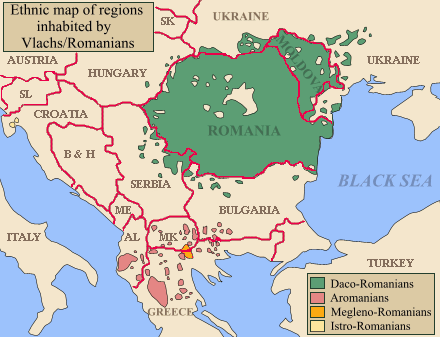
Geographical distribution of the four Eastern Romance variants in the early 20th century

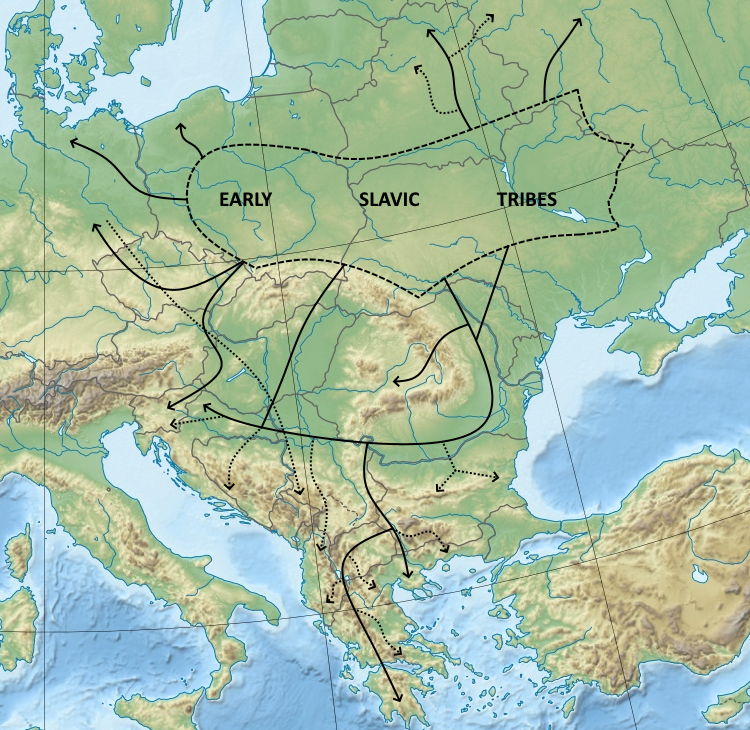
Migration of early Slavs in Europe in the 6th–7th centuries

Romanian (or Daco-Romanian), Aromanian, Megleno-Romanian and Istro-Romanian form the Eastern Romance branch of the Romance languages. The four languages are descended from a common ancestor developed from the Vulgar Latin spoken in southeastern Europe during Classical Antiquity. The territory where the language formed was a large one, consisting of both the north and the south of the Danube (encompassing the regions of Dacia, Moesia, and possibly Illyria), more precisely to the north of the Jiriček Line. Proto-Slavic—the root from which the modern Slavic languages developed—emerged during the first half of the 2nd millennium BC. The Early Slavs lived in the plains north of the Carpathian Mountains or along the middle course of the Dnieper River. Their expansion accelerated after the fall of the Hunnic Empire in the middle of the 5th century AD. Significant Slavic-speaking groups moved across the Lower Danube and settled in the Balkan Peninsula. By the end of the 7th century, Slavic became the dominant language throughout most of the Balkans. Studies of the South Slavic languages revealed that Bulgarian and Serbian developed for centuries in two distant territories, separated by significant non-Slavic groups.

It is unclear when contact began among the Early Slavs and speakers of Common Romanian. According to one scholarly theory, the Romance-speaking communities had already come into contact with the Slavs in the 5th or 6th centuries. To explain the lack of early Slav loanwords in Romanian, linguist Kim Schulte claims that the "contact situation can be assumed to have been one of cohabitation and regular interaction between Romanians and Slavs, without a great degree of cultural dominance of either of the two". In contrast, linguist Gottfried Schramm proposes that the Romanians' ancestors lived in the mountains, surrounded by Albanian-speaking communities and thus separated from the Slavs of the lowlands until the 10th century. Otherwise, he continues, the fact that Slavic loanwords appeared in Albanian earlier than in Romanian could hardly be explained.

Contacts with Slavic-speaking groups intensified before the disintegration of Common Romanian and about 80 Slavic loanwords are still present in all four Eastern Romance variants. The high number of Slavic loanwords and the shared morphological and syntactical elements of Romanian and Bulgarian show that modern Romanian developed from the tongue of a mixed, bilingual population and through frequent intermarriages. According to another scholarly approach, these elements do not reveal a widespread bilingualism or "racial intermixture", being the consequence of "cultural intercourse" deriving from the bilingualism of the literary class.

Romanians adopted Old Church Slavonic as the language of liturgy, which gave it the "status of a cultural superstate language, particularly in semantic fields related to religious beliefs and practices". Greek Catholic (or Uniate) priests were the first Romanian intellectuals to make efforts to demonstrate the Latin origin of Romanian in Transylvania during the 18th century. They developed a Latin-based alphabet to replace the Cyrillic writing system and promoted the use of Latin terms in place of words of Slavic origin. Wallachian writers started to advance the adoption of loanwords from Romance languages (especially from French and Italian) in the 19th century.

== Vocabulary ==
=== Loanwords ===
Although the Re-latinization of Romanian created synonyms to, or replaced a number of Slavic and other loanwords in the 19th century, about 20% of the Romanian vocabulary is still of Slavic origin. The earliest Slavic loanwords which became part of the basic vocabulary are the most likely to have survived. For instance, prag ("threshold"), nevastă ("wife") and rai ("heaven") survived, but postelnic ("chamberlain") disappeared.

Romanians adopted Slavic loanwords in three chronological stages: firstly from Proto-Slavic, then from a South Slavic language (associated with Old Church Slavonic), and finally from individual Slavic languages of Southeastern, Central and Eastern Europe. Certain Slavic terms were borrowed twice: both the popular verb a sfârși and the educated form a săvârși derives from the Slavic term for "finish, complete" (sŭvŭršiti). About 80 loanwords contain the Proto-Slavic *TorT-syllable before it underwent radical changes during the formation of Slavic languages. This old syllable began with a consonant, which was followed by the vowel e or o and the consonant r or l, with a consonant closing the syllable. The Romanian word for hillock (măgură) was likely also borrowed from a reconstructed Proto-Slavic *măgula form. Romanian adopted most Slavic loanwords after the change of the original *TorT-syllables was completed in the South Slavic languages in the middle of the 9th century. The third phase of the adoption of Slavic loanwords started after the dissolution of Common Romanian. During this stage, the speakers of particular dialects started to borrow terms from the neighboring Slavic peoples. Ukrainian, Polish and Russian influenced the 13th century Daco-Romanian dialects of Moldavia and Maramureș; Serbian loanwords appeared in the Daco-Romanian variants of Banat and Crișana; Bulgarian influenced the Wallachian dialects of Daco-Romanian; Istro-Romanian was exposed to a strong Croatian influence for centuries; while Aromanian and Megleno-Romanian were strongly influenced by Bulgarian and Macedonian.

Studies determined that about 16.5% of the nouns, 14% of the verbs (most of which have the fourth conjugation form), 11.8% of the adjectives, 20% of the adverbs and 1.6% of the function words were borrowed from Slavic languages. The ratio of Slavic loanwords is especially high in the religious vocabulary (25%) and in the semantic field of social and political relations (22.5%). Slavic loanwords make up more than 10% of the Romanian terms related to speech and language, to basic actions and technology, to time, to the physical world, to possession and to motion. Some loanwords were used to name new objects or concepts. For instance, Slavic loanwords in the Romanian vocabulary of agriculture show either the adoption of the Slavs' advanced agricultural technology by the Romanians, or the transformation of their way of life from mobile pastoralism to a sedentary agriculture. Other loanwords replaced inherited Latin terms. For instance, it is unlikely that the Romanian ancestors had no term for love even if a iubi ("to love") is a Slavic loanword. In some cases, certain dialects retained inherited Latin terms which were replaced by Slavic loanwords in standard Romanian. For example, the inherited Latin term for snow (nea) is only used regionally or in poems, while standard Romanian prefers zăpadă and omăt which were borrowed from Slavic languages. Most Slavic loanwords are connected to situations which stir up emotions, including dragă ("dear") and slab ("weak"). According to Robert A. Hall, originally Slavic-speaking individuals spread these emotive terms, because they continued to use them even when they were talking in Romanian. Schulte notes that "in antonym pairs with one element borrowed from Slavic, there is an intriguing tendency for the Slavic word to be the one with more positive connotation". For instance, Slavic a iubi ("to love") against inherited a urî ("to hate"), and Slavic prieten ("friend") against Turkic dușman ("enemy"). The extent of this borrowing is such that some scholars once mistakenly viewed Romanian as a Slavic language.

The influence of Romania's Slavic neighbors on the language continued. The Russian influence was intensified in Bessarabia after it was handed over to the Russian Empire and becoming a Soviet Republic. Russian was used in relations with citizens from other parts of the Soviet Union. The effort to establish a Moldovan identity as part of a Romanian one included trying to form a Moldovan standard language, with more Russian loans and reviving archaic words of Slavic origin.

=== Loan translations ===
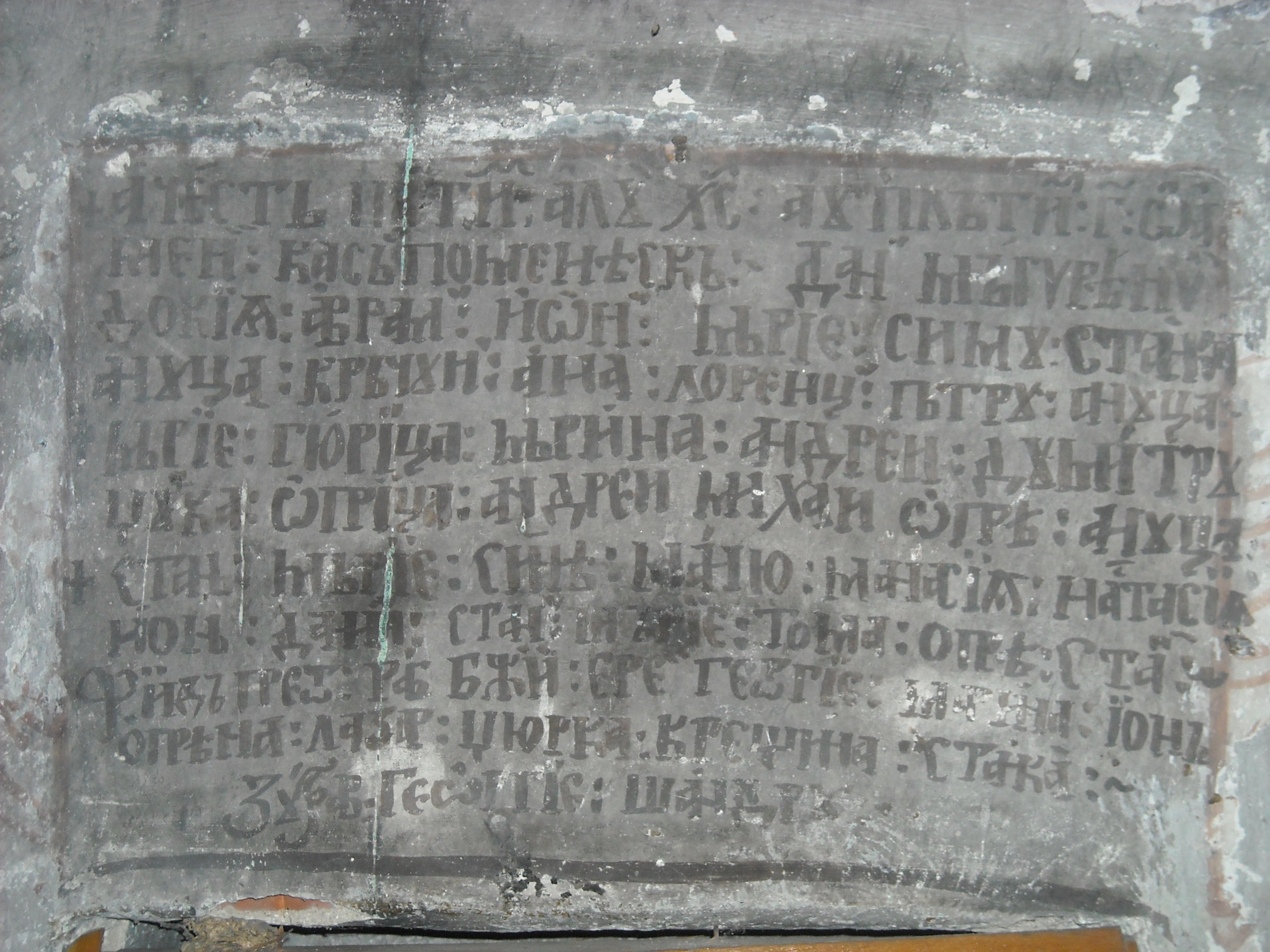
Plaque commemorating the founders of the Romanian Orthodox church in Streisângeorgiu, written in Church Slavonic

Calques (or loan translations) from Slavic languages can also be detected in Romanian. For example, the double meaning of Slavic svĕtŭ (meaning both world and light) gave rise to the development of Romanian lume ("world") from Latin lumen ("light"). The semantic development of certain inherited Latin words was due to Slavic influence. For instance, the Latin word for life (vita) developed into the Romanian term for cattle (vită) following the pattern of Old Church Slavonic životŭ ("being" and "animal").

The structure of Romanian numerals from eleven to nineteen also reflects Slavic influence, according to most linguists' view. In these numerals, the unit digit is followed by the prepositional element spre ("on", evolved from Latin super, meaning "above") before the decad digit: unsprezece ("one-on-ten"), doisprezece ("two-on-ten"), nouăsprezece ("nine-on-ten"). The same pattern is common in all Slavic languages, but it is also present in Albanian and a similar structure exists in Hungarian. The structure of the Romanian decades above ten follows a digit-decad system: douăzeci ("two-tens" for 20), treizeci ("three-tens" for 30) and patruzeci ("four-tens" for 40). Old Church Slavonic displayed the same transparent structure and it can also be detected in modern Slavic languages.

=== Affixes ===
More than 17% of the prefixes (about 15 morphemes) were borrowed from Slavonic languages, but four-fifths of these morphemes are unproductive. Slavic prefixes that are similar to prefixes inherited from Latin are the most productive. This category includes ne- and prea-: for instance, nemică ("nothing") preserved a Latin prefix, but necinstit ("dishonest") contains a prefix borrowed from Slavic. A third prefix, răz-, also belongs to this group, according to a number of scholars. They propose that the ră- prefix in the verbs răscoc ("overbake") and răzbat ("go through") retained the Latin re- prefix. Suffixes from Slavic languages also appeared in Romanian. Among the suffixes of Slavic origin -ac, -nic and -uș are still especially popular.

== Phonology ==
Loanwords from other languages were rarely subject to fundamental phonological changes, most likely due to their steady influx contributing to the "relatively large phonological inventory" (Kim Schulte) of Romanian. Slavic languages had more than 30 two- or three-member consonant clusters. These clusters were alien to Common Romanian, but many of them appeared in Romanian through borrowing of Slavic terms. Early Slavic loanwords contain two-member consonant sequences. Most Slavic consonant clusters with a first fricative were fully adopted: vlădică ("bishop" from vladika), slugă ("servant" from sluga), zmeu ("dragon" from zmey). The cluster "șt" can be detected in both Slavic loanwords and terms inherited from Latin. The phonetical changes which resulted in this consonant sequence may have started before the first contacts with the Slavic peoples, but early contacts with South Slavic peoples clearly influenced its present form. The word-initial "zdr"-cluster appears both in Slavic loanwords, like zdravăn ("strong") and a zdrobi ("to crush"), and in words of unknown origin, like a zdruncina ("to shake") and a zdrăngăni ("to tinkle").

Slavic loanwords spread the consonant "h" in Common Romanian

Romanian /ɨ/

Most linguists attribute the pre-ioticization of some Romanian words—the appearance of the semi-vowel "j" before a world-initial "e"—to contacts with speakers of Proto-Slavic. Pre-ioticization can only be detected in eight forms of the verb a fi ("to be") and in four personal pronouns, but three archaic demonstratives also displayed this phonetic change. Linguist Grigore Nandriș argues that pre-ioticization can hardly be attributed to Slavic influence, because the Latin e vowel had transformed into a diphthong long before the first Slavic loanwords appeared in Common Romanian. Palatalization of consonants before the vowel "i" is also attributed to Slavic influence by a number of scholars, but others maintain that it developed internally. The palatalization of the last consonant of masculine nouns and of verbs before "i" ending is a prominent example of this development: for instance, the last consonant of the Romanian word for coin (ban) changes from "n" to "ɲ" in plural (bani).

The majority of specialists agree that the consonant "h" was alien to Common Romanian, but Slavicisms — such as duh ("spirit") from *duxŭ, and hrean ("horseradish") from *xrĕnŭ—enabled its appearance in Romanian. In contrast to this view, Nandriș writes that certain Arumanian and dialectical Daco-Romanian terms show that the consonant "f" developed into "h" before the disintegration of Common Romanian (for instance, the Aromanian and dialectical Daco-Romanian word for iron, h'er descends from ferrum). Linguist Graham Mallinson emphasizes that the consonant occurs in Romanian in positions alien to Latin. Linguist Peter R. Petrucci proposes that Romanian loanwords containing "f" in place of the Proto-Slavic "x" were modelled on Macedonian patterns, because Proto-Slavic "x" developed into "v" in Macedonian in word-final position and after "u". According to Mallinson, "x" changed to "v" at a relatively late period of the development of Daco-Romanian, because Istro-Romanian retained the original "x" consonant. Petrucci proposes that the change of word-initial "v" to "h" in the Moldovan dialect of Daco-Romanian is to be attributed to Ukrainian influence either through language shift from Ukrainian or through the bilingualism of masses of Moldovans.

One of the most interesting components of the Romanian phonological inventory is the vowel /ɨ/, which is the most recent addition to its inventory. Most linguists support that /ɨ/ first arose as an allophone of /ə/ in Romanian native vocabulary and not due Slavic influence as Petrucci argues that /ɨ/ cannot have come from Slavic *y as there is a lack of direct correspondence between Slavic loanwords and /ɨ/. Petrucci emphasizes that three of the earliest Slavic loanwords which now contain "î" could have originally contained /i/ in Romanian, because the vowel shift from /i/ to /ɨ/ is attested in similar position in some inherited words.

== Morphology ==
Romanian is the sole major Romance language still using the vocative case when addressing a person: domnule ("sir!"), Radule ("Radu!"), soro ("sister!"), Ano ("Anne!"). Unlike Latin, which used a distinct vocative ending only in the singular of most nouns in only one of its five declensions, Romanian has three distinct vocative forms. The -e ending of masculine nouns in vocative corresponds to the specific Latin vocative suffix (if one ignores the -ul- article infix, obligatory in Romanian vocative), but neither the -o ending of feminine nouns, nor the -lor ending of plural can be detected in Latin. Since the vocative also exists in Slavic languages, linguists agree that contacts with Slavic-speaking groups enabled its preservation in Romanian, with some even suggesting that the vocative case (re-)appeared in Romanian as a consequence of a language shift from Slavic. Even if Common Romanian retained at least the traces of the vocative case, the vocative suffix of feminine nouns can most probably be attributed to the parlance of an originally Slavic-speaking group.

The appearance of two forms of the infinitive, a short and a long form, is one of the distinctive features of Daco-Romanian and Istro-Romanian in comparison with other Romance languages. The shortening of the infinitive can be observed in the development of Tuscan, but also Bulgarian and Macedonian: for example, Old Church Slavonic viděti ("to see") shortened into vidět in Middle Bulgarian which became vidě in Bulgarian. Linguists Jacques Byck and Ion Diaconescu maintain that the infinitive shortened without external influence during the development of Romanian. Alexandru Graur, Ivan Gălăbov and Alexandru Rosetti argue that South Slavic influence gave rise to this specific morphological change. Petrucci offers an interim explanation, saying that the infinitive was shortened at an early stage of the development of Romanian, but a language shift from South Slavic is responsible for the development of the two forms of infinitive.

Romanian has a neuter (or ambigeneric) gender, with neuter singular adjectives and articles corresponding to their masculine forms, and with neuter plural adjectives and articles matching their feminine variants. Since other Romance languages have not preserved the Latin neuter gender in nominal stems, Rosetti, Graur, Nandriș, Mallinson and other linguists propose that the existence of the neuter in Romanian should most probably be attributed to Slavic influence. In contrast with them, Petrucci maintains that the Romanian tripartite gender system cannot be assigned to contact with the tripartite gender system of South Slavic because of the lack of credible evidence. Petrucci and other linguists studying the grammatical gender in Romanian in recent years generally agree that it is the result of an internal historical development.

A couple of words inherited from Latin used in active voice in other Romance languages became reflexive in Romanian under a Slavic influence. For example, bojati sę became a se teme ("to fear") and roditi sę became a se naște ("to be born").

== Sources ==
- Andreose, Alvise; Renzi, Lorenzo (2013). "Geography and distribution of the Romance languages in Europe". In Maiden, Martin; Smith, John Charles; Ledgeway, Adam (eds.). The Cambridge History of the Romance Languages, Volume II: Contexts. Cambridge University Press. pp. 283–334. ISBN 978-0-521-80073-0.
- Carlton, Terence R. (1991). Introduction to the Phonological History of the Slavic Languages. Slavica Publishers. ISBN 0-89357-223-3.
- Coteanu, Ion (1981). Structura și evoluția limbii române (de la origini pînă la 1860). Editura Academiei Republicii Socialiste România.
- Dindelegan, Gabriela Pană (2013). "Introduction: Romanian - a brief presentation". In Dindelegan, Gabriela Pană (ed.). The Grammar of Romanian. Oxford University Press. pp. 1–7. ISBN 978-0-19-964492-6.
- Hall, Robert A. (1974). External History of the Romance Languages. Elsevier. ISBN 0-444-00136-0.
- Maiden, Martin (2016). "Romanian, Istro–Romanian, Megleno–Romanian, and Arumanian". In Ledgeway, Adam; Maiden, Martin (eds.). The Oxford Guide to the Romance Languages. Oxford University Press. pp. 91–125. ISBN 978-0-19-967710-8.
- Mallinson, Graham (1988). "Rumanian". In Harris, Martin; Vincent, Nigel (eds.). The Romance Languages. Oxford University Press. pp. 391–419. ISBN 978-0-19-520829-0.
- Millar, Robert McColl; Trask, Larry (2015). Trask's Historical Linguistics. Routledge. ISBN 978-0-415-70657-5.
- Nandriș, Grigore (December 1951). "The development and structure of Rumanian". The Slavonic and East European Review. 30 (74): 7–33.
- Petrucci, Peter R. (1999). Slavic Features in the History of Rumanian. Lincom Europa. ISBN 38-9586-599-0.
- Posner, Rebecca (1996). The Romance Languages. Cambridge University Press. ISBN 978-0-52-128139-3.
- Renwick, Margaret E. L. (2011). "Article 22". Phoneme Type Frequency in Romanian. Vol. 17. Archived from the original on August 4, 2019.
- Rosetti, Alexandru (1986). Istoria limbii române I: de la origini pînă la începtul secolului al XVII-lea. Editura Ştinţifică şi Enciclopedică.
- Sala, Marius (2005). From Latin to Romanian: The Historical Development of Romanian in a Comparative Romance Context. University, Mississippi. ISBN 1-889441-12-0.
- Schramm, Gottfried (1997). Ein Damm bricht. Die römische Donaugrenze und die Invasionen des 5-7. Jahrhunderts in Lichte der Namen und Wörter [=A Dam Breaks: The Roman Danube frontier and the Invasions of the 5th-7th Centuries in the Light of Names and Words] (in German). R. Oldenbourg Verlag. ISBN 978-3-486-56262-0.
- Schulte, Kim (2009). "Loanwords in Romanian". In Haspelmath, Martin; Tadmor, Uri (eds.). Loanwords in the World's Languages: A Comparative Handbook. De Gruyter Mouton. pp. 230–259. ISBN 978-3-11-021843-5.
- Sussex, Roland; Cubberley, Paul (2006). The Slavic Languages. Cambridge University Press. ISBN 978-0-521-29448-5.
- Vasiliu, Emanuel (1968). Fonologia istorică a dialectelor dacoromâne. Editura Academiei Republicii Socialiste România.
