= Posen Township =

Posen Township may refer to the following placed in the United States:

- Posen Township, Michigan
- Posen Township, Yellow Medicine County, Minnesota

See also

- Posen (disambiguation)
