= Michael Posner =

Michael Posner may refer to:

- Michael Posner (economist) (1931–2006), British economist and academic
- Michael Posner (journalist) (born 1947), Canadian journalist and biographer
- Michael Posner (lawyer) (born 1950), American lawyer, human rights activist, federal official
- Michael Posner (psychologist) (born 1936), American psychologist
- Mike Posner (born 1988), American musician

== See also ==
- Posner (disambiguation)
