= Posen =

Posen may refer to:

== Places ==
=== Europe ===
- Poznań (German: Posen), city in Poland
- Grand Duchy of Posen, autonomous province of Prussia, 1815–1848
- Province of Posen, Prussian province, 1848–1918
- Posen (region), the south-western part of the province of Posen
- Posen-West Prussia, German province, 1922–1938
- Reichsgau Posen, occupied in 1939, annexed and directly incorporated into the German Reich

=== United States ===
- Posen, Illinois, a village
- Posen, Washington County, Illinois, an unincorporated community
- Posen, Michigan
- Posen Township, Michigan
- Posen Township, Minnesota

== Other uses ==
- Posen (surname)
- SMS Posen, a German dreadnaught, 1908–1922

== See also ==
- Posner (disambiguation)
- Pozen (disambiguation)
- Poznań (disambiguation)
