= Former Jewish School (Leer) =

Coordinates: 53.232003°N 7.449295°E

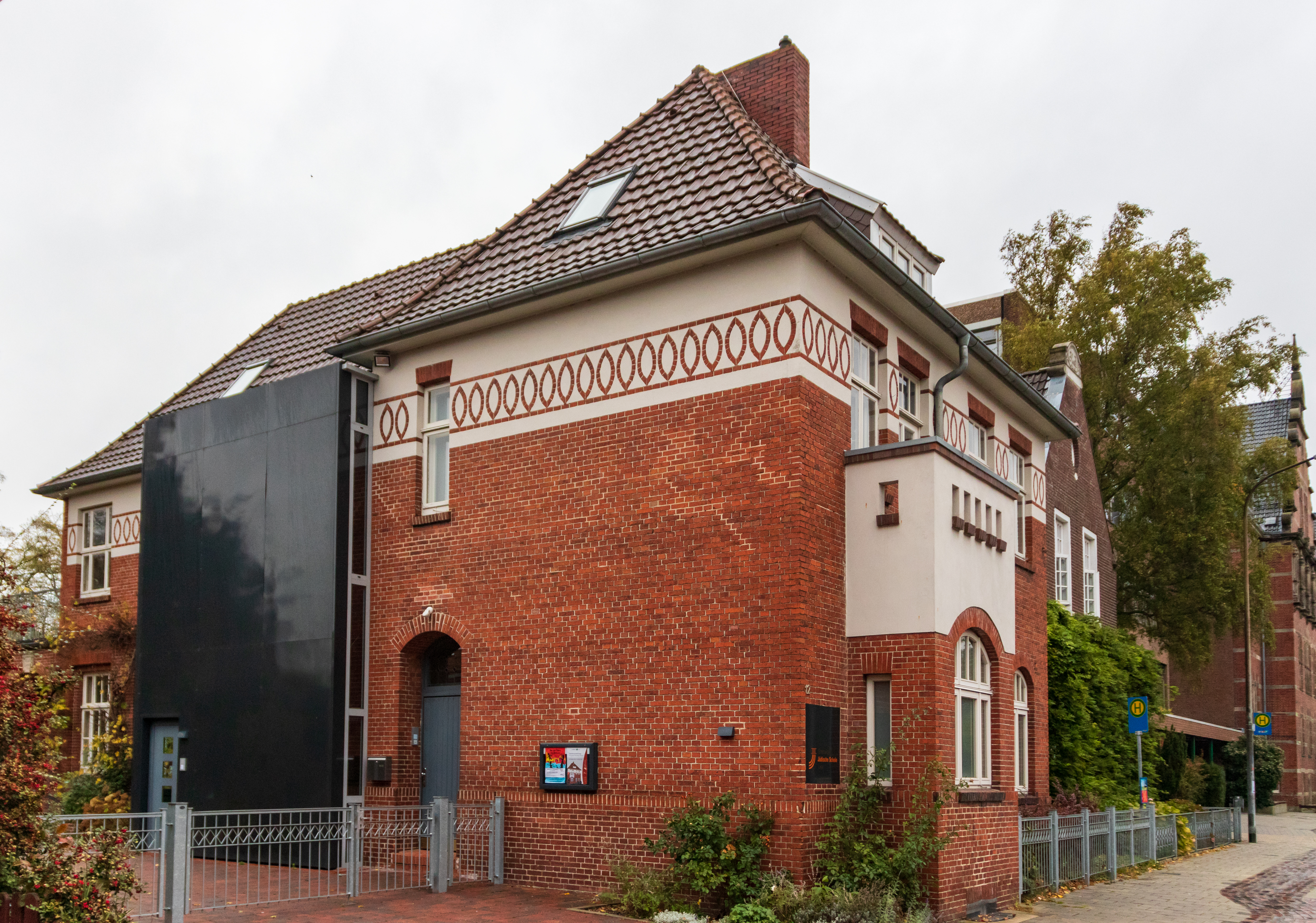
The Former Jewish School Leer

The Former Jewish School in Leer is a cultural and memorial site in the county seat of Leer in East Frisia. The institution, run by the district of Leer, describes itself as a "place of remembrance and commemoration, for exhibitions and cultural events on Jewish life then and now." It is housed in the school building used from 1909 to 1939 by the former Jewish community of Leer. The community was destroyed during the Nazi era.

== Concept ==
Through exhibitions and cultural events, the district of Leer aims to create access to the history of the building and to Jewish culture. The building offers six rooms for this purpose, including the classroom on the ground floor. The upper floor, accessible barrier-free by elevator, contains exhibition rooms as well as a seminar room. The permanent exhibition addresses the history of the building and of the people who lived, learned, and taught there. Among other things, visitors can view three filmed interviews with former pupils. They recount the period of the school's operation and closure, and their personal suffering during the Shoah. The exhibition concept was developed by the firm Gössel und Partner.

The classroom is once again recognizable as such. On the upper floor of the building, during renovation work in the living room of the teacher's apartment (the room in which religious services were held after the November Pogroms) a stencilled wall painting with a synagogue motif was uncovered. It documents the close connection between the school and the synagogue. Special exhibitions, readings, theatrical performances, and Hebrew courses round out the program.

== Organization ==
The owner and operator of the Former Jewish School Leer is the district of Leer. Susanne Bracht has been the academic director since 1 June 2014. She was selected from a nationwide pool of 108 applicants.

== History of the Jewish school ==
In 1793 the Jewish community of Leer built its first synagogue. In 1803, on the recommendation of the Kriegs- und Domänenkammer in Aurich, it opened a Jewish elementary school in Leer. The wealthy Katz family supported the community with a large monetary donation toward the construction of both buildings.

In its opening year the school was attended by 17 children, taught by a teacher from Posen, who left after only one year. Thereafter the teaching staff changed frequently. Nevertheless, attendance at the school was compulsory for children of community members. Before the middle of the 19th century the school moved into a building on Kirchstraße, but subsequently faced serious financial difficulties that made it hard to pay the teacher's salary. This led to the school's temporary closure in 1859. Afterward the institution's financial situation gradually improved, and student numbers rose to 38 by 1883.

In October 1909 the community acquired a plot of land on Deichstraße (today Ubbo-Emmius-Straße 12) and built a new school building there with a teacher's apartment. Construction was carried out by the local firm Thien. The school was completed in 1910. At that time about 250 Jewish men, women, and children lived in Leer and the surrounding area. The school was attended by around 25 children. During the First World War, the Jewish teacher Lasser Abt took over teaching at the state elementary school in Leer due to a teacher shortage, and the Jewish school in Leer remained closed during those years. During the Weimar Republic student numbers continued to decline: 18 children in 1924 and 16 in 1926 attended the elementary school. In addition, Jewish pupils at the town's other schools received religious instruction in the building.

During the Nazi era, Jewish pupils at the municipal schools increasingly suffered discrimination from their classmates. To secure the survival of their elementary school, the pupils' parents began paying a fixed weekly contribution from September 1933. The school's enrollment grew sharply after 1933, as Jewish pupils were gradually forced to leave the municipal schools. In 1935 the community celebrated the 50th anniversary of the synagogue's dedication as well as the 25th anniversary of the school's opening with a three-day festival, during which large monetary donations were made to the teacher for expanding the school library. In 1937, 37 children still attended the Jewish school. It continued to be used until 1939, after Kristallnacht on 9 November 1938. After the destruction of the synagogue, the community moved its religious services into the schoolrooms. After the Nazis forced the closure of the school, the community was compelled to sell the building to the city of Leer in the summer of 1939. The remaining pupils were taught until spring 1940 in the house of innkeeper David Hirschberg on Kampstraße, until the Nazis officially closed the school on 23 February 1940.

An initiative by East Frisian district administrators and the city council of Emden led, at the end of January 1940, to an order from the Gestapo field office in Wilhelmshaven that Jews were to leave East Frisia by 1 April 1940. East Frisian Jews were forced to find other housing within the German Reich (excluding Hamburg and the areas west of the Rhine). The Hirschberg family was the last Jewish family to leave Leer. Their house at Groninger Straße/corner of Kampstraße was used in 1940 as a ghetto for the remaining Jews of the district. From here the Jewish population still remaining in Leer was deported to the extermination camps. After that, Leer was officially declared judenfrei.

In the postwar period the building changed owners frequently. The ground floor housed a veterinary practice for more than 20 years, into the 21st century, while the converted attic held an apartment. In 2011 the district purchased the building "in order to restore it according to the original plans."

The building was in such good condition that its original state could largely be restored. Only the glazed post-and-beam structure of the stairwell extension, built after the war, was reclad and "symbolically reshaped with a grid pattern of matte dots on a glossy metal panel facade." Since then the stairwell has been integrated into the building as an exhibition area and space. The old plank floors on the upper level and the solid-wood doors were preserved, as were the stained-glass windows on the west side, though new windows were installed in front of them. The garden, too, was restored. The building has since been placed under historic preservation. The Former Jewish School in Leer opened as a cultural and memorial site on 1 September 2013. Its first academic director was Anna Flume, who was succeeded by Susanne Koppatz.

== Teachers of the Jewish school on Deichstraße ==
- Lasser Abt (1909–1922, teacher in Leer already from 1905), died in Leer
- Ignatz Popper (1922–1935), disappeared in the Riga Ghetto
- Hermann Spier (1935–1938), murdered at Treblinka
- Seligmann Hirschberg (1938–1939), murdered at Auschwitz
