= Register (sociolinguistics) =

Form of language used for a particular purpose or in a particular communicative situation

In sociolinguistics, a register is a variety of language used for a particular purpose or particular communicative situation. For example, when speaking officially or in a public setting, an English speaker may be more likely to follow prescriptive norms for formal usage than in a casual setting, for example, by pronouncing words ending in -ing with a velar nasal instead of an alveolar nasal (e.g., walking rather than walkin), choosing words that are considered more formal, such as father vs. dad or child vs. kid, and avoiding nonstandard or slang words, such as hella, ain't, and y'all.

As with other types of language variation, there tends to be a spectrum of registers rather than a discrete set of obviously distinct varieties—numerous registers can be identified, with no clear boundaries between them. Discourse categorization is a complex problem, and even according to the general definition of language variation defined by use rather than user, there are cases where other kinds of language variation, such as regional or age dialect, overlap. Due to this complexity, scholarly consensus has not been reached for the definitions of terms such as register, field, or tenor; different scholars' definitions of these terms often contradict each other.

Additional terms such as diatype, genre, text types, style, acrolect, mesolect, basilect, sociolect, and ethnolect, among many others, may be used to cover the same or similar ground. Some prefer to restrict the domain of the term register to a specific vocabulary which one might commonly call slang, jargon, argot, or cant, while others argue against the use of the term altogether. Crystal and Davy, for instance, have critiqued the way the term has been used "in an almost indiscriminate manner". These various approaches to the concept of register fall within the scope of disciplines such as sociolinguistics (as noted above), stylistics, pragmatics, and systemic functional grammar.

== History and use ==
The term register was first used by the linguist T. B. W. Reid in 1956, and brought into general currency in the 1960s by a group of linguists who wanted to distinguish among variations in language according to the user (defined by variables such as social background, geography, sex and age), and variations according to use, "in the sense that each speaker has a range of varieties and choices between them at different times." The focus is on the way language is used in particular situations, such as legalese or motherese, the language of a biology research lab, of a news report, or of the bedroom.

M. A. K. Halliday and R. Hasan interpret register as "the linguistic features which are typically associated with a configuration of situational features—with particular values of the field, mode and tenor." Field for them is "the total event, in which the text is functioning, together with the purposive activity of the speaker or writer; includes subject-matter as one of the elements." Mode is "the function of the text in the event, including both the channel taken by language – spoken or written, extempore or prepared – and its genre, rhetorical mode, as narrative, didactic, persuasive, 'phatic communion', etc." Tenor refers to "the type of role interaction, the set of relevant social relations, permanent and temporary, among the participants involved". These three values – field, mode and tenor – are thus the determining factors for the linguistic features of the text. "The register is the set of meanings, the configuration of semantic patterns, that are typically drawn upon under the specified conditions, along with the words and structures that are used in the realization of these meanings." Register, in the view of M. A. K. Halliday and R. Hasan, is one of the two defining concepts of text. "A text is a passage of discourse which is coherent in these two regards: it is coherent with respect to the context of situation, and therefore consistent in register; and it is coherent with respect to itself, and therefore cohesive."

== Register as formality scale ==
One of the most analyzed areas where the use of language is determined by the situation is the formality scale. The term register is often, in language teaching especially, shorthand for formal/informal style, although this is an aging definition. Linguistics textbooks may use the term tenor instead, but increasingly prefer the term style—"we characterise styles as varieties of language viewed from the point of view of formality"—while defining registers more narrowly as specialist language use related to a particular activity, such as academic jargon. There is very little agreement as to how the spectrum of formality should be divided.

In one prominent model, Martin Joos describes five styles in spoken English:

- Frozen: Also referred to as static register. Printed unchanging language, such as biblical quotations; often contains archaisms. Examples are the Pledge of Allegiance of the United States of America and other "static" vocalizations. The wording is exactly the same every time it is spoken.
- Formal: One-way participation; no interruption; technical vocabulary or exact definitions are important; includes presentations or introductions between strangers.
- Consultative: Two-way participation; background information is provided – prior knowledge is not assumed. "Back-channel behavior" such as "uh huh", "I see", etc. is common. Interruptions are allowed. For example teacher/student, doctor/patient, or expert/apprentice.
- Casual: In-group friends and acquaintances; no background information provided; ellipsis and slang common; interruptions common. This is common among friends in a social setting.
- Intimate: Non-public; intonation more important than wording or grammar; private vocabulary. Also includes non-verbal messages. This is most common among family members and close friends.

== ISO standard ==
The International Organization for Standardization (ISO) has defined the international standard ISO 12620, Management of terminology resources – Data category specifications. This is a registry for registering linguistic terms used in various fields of translation, computational linguistics and natural language processing and defining mappings both between different terms and between different systems in which the same terms are used. The registers identified are:

- bench-level register
- dialect register
- facetious register
- formal register
- in-house register
- ironic register
- neutral register
- slang register
- taboo register
- technical register
- vulgar register

== Diatype ==
The term diatype is sometimes used to describe language variation which is determined by its social purpose. In this formulation, language variation can be divided into two categories: dialect, for variation according to user, and diatype for variation according to use (e.g. the specialised language of an academic journal). This definition of diatype is very similar to those of register. The distinction between dialect and diatype is not always clear; in some cases a language variety may be understood as both a dialect and a diatype. Diatype is usually analysed in terms of field, the subject matter or setting; tenor, the participants and their relationships; and mode, the channel of communication, such as spoken, written or signed.

== See also ==
- Child-directed speech
- Code-switching
- Colloquialism
- Diglossia
- Elderspeak
- Etiquette
- Honorifics (linguistics) – Politeness markers
- Honorific speech in Japanese
- Korean speech levels
- Literary language
- Prestige (sociolinguistics)
- Tone (literature)
- Vernacular
