= Poznań Voivodeship =

Coordinates: 52°24′31″N 16°55′22″E

Poznań Voivodeship was the name of several former administrative regions (województwo, rendered as voivodeship and usually translated as "province") in Poland, centered on the city of Poznań, although the exact boundaries changed over the years. Poznań Voivodeship was incorporated into the Greater Poland Voivodeship after the Polish local government reforms of 1998.

== 14th century to 1793 ==
Poznań Voivodeship during the 14th to 18th centuries.

Poznań Voivodeship (Latin: Palatinatus Posnaniensis) was established in 1320 and was part of the Greater Poland Voivodeship, until it was annexed by Prussia in 1793. It was in the rule of the Garczynski family for much of the 17th and 18th century. A notable voïvodie includes Stefan Garczyński (1690–1756), author, who was opposed to serfdom, amongst other social norms of the time.

== 1793 to 1921 ==
Between 1793 and 1921, the territory formerly contained in Poznań Voivodeship was part of the following territories: South Prussia, the Poznań Department of the Duchy of Warsaw, the Grand Duchy of Posen, and the Province of Posen in Prussia.

== 1921 to 1939 ==
Map in 1938.

After World War I, Poznań Voivodeship was created from the Prussian-German province of Poznań. The borders were changed in 1939: Bydgoszcz passed to the Pomeranian Voivodeship, but some Eastern areas were included. After the changes, the area was 28,089 km^{2} with a population of 2,339,600 people (see: Territorial changes of Polish Voivodeships on April 1, 1938).

- Regional capital: Poznań.
- Principal cities: Bydgoszcz, Gniezno, Inowrocław, Jarocin, Krotoszyn, Leszno, Miedzychód, Ostrów Wielkopolski, Rawicz.

== 1939 to 1945 ==
During World War II, Poland was occupied by Nazi and Soviet forces and the territory annexed by Germany was named the Reichsgau Wartheland, which partially overlapped with the former Province of Posen and also had Poznań/Posen as its capital.

== 1945 to 1975 ==
After 1945, the administrative unit centered on Poznań was again known as Poznań Voivodeship. It was superseded by a redrawn Poznań Voivodeship and Kalisz, Konin, Piła and Leszno Voivodeships.

== 1975 to 1998 ==
Map of 1975.

The Poznań Voivodeship (Polish: województwo poznańskie) as redrawn in 1975 was again superseded by the Greater Poland Voivodeship, which was formed by the merger of five former Voivodeships.

Capital city: Poznań.

Major cities and towns (with populations in 1995):

- Poznań (581,800);
- Gniezno (71,000);
- Śrem (29,800);
- Września (28,600);
- Swarzędz (26,100);
- Środa Wielkopolska (21,400);
- Luboń (20,700);

== See also ==
- Voivodeships of Poland
- Poznań (city)
  - History of Poznań
- Poznań (disambiguation)
- Posen
