= Conceptual space =

Concept in psychology

The 11 exhaustive topological relations between regions. In Gärdenfors' theory, these relations illustrate how spatial concepts can be represented as geometric structures within a conceptual space.

A conceptual space is a geometric structure that represents a number of quality dimensions, which denote basic features by which concepts and objects can be compared, such as weight, color, taste, temperature, pitch, and the three ordinary spatial dimensions. In a conceptual space, points denote objects, and regions denote concepts. The theory of conceptual spaces is a theory about concept learning first proposed by Peter Gärdenfors. It is motivated by notions such as conceptual similarity and prototype theory.

The theory also puts forward the notion that natural categories are convex regions in conceptual spaces. In that if $x$ and $y$ are elements of a category, and if $z$ is between $x$ and $y$, then $z$ is also likely to belong to the category. The notion of concept convexity allows the interpretation of the focal points of regions as category prototypes. In the more general formulations of the theory, concepts are defined in terms conceptual similarity to their prototypes. Conceptual spaces have found applications in both cognitive modelling and artificial intelligence.

== See also ==
- Categorical perception
- Cognitive architecture
- Color space
- Commonsense reasoning
- Conceptual dependency theory
- Distributional semantics
- Face space
- Formal concept analysis
- Frame semantics
- Global workspace theory
- Image schema
- Phonetic space
- Semantic space
- Similarity (philosophy)
- State space
- Vector space model
- Visual space
