= Baby talk =

Type of speech associated with an older person speaking to a child

Baby talk or child-directed speech (CDS) (Note: Other names include child-directed language (CDL), caregiver register/speech, infant-directed speech (IDS), nursery talk/language, or parentese. From a specific parent, it is called motherese or fatherese.) is a type of speech associated with an older person speaking to an infant, toddler or very young child. CDS is characterized by a "sing song" pattern of intonation that differentiates it from the more monotone style used with other adults, e.g., CDS has higher and wider pitch, slower speech rate and shorter utterances.

It can display vowel hyperarticulation (an increase in distance in the formant space of the peripheral vowels e.g., [i], [u], and [a]) and words tend to be shortened and simplified. There is evidence that the exaggerated pitch modifications are similar to the affectionate speech style employed when people speak to their pets (pet-directed speech). However, the hyperarticulation of vowels appears to be related to the propensity for the infant to learn language, as it is not exaggerated in speech to infants with hearing loss or to pets. Consistent with this, infants before 6 months have been shown to abstract phonological features amodally across multiple consonants, suggesting early sensitivity to the phonological structure present in infant-directed speech.

== Terminology ==
- The first documented use of the word baby-talk, according to the Oxford English Dictionary, was in 1836.
- Motherese and parentese are more precise terms than baby talk, and perhaps more amenable to computer searches, but are not the terms of choice among child development professionals. Critics of gender stereotyping also prefer parentese to the term motherese, because all caregivers use distinct speech patterns and vocabulary when talking to young children. Motherese can also refer to English spoken in a higher, gentler manner, which is otherwise correct English, as opposed to the non-standard, shortened word forms.
- Child-directed speech (CDS) is the term preferred by researchers, psychologists and child development professionals.
- Infant-directed speech (IDS) is also used. The terms are interchangeable.
- Caregiver language is sometimes used.

== Characteristics ==
CDS is a clear and simplified strategy for communicating to younger children, used by adults and by older children. The vocabulary is limited, speech is slowed with a greater number of pauses, and the sentences are short and grammatically simplified, often repeated. Although CDS features marked auditory characteristics, other factors aid in development of language. Three types of modifications occur to adult-directed speech in the production of CDS:

- linguistic modifications, particularly prosody, including the simplification of speech units as well as the emphasis on various phonemes.
- modifications to attention-gaining strategies, providing visual cues through body language, particularly movements of the face, to more effectively maintain the attention of their infants.
- modifications to the interactions between parents and infants. Parents use CDS not only to promote language development but to foster a positive relationship with their infants.

The younger the child, the more exaggerated the adult's CDS is. The attention of infants is held more readily by CDS over normal speech, as with adults. The more expressive CDS is, the more likely infants are to respond to this method of communication by adults.

A key visual aspect of CDS is the movement of the lips. One characteristic is the wider opening of the mouth present in those using CDS versus adult-directed speech, particularly in vowels. Research suggests that with the larger opening of the lips during CDS, infants are better able to grasp the message being conveyed due to the heightened visual cues.

Through this interaction, infants are able to determine who positive and encouraging caregivers will be in their development. When infants use CDS as a determinant of acceptable caregivers, their cognitive development seems to thrive because they are being encouraged by adults who are invested in the development of the given infants. Because the process is interactive, caregivers are able to make significant progress through the use of CDS.

== Purpose and implications ==
=== Use with infants ===
Studies have shown that from birth, infants prefer to listen to CDS, which is more effective than regular speech in getting and holding an infant's attention. Some researchers believe that CDS is an important part of the emotional bonding process between the parents and their child, and helps the infants learn the language. Researchers at Carnegie Mellon University and the University of Wisconsin found that using basic "baby talk" may support babies in picking up words faster. Infants pay more attention when parents use CDS, which has a slower and more repetitive tone than used in regular conversation.

Purposes and benefits of CDS include supporting the ability of infants to bond with their caregivers.

Children who receive the most acknowledgement and encouragement of what they say, are given time and attention to speak and share, and who are questioned learn faster. Infants are able to apply this to larger words and sentences as they learn to process language.

CDS aids infants in bonding to caregivers. Although infants have a range of social cues available to them regarding who will provide adequate care, CDS serves as an additional indicator as to which caregivers will provide developmental support. When adults engage in CDS with infants, they are providing positive emotion and attention, signaling to infants that they are valued.

CDS can also serve as a priming tool for infants to notice the faces of their caregivers. Infants are more sensitive to the pitch and emphasized qualities of this method. Therefore, when caregivers use CDS, they expand the possibility for their infants to observe and process facial expressions. This effect could in part be due to infants associating CDS with positive facial expressions such as smiling, being more likely to respond to CDS if they expect to receive a positive response from their caregiver.

CDS may promote processing of word forms, allowing infants to remember words when asked to recall them in the future. As words are repeated through CDS, infants begin to create mental representations of each word. As a result, infants who experience CDS are able to recall words more effectively than infants who do not.

Infants can pick up on the vocal cues of CDS and will often pattern their babbling after it.

Children of depressed mothers, who do not regularly use CDS, display delayed language development. Even when depressed mothers provide their infants with positive faces, infants do not respond to their attempts at CDS, and in turn do not benefit from this important route for language acquisition. Infants are unable to create the link between speech and visual face movements in situations such as these. When fathers who are not depressed are able to provide the stimulation of CDS, infants respond well and are able to compensate from the deficit left by their mothers. This too can inhibit language and speech development. Therefore, this deficit can be especially harmful to infants with depressed mothers and little contact with male caregivers. Socioeconomic status has been found to influence the development of vocabulary and language skills. Lower-status groups tend to be behind the development of children in higher-status families. This finding is thought to be due to the amount of time parents spend with the child and the ways they interact; mothers from higher-status groups are found to say more to their children, use more variety, and speak in longer sentences.

==== Aid to cognitive development ====
Shore and others believe that CDS contributes to mental development as it helps teach the child the basic function and structure of language. Studies have found that responding to an infant's babble with meaningless babble aids the infant's development; while the babble has no logical meaning, the verbal interaction demonstrates to the child the bidirectional nature of speech, and the importance of verbal feedback. Some experts advise that parents should not talk to young children solely in baby talk, but should integrate some normal adult speech as well. The high-pitched sound of CDS gives it special acoustic qualities which may appeal to the infant. CDS may aid a child in the acquisition and/or comprehension of language-particular rules which are otherwise unpredictable; an example is the reduction or avoidance of pronoun reversal errors. It has been also suggested that its use is crucial for children to acquire the ability to ask questions.

=== Use with non-infants ===
The use of baby talk is not limited to interactions between adults and infants, as it may be used among adults, or by people to animals. In these instances, the outward style of the language may be that of baby talk, but is not considered actual "parentese", as it serves a different linguistic function.

==== Patronizing or derogatory baby talk ====
Baby talk and imitations of it may be used by one non-infant to another as a form of verbal abuse, in which the talk is intended to infantilize the victim. This can occur during bullying, when the aggressor uses baby talk to assert that the victim is weak, cowardly, overemotional, or otherwise inferior.

==== Flirtatious baby talk ====
Baby talk may be used as a form of flirtation between sexual or romantic partners. In this instance, the baby talk may be an expression of tender intimacy, and may perhaps form part of affectionate sexual roleplaying in which one partner speaks and behaves childishly, while the other acts motherly or fatherly, responding in "parentese". One or both partners might perform the child role. Terms of endearment, such as poppet (or, tellingly, baby), may be used for the same purpose in communication between the partners.

==== Baby talk with pets ====
Many people speak to their dogs as if they were another human being. These actions are not providing communication with the dog, but social interactions for the speaker, usually in order to solve some problem. The speaking style people use when talking to dogs is very similar to CDL and has been referred to as Doggerel. People tend to use sentences of around 11 words when talking to another adult; this is reduced to four words when speaking to a dog. People employ more imperatives or commands to a dog, but ask twice as many questions of the dog as of other humans, even though they do not expect the dog to answer. Recordings show that 90% of pet-talk is spoken mostly in the present tense because people talk to dogs about what is happening now rather than the past or the future, which is twice as much as with humans. Also, people are 20 times more likely to repeat or rephrase themselves to dogs than they do to humans.

A significant difference is that CDL contains many more sentences about specific bits of information, such as "This cup is red," because they are intended to teach children about language and the environment. Pet-speech contains perhaps half the sentences of this form, as, rather than instructive, its primary purpose is as a social function for humans; whether the dog learns anything does not seem to be a major concern. However, dogs are capable of recognizing specific words and responding accordingly, which means that some information can be transmitted when a human talks to a dog.

As well as the raised vocal pitch, pet-speech strongly emphasizes intonations and emotional phrasing. There are diminutives such as walkie for walk and bathie for bath.

==== Foreigner talk ====
When addressing a listener not skilled in the speaker's language, people may simplify their spoken language in an attempt to improve understanding. Some use gestures to communicate with others, especially if hearing is limited, although this is not always understood by people, as some gestures may be difficult to interpret by some people, especially as gestures have different meanings from place to place, so they may use a baby-talk–like language to communicate, leaving out small words and possibly using demonstratives instead of pronouns, for example Do not cross the road becoming No cross road. While this kind of simplification could be helpful for, say, foreign tourists, this type of communication is perceived as rude or offensive in some societies, because it may cause the foreigner to feel infantilized. It can also be considered insulting if the foreigner is skilled in the speaker's language. While not considered to be actual parentese, it has aspects which make the two language styles similar.

== Universality and differences by region ==
Researchers Bryant and Barrett (2007) have suggested (as have others before them, e.g., Fernald, 1992) that CDL exists universally across all cultures and is a species-specific adaptation. Other researchers contend that it is not universal among the world's cultures, and argue that its role in helping children learn grammar has been overestimated, pointing out that in some societies (such as certain Samoan tribes), adults do not speak to their children at all until the children reach a certain age. Furthermore, even where baby-talk is used, it has many complicated grammatical constructions, and mispronounced or non-standard words.

Other evidence suggests that baby talk is not a universal phenomenon: for example Schieffelin & Ochs (1983) describe the Kaluli tribe of Papua New Guinea who do not typically employ CDS. Language acquisition in Kaluli children was not found to be significantly impaired.

The extent to which caregivers rely on and use CDS differs based on cultural differences. Mothers in regions that display predominately introverted cultures are less likely to display a great deal of CDS, although it is still used. Further, the personality of each child experiencing CDS from a caregiver deeply impacts the extent to which a caregiver will use this method of communication.

CDS has been seen in languages such as Japanese, Italian, Mandarin, British English, American English, French, and German. This is the basis for claims that CDS is a necessary aspect of social development for children. Although found in many cultures, CDS is far from universal in terms of style and amount of use. A factor found to influence the way adults communicate with children is the way the culture views children. For example, if they view children as helpless and unable to understand, adults tend to interact with children less than if they believe that children are capable of learning and understanding. Often, cultures lacking a form of CDS make up for it in other ways, such as involving the children more in everyday activities, though the reverse might also be a valid assessment.

== Vocabulary and structure ==
=== Vocabulary ===
With respect to English-speaking parents, it is well-established that Anglo-Saxon or Germanic words tend to predominate in informal speech registers, whereas Latinate vocabulary is usually reserved for more formal uses such as legal and scientific texts. Child-directed speech, an informal speech register, also tends to use Anglo-Saxon vocabulary. The speech of mothers to young children has a higher percentage of having native Anglo-Saxon verbs than speech addressed to adults. In particular, in parents' CDS the clausal core is built in the most part by Anglo-Saxon verbs, namely, almost all tokens of the grammatical relations subject-verb, verb-direct object and verb-indirect object that young children are presented with, are constructed with native verbs. The Anglo-Saxon verb vocabulary consists of short verbs, but its grammar is relatively complex. Syntactic patterns specific to this sub-vocabulary in present-day English include periphrastic constructions for tense, aspect, questioning and negation, and phrasal lexemes functioning as complex predicates, all of which occur also in CDS. As noted above, baby talk often involves shortening and simplifying words, with the possible addition of slurred words and nonverbal utterances, and can invoke a vocabulary of its own. Some utterances are invented by parents within a particular family unit, or are passed down from parent to parent over generations, while others are quite widely known and used within most families, such as wawa for water, num-num for a meal, ba-ba for bottle, or beddy-bye for bedtime, and are considered standard or traditional words, possibly differing in meaning from place to place.

Baby talk, language regardless, usually consists of a muddle of words, including names for family members, names for animals, eating and meals, bodily functions and genitals, sleeping, pain, possibly including important objects such as diaper, blanket, pacifier, bottle, etc., and may be sprinkled with nonverbal utterances, such as goo goo ga ga. The vocabulary of made-up words, such as those listed below, may be quite long with terms for a large number of things, rarely or possibly never using proper language, other times quite short, dominated by real words, all nouns. Most words invented by parents have meaning, although the nonverbal sounds are usually meaningless and just fit the speech together.

=== Diminutives ===
Standard adult English words can be derived into baby talk following certain rules of transformation. In English, adding a terminal /i/ sound, usually written ⟨ie⟩, ⟨y⟩, or ⟨ey⟩, is a common way of forming diminutives often used as part of baby talk. It is the most common form of wordplay in CDS. Many languages have similar mechanisms.

=== Duplications ===
Still other transformations, but not in all languages, include elongated vowels, such as kitty and kiiiitty, (emphasized /ɪ/) meaning the same thing. While this is understood by English-speaking toddlers, it is not applicable with Dutch toddlers as they learn that elongated vowels reference different words.

== See also ==
- Babbling – sounds that babies make before they learn to talk
- Crib talk – toddlers talking to themselves
- Developmental psychology
- Elderspeak – the style of speech used by younger people when talking to older people
- Mama and papa – the early sounds or words commonly used by babies
- Girneys – sounds similar to baby talk that are used by some large monkeys
- Hypocorism – such as diminutive shortening of titles, such as pet names and reductions of longer words to single syllables by adding /-i/ (⟨-y⟩ or ⟨-ie⟩) to the end
