= Carl Posner =

German urologist

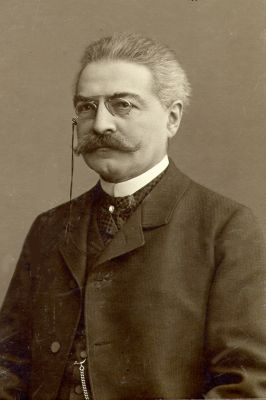
Carl Posner

Carl Posner (16 December 1854 – 20 December 1928) was a German urologist.

Posner was born in Berlin. He studied natural sciences and medicine at several German universities, receiving his PhD at Leipzig in 1875 and his medical doctorate at Giessen in 1880. Afterwards, he settled into a medical practice in Berlin, and in the meantime, received training in urology as a private assistant to Ernst Fürstenheim (1836–1904). In 1889 he obtained his habilitation, and shortly afterwards worked as a lecturer at Friedrich-Wilhelms-Universität in Berlin, where in 1903 he became an associate professor of internal medicine. He died in Berlin, aged 74.

He is remembered for his pioneer work involving testicular puncture biopsy in the investigation of infertility in humans, as well as for the eponymous "Posner test", a means used for determining the presence of albumin in urine.

== Selected works ==
In addition to his works associated with genitourinary subjects, he published a biography on pathologist Rudolf Virchow (1921) and an important study involving the lamellibranch gill, titled "Ueber den Bau der Najadenkieme. Ein Beitrag zur vergleichenden Histiologie und Morphologie der Lamellibranchiaten" (1875). His other written efforts include:

- Handbuch der speciellen medicinischen Diagnostik (with Hugo Engel, 1883); 5th edition translated into English by Jacob M DaCosta and published as "Medical diagnosis, with special reference to practical medicine : a guide to the knowledge and discrimination of diseases".
- Diagnostik der Harnkrankheiten. Zehn Vorlesungen zur Einführung in die Pathologie der Harnwege, 1894 – Diagnosis of urinary diseases, ten lectures as an introduction to the pathology of the urinary tract.
- Therapie der Harnkrankheiten; zehn Vorlesungen für Aerzte und Studirende, 1895 – Therapy for urinary diseases, ten lectures for physicians and students,
- Die Hygiene des männlichen Geschlechtslebens : 6 Vorlesungen, 1911 – The hygiene of the male sex life: six lectures.

He was an editor of the journals "Berliner klinischen Wochenschrift" and "Zeitschrift für Urologie".
