= Poznań (disambiguation) =

Poznań is a city in west-central Poland.

Poznań or Poznan may also refer to:

- Poznań, Lublin Voivodeship, a village in eastern Poland
- Poznan, another name for Pozan, an extinct breed of horse found in Poland
- ORP Poznań, a minelayer-landing ship of Polish Navy
- The Poznań, a football supporters' celebration
- Poznań Fortress, a fortress in Poznań
- "Poznan", by Low Roar from Once in a Long, Long While... (2017)

== See also ==
- Poznań County, an administrative district surrounding Poznań
- Poznań Voivodeship, a name given to various former administrative regions
- Posen (disambiguation)
