= Rebecca Posner =

British philologist, linguist and academic

- Born: Rebecca Reynolds; 17 August 1929; Shotton Colliery, County Durham, England
- Died: 19 July 2018 (aged 88)
- Spouse: Michael Posner (m. 1953; died 2006)
- Children: Two

Academic background
- Education: Somerville College, Oxford
- Doctoral advisor: Alfred Ewert

Academic work
- Discipline: Philology and linguistics
- Sub-discipline: Romance languages; West African languages; creolization
- Institutions: Girton College, Cambridge; University of Ghana; University of York; Faculty of Medieval and Modern Languages, University of Oxford; St Hugh's College, Oxford

Rebecca Posner (née Reynolds; 17 August 1929 – 19 July 2018) was a British philologist, linguist and academic, who specialized in Romance languages. Having taught at Girton College, Cambridge, the University of Ghana, and the University of York, she was Professor of the Romance Languages at the University of Oxford from 1978 to 1996.

== Early life and education ==
Posner was born on 17 August 1929 in Shotton Colliery, County Durham, England. Her father was a miner. The family moved to the Midlands in the 1930s, and she was educated at Nuneaton High School for Girls, a grammar school in Nuneaton.

In 1949, Posner won an open exhibition to study modern languages at Somerville College, Oxford. She specialised in French and comparative linguistics. She graduated with a first class honours Bachelor of Arts (BA) degree: as per tradition, her BA was promoted to a Master of Arts (MA Oxon) degree. She then undertook a postgraduate diploma in comparative philology, for which she was awarded a distinction. She continued her studies at Somerville towards a Doctor of Philosophy (DPhil) degree under the supervision of Alfred Ewert and completed her DPhil in 1958. Her thesis was titled "Consonantal dissimilation in the Romance languages".

== Academic career ==
Having completed her doctorate, Posner spent time at the Institut de Phonétique in Paris and was a post-doctoral fellow at Yale University in the United States. While in the United States, she came under the influence of Yakov Malkiel, the American-Russian etymologist. In 1960, she was elected a Fellow of Girton College, Cambridge, then an all-girls college of the University of Cambridge. In 1963, she moved to Ghana, where she had been appointed Professor of French and Head of Modern Languages at the University of Ghana. She had wanted to study West African languages for her doctorate, so this appointment allowed her study these languages, and she also to develop an interest in creolization.

In 1965, Posner returned to England and joined the University of York as a senior lecturer. She was later promoted to Reader in Language. During this time, she spent a sabbatical year in the United States as a visiting professor of romance philology at Columbia University, New York (1971–1972).

From 1978 to 1996, Posner was Professor of the Romance Languages at the University of Oxford and a Fellow of St Hugh's College, Oxford. Following her retirement she became professor emeritus of Oxford and an honorary fellow of St Hugh's College.

She served as president of the Philological Society from 1996 to 2000, and served as vice-president from 2000 until her death. She was the recipient of a festschrift volume edited by two of her former colleagues, John Green and Wendy Ayres-Bennett: Variation and Change in French: essays presented to Rebecca Posner on the occasion of her sixtieth birthday (London, Routledge, 1990).

== Personal life ==
In 1953, Rebecca, then Reynolds, married economist Michael Posner (died in 2006). Together they had two children: a son, Christopher, and a daughter, Barbara.

== Selected works ==
- Posner, Rebecca (1961). Consonantal Dissimilation in the Romance Languages. The Philological Society. OCLC 2312884.
- Posner, Rebecca (1996). The Romance Languages. Cambridge: Cambridge University Press. ISBN 978-0521236546.
- Posner, Rebecca (1997). Linguistic Change in French. Oxford: Clarendon Press. ISBN 978-0198240365.
