= Posner =

Posner or Pozner may refer to:

- Posner (surname)
- Posner Park, in Florida, US
- Posner's theorem in algebra
- Posner cueing task, a neuropsychological test

== See also ==
- Posener, a surname
