= Posener =

Posener is a surname of German origin, a demonym for a person from the Polish city Poznań (German: Posen). Notable people with the surname include:

- Alan Posener (born 1949), British-German journalist
- Edith Head born Edith Claire Posener (1897–1981), American costume designer
- Jill Posener (born 1953), British photographer and playwright
- Joachim Posener (born 1964), Swedish financier and author
- Julius Posener (1904–1996), German architectural historian
- Nicola Posener (born 1987), British actress; see Ninjak
- Paule Posener-Kriéger (1925–1996), French Egyptologist
- Zara Posener (born 1984), British actress

== See also ==
- Posner
- Posen
