= Church Slavonic in Romania =

Historic use of a Slavic language in Romania

Church Slavonic was the principal administrative and liturgical language of the medieval Romanian principalities of Wallachia and Moldavia. Its adoption reflected the strong cultural and political influence of the various Slavic states neighbouring the principalities, particularly the Second Bulgarian Empire. From the 14th to the 16th centuries, most official charters, chronicles, and religious texts were produced in Slavonic, even though the local population continued to speak Romanian in daily life. Beginning in the 16th century, Romanian gradually replaced Slavonic in official documents and eventually became the dominant language of administration and worship, although the language would continue to be written in the Cyrillic alphabet until the mid-19th century.

== Characteristics ==
The language, while based on Church Slavonic, was influenced by the Slavic languages used by surrounding peoples. The most important influences were from Bulgarian, with influences from Serbian (in Wallachia) and Russian (in Moldavia). Starting with the 15th century, the language began to be influenced by the Romanian language.

== Usage ==
After the Slavic migrations, Slavonic became the liturgical language of the Eastern Orthodox Church in present-day Romania, under the influence of the South Slavic feudal states. The exact timing of this change happened is not known, but it was probably in the 10th century. While the language was not understood by most Romanians, it was a language known by the bishops, the monks, some of the priests, the clerks, the merchants, the boyars and the Prince.

Church Slavonic was also used as a literary language, for example in chronicles, story-books, law codexes (known as pravila), property documents (hrisov), decrees of the voivodes or boyars, diplomatic correspondence and sometimes even in private letters. It also led to an integration of the written Romanian culture into the Slavic culture of the neighbours.

== Replacement with Romanian ==
The earliest contracts (zapis) to be written in Romanian rather than Slavonic date from 1575 to 1590 and by 1655–1660, all the administrative documents at the Princely Courts of both Wallachia and Moldavia were written in Romanian.

In Wallachia, the gospels were translated into the vernacular between 1512 and 1518, and by the middle of the 16th century, the earliest religious works were printed, while the first complete bible in Romanian was printed in Bucharest in 1688.

Nevertheless, the Orthodox Church opposed the changes and the Metropolitan printing presses continued to print Church Slavonic books until 1731 in Moldavia and 1745 in Wallachia.

== Legacy and assessments ==
Coresi, the printer of the first Romanian-language book, saw in 1564 no good in the usage of Church Slavonic as a liturgical language, as the priests speak to the people in a foreign language, arguing that all the other peoples have the word of God in their language, except for the Romanians. Dimitrie Cantemir (1673–1723), a Moldavian scholar who published the first novel in Romanian, saw the usage of Church Slavonic as a "barbarism", which caused a cultural regression.

However, there were some cultural accomplishments done in the Church Slavonic language, such as a number of chronicles and historiographical works in Moldavia or Neagoe Basarab's Teachings to his son Theodosie.

== See also ==
- Slavic influence on Romanian
