= Trustor affair =

Takeover of a Swedish investment company in 1997

The Trustor affair involved the takeover in the summer of 1997 of a Swedish investment company listed on the Stockholm Stock Exchange. It was initially believed that following the takeover 600 million SEK had disappeared from the company's accounts. Later, when all assets had been accounted for and the company had been liquidated, the shareholders had almost doubled the value of their shares as an indirect result of the takeover. It is one of the largest financial cases in Swedish history.

== Course of events ==
In 1997 several individuals including the British lord Jonathan Guinness, Lord Moyne, planned the take over of the Swedish investment company Trustor AB.

Team Moyne had initially identified a couple of companies which matched the criteria making them suitable for takeover, of which Trustor was one. In January 1997 Jisander contacted Erik Penser Fond Commission (EPFC). Mattsson and Jisander met with EPFC as representatives for Lord Moyne who was interested in buying a Swedish investment company. Jisander and Mattsson presented both proof that they were indeed acting on behalf of Lord Moyne and the criteria for the target company and after a series of discussions Trustor was found to be the best alternative.

The A-stocks of Trustor were owned by Per-Olov Norberg. They constituted 17% of the share capital but ranked as 52% of the voting rights. Norberg also happened to be in a need to sell. Norberg wanted to buy these companies at book value.

Lord Moyne was approached by his old friend Peter Mattsson to be part of the Trustor purchase and to be the new Chairman after the takeover. Mattsson and Lord Moyne already had a company together, Mattsson Guinness Securities Ltd, and they had both been connected to the infamous financial “Effex scandal” in Norway in 1993-94.

During the spring of 1997 negotiations took place, resulting in a deal on 20 May where Lord Moyne would buy the company from Norberg for 241 million SEK. The contract contained two important clauses. First, the contract gave Norberg the right to buy Trustor's stocks in the most valuable company Kanthal, at book value. Second, the contract also gave Moyne a few days respite for the payment, which eliminated the need for a short-term loan. At about that time Lord Moyne asked Lindsay Smallbone if he would agree to be CEO after the takeover.

On 10 June Sandvik made an offer to buy Kanthal for 827 million SEK, altering the deal with Norberg. A new deal was reached a few days later where Norberg was compensated for not being able to buy Kanthal. Trustor now had the funds needed in order to complete the plan. On 13 June an extra shareholders' meeting was held, where Lord Moyne was appointed president and Lindsay Smallbone CEO.

Team Moyne now only had a few days to sort out the payment to Norberg, so on 18 June Moyne, Smallbone, Jisander and Mattsson met with two bank officers at Barclays Bank in London. At the meeting accounts were set for Trustor as well as for Lord Moyne and Jisander and in the following days a total of 730 million SEK was transferred from Trustor's account in Swedish SEB to Trustor's new account in England. 600 million SEK of the money in Trustor's account was later transferred to Jisander's account in the same bank of which 585 million was then sent directly to Lord Moyne. On 25 June the 241 million which had been agreed upon was paid to Per-Olof Norberg.

30 June was the last day for the financial statement and mostly because of the payment to Norberg, Trustor now lacked almost 300 million SEK. Lord Moyne took a loan of 293 million SEK from Van Lanschot Bankiers, based in Luxembourg, and the money was then transferred to Trustor's account in the same bank. The following day the money was transferred back to Lord Moyne who then repaid the loan.

On 31 October an article about Trustor, written by Gunnar Lindstedt, was published in Svenska Dagbladet. In the article Lindstedt wrote about Lord Moyne, Mattsson and Smallbone following a meeting with them in London. The same day a preliminary investigation started to look into the acquisition and the group of people behind it. After a discussion with the company the Stockholm stock exchange stopped the trading in Trustor. The Swedish Economic Crime Authority made an investigation into all transactions to see how much and where to the money had gone. They later concluded that 478 million had disappeared from Trustor. Smallbone arranged for the Luxembourg loan to be frozen and this together with the realisation of undervalued assets meant the value of company increased.

=== Aftermath ===
The legal aftermath had started and on December 23 Stockholm District Court decided that a compulsory liquidation should be carried through. Because of Smallbone and Moyne this was a long process since they wanted a share of the salvage value. However the stocks Moyne bought were distributed among the shareholders. Trustor's assets were sold and in the end of the year there was 1.5 billion SEK to be distributed among the minority shareholders. When trade in the stock was resumed the stock price rose to 58,50 from 32 SEK before the take over. Because of the take over the under valuated assets could finally be realized and were sold at market price and their real value recovered by Trustor AB.

Joachim Posener refused to return to Sweden to be questioned and was sought by Interpol but was never apprehended. Lord Moyne was declared bankrupt and later prosecuted along with Jisander and Mattsson. Moyne was acquitted due to lack of evidence and after appeal so were also Jisander and Mattsson. However Jisander was later prosecuted and convicted in 2009 for embezzlement related to Trustor. He is the only one to be convicted of a crime in connection with the Trustor Affair. There are no longer any open police investigations concerning the Trustor Affair as the statutes of limitations are in effect since June 2007. Smallbone was never prosecuted but was sued in a civil lawsuit by Trustor but this was later abandoned. Separate lawsuits were issued against Jisander, Moyne and Posener. Trustor also started a court case in 1999 against Barclay's Bank for their part in the irregularities.
