= Face space =

Theory of facial recognition

Face space is a theoretical idea in psychology such that it is a multidimensional space in which recognizable faces are stored. The representation of faces within this space are according to invariant features of the face itself. However, recently it was theoretically demonstrated that faces can be stored in the face space according to their dynamic features as well, and that in this case the resulting space exhibits a twofold structure.

The face space framework has been highly influential in recent face processing theory; cited in almost 1000 scientific articles and recently revisited in a special edition of the journal Quarterly Journal of Experimental Psychology featuring the top 10 ideas that have appeared in the journal's pages.

Face space is useful for accounting various aspects of face recognition including, the own-race bias, distinctiveness and caricature effects. The framework has also provided useful applications in the design of forensic techniques for eyewitness identification, such as facial composites and police lineups.

== Characteristics ==
The face-space framework is a psychological model that explains how (adult) humans process and store facial information, which we use for facial recognition. It is multidimensional, with each dimension categorised by certain facial features, some of which may be: face shape, hair colour and length, distance between the eyes, age and masculinity. However, these are not categorically identified, and face-space dimensions could theoretically include any distinguishing facial feature. The model assumes that every face is mentally represented as a specific location within this psychological space (according to its dimensions) and that the faces’ likeness correspond with the distance between them; similar faces being nearer to each other, and different faces further.

Mathematical assumptions are also necessary to explain the features of face-space. The central point of face-space (i.e. the origin) represents the central tendency of all the dimensions of facial features, with stored faces assumed to have a normal distribution in each of these dimensions. As such, faces are arranged most densely, and look the most typical at the origin, and become sparser and more distinctive with greater distance from the origin.

Storing a face in a specific location within face-space involves the encoding of facial data into the dimensions of the framework. However, encoding is never perfect; any factor that hinders face recognition can induce encoding error. Factors like negative colours, minimal viewing time and inversion (seen upside-down) when viewing a face can substantially increase its encoding error. Whilst other factors like race, distinctiveness and caricature effects can circumstantially make encoding easier or more difficult.

=== Norm and exemplar models ===
Two slightly different models of face-space are standard: norm and exemplar-based face-spaces. Both models encode faces in a multidimensional psychological space and account for factors like race and inversion. However, they differ in terms of their explanation of a face’s location in the space; either as a vector from a ‘norm face’, or as distance from other faces.

In the norm-based model, the encoding of faces is relative to a central face at the origin: a ‘norm face’. Faces are arranged using vectors from this norm, with the vector’s parameters of length and direction determined by the distinctiveness and features of the face respectively.

In the exemplar-based model, faces are encoded as individual points in the space, rather than as vectors relative to a norm face. Similarity to other faces in this model is defined by the relative distance between the faces.

== Facial recognition explanations ==
=== Distinctiveness and caricature effects ===
Multiple studies have found that faces with distinctive features are recognised more easily than typical faces. The face-space framework is able to explain this finding as it assumes that faces are distributed normally across its dimensions. Therefore, numerous typical faces are found at the origin of the model, with increasingly distinctive, yet infrequent, faces found further away. Thus, since distinctive faces are located as more distant from other faces in the face-space (low exemplar density), confusion with these other faces is less likely, leading to better recognition.

A caricature effect denotes the finding that caricatured faces are more easily recognised than veridical (original) ones. Caricatures compare individual faces with an ‘average’ face (simplified version of original) and exaggerate the facial differences that are found, thus giving the original face more distinctive features. The increased distinctiveness induced by the caricature explains the caricature effect: the original face is more typical than the caricature and therefore in a more crowded area of face-space, whereas the more distinctive caricature is further away, and thus has less scope for confusion.

=== Own-race bias ===
An own-race bias is the tendency to more easily recognise faces of people of the same race as yourself, compared to those of different races. Numerous studies have provided evidence for this phenomenon, and face-space presents multiple explanations.

An interpretation of the location of faces within face-space using multidimensional scaling, reveals that other-race faces are densely packed within a more distant area of face-space, while own-race faces are more unbiasedly distributed around the origin. This is explained in terms of the difference in exemplar density (how close faces are positioned to other faces) between own and other-race faces. Because other-race faces are encoded with less emphasis on distinguishing facial features, and more on race (the opposite of own-race faces), they are grouped close together, yet are distant from the central point of face-space. Unlike distinctiveness however, distance in this case does not facilitate facial recognition, due to the higher exemplar density (many faces are close together) of other-race faces.

Norm-based face-space on the other hand explains the own-race bias as a consequence of distance from the ‘norm face’. Own-race faces are located nearer the norm, whereas other-race faces are grouped further from it, making own-race faces quicker to process and recognise.

== Forensic applications ==
The face-space framework has been very influential in the development of modern eyewitness identification techniques. In particular, for both the fourth generation of facial composite systems as well as fairer police line-ups for suspects with distinguishing features.

=== Facial composites ===
Face-space puts an emphasis on facial identification according to similarities or differences between whole faces, rather than individual facial features. Accordingly, principal component analysis is used to derive certain dimensions or ‘eigenfaces’ from sample faces, which can be combined and encoded upon to construct new, whole, faces. This can be used to create more accurate facial composite systems, as holistic face representations are better recognised than representations using individual features, such as those used by older facial composite systems.

=== Police lineup design ===
In a police lineup, choosing the sole suspect that has a distinguishing feature described by the eyewitness (such as a piercing) on the basis of that feature alone, is not fair to that potentially innocent suspect. To correct for this partiality, you can either cover up the feature on the individual, or replicate the feature on all suspects. Distinctive features replicated on multiple faces would mean they are nearer in face-space, and therefore perceived as more similar, according to the hybrid-similarity model. Consequently, this model correctly predicts replication as a more effective procedure for correct identification of target individuals than concealment, as a result of a more difficult decision induced through lesser variance within the lineup.

== See also ==
Conceptual space
