= Pozen =

Pozen may refer to:

- David E. Pozen, law professor
- Leonid Pozen (1849–1921), Russo-Ukrainian sculptor and politician
- Robert Pozen (born 1946), American financial executive
- Pozen (river), a tributary of the Suceava in Romania

== See also ==
- Posen (disambiguation)
