= T. B. W. Reid =

Irish-born British professor (1901–1981)

Thomas Bertram Wallace Reid (10 July 1901 – 30 August 1981), more commonly referred to as T. B. W. Reid, was a British Romance philologist from Armagh, Northern Ireland, who spent most of his life in England. He was a professor at the University of Manchester and was Professor of the Romance Languages at the University of Oxford between 1958 and 1968.

Reid coined the term "register" in 1956 to describe how people use language differently in different social situations.

== Life ==
Thomas Bertram Wallace Reid was born in Armagh, Northern Ireland in 1901. His parents, Thomas Ebeneezer Reid (1869–1948) and Annie M. Reid (1876–1941), were Presbyterian Christians, and his father worked for Armagh County Council.

Reid taught at the University of Manchester for much of his early career before moving to Oxford, where he was the Professor of the Romance Languages between 1958 and 1968. Reid was the president of the Anglo-Norman Text Society (ANTS), a society founded by fellow Romance philologist Mildred K. Pope to promote the study of Anglo-Norman literature. Reid's edition of The Romance of Horn was published through the society.

After retiring from academic duties in 1968, Reid remained involved with ANTS, primarily by editing texts for publication. During the 1970s, he helped to edit the Anglo-Norman Dictionary, and he completed a study of The Tristan of Béroul, which was published in 1972.

Reid died from cancer on 30 August 1981, aged 80. One obituary described Reid as "one of the outstanding philologists of [his] time".

After Reid's death, ANTS published a memorial volume in his honour.

== Selected works ==
- Reid, T. B. W. (1958). Twelve fabliaux : from MS F. Fr. 19152 of the Bibliothèque Nationale. Manchester: Manchester University Press.
- Reid, T. B. W. (1955–1964). The Romance of Horn. Oxford: Blackwell.
- Reid, T. B. W. (1972). The Tristran of Beroul: a textual commentary. Oxford: Blackwell. ISBN 9780631143505.
