= Professor of the Romance Languages =

Professorship at the University of Oxford

The Professorship of the Romance Languages is a statutory chair at the University of Oxford. The first courses in Romance languages were offered by Max Müller in the 1850s and the Selbourne Commission proposed the establishment of a Professorship of Romance or Neo-Latin Languages at Corpus Christi College in the 1870s. The college, however, was unwilling to fund it and so the university had to wait. An appeal for funds and a bequest by Cuthbert Shields allowed the Taylorian Professorship of the Romance Languages to be established in 1909. The first appointee was Hermann Oelsner, who had held the Taylorian lecturership at the university and was an expert in Old French. The "Taylorian" title was eventually dropped and the chair became associated with a fellowship at Trinity College in 1925.

== List of Professors of the Romance Languages ==
- 1909–1913: Hermann Oelsner
- 1913–1927: Paul Studer
- 1927–1930: Edwin George Ross Waters
- 1930–1958: Alfred Ewert, FBA
- 1958–1968: Thomas Bertram Wallace Reid
- 1968–1976: Stephen Ullmann
- 1976–1977: Roy Harris
- 1978–1996: Rebecca Posner
- 1996–present: Martin David Maiden, FBA
