= Phonetic space =

Range of sounds in human language

Phonetic space is the range of language sounds that can be made by an individual. There is some controversy over whether an individual's phonetic space is language dependent, or if there exists some common, innate, phonetic space across languages.

Phonetic space is a concept pioneered by Martin Joos in 1948 and developed by Gordon E. Peterson in 1951 and Noam Chomsky in 1968. Chomsky developed the idea that phonetic space is universal and every human is born with a discrete phonetic space. The most cited rebuttal of Chomsky's proposal of a universal and discrete phonetic space is an article by Port and Leary titled, "Against Formal Phonology". Applications of phonetic space include interlanguage phonetic comparison and phonological analysis.

== Definition ==
A definition of phonetic space is not agreed upon, the concept varying in use and meaning depending on the author in question. Some similarities and constants can, however, be drawn. One thing that is known, phonetic space is universal; every human that uses verbal communication obtains a discrete phonetic space. This space is the distribution of vowels perceived by the speaker. The recognition of words, and specifically the vowels within these words, is achieved by noting a perceived difference between one sound and another. The act of comparing these competing sounds and categorizing them within the mind is the creation of a phonetic space. The identity of each sound is a conglomerate of ideas and concepts composed of categories such as: VOT (Voice Onset Time), Amplitude Rise-Time, Formant Frequency, Bandwidth, Formant Transition, and Energy-Density Maximum. Not all of these categories are used for every sound, however in building an individual phonetic space, the aforementioned attributes are oftentimes integral to the differentiation process used by the mind to successfully distinguish between any two competing sounds. Based on these ideas, the Vowel Quadrilateral is used to show what the realization of these basic would look like, and helps to visually conceptualize the separation of competing phonetic space that occurs within the human mind.

=== Controversy ===
In 2005, Robert F. Port and Adam P. Leary published an argument against the existence of a fixed phonetic inventory. They presented the idea of a phonetic space as unrealistic in terms of the broadness of languages present and more specifically that languages are not consistent in distinctness, discreteness, or temporal patterns, even within the same language. They argue that in order for a formal system to exist, it must have rules, and therefore each "phonetic atom" - in this case, all the phonetic sounds in the universe - "must be static and discretely different from each other," which means there can be no inconsistency in how each sound is produced. They argue that this is unrealistic because speakers of the same language often speak differently in that the intonations of sounds and stresses on syllables depend on each person's style of speaking, not necessarily their accent.

Port and Leary claim that phonetics is filled with many asymmetries. How we understand the phonetic space to look like comes from the idea that the dimensions of the space include Voicing, Height, and Nasal, and the variations of these dimensions help produce the many sounds of language. Port and Leary argue that not all phonetic properties can be combined, however, such as vowel height and backness, and therefore, the rules are asymmetric in that it is unknown what properties can exist together in one sound.

In regards to the concept of the phonetic space, Port and Leary essentially argue that, contrary to the research of Chomsky and Halle, there are too many inconsistencies and difficulties concerned with the existence of a phonetic space and that while their perspective is not widely accepted by other linguists, they contribute valid points to the idea that the infinite number of sounds cannot co-exist perfectly with a set of rules in one space.

== History ==
Phonetic space is rarely touched upon in linguistics, and therefore little research has been done on the topic, however, there are a few things of note regarding the subject: The idea of phonetic space could not have developed until we had a working definition of phonetics and had a way to place sound in space. While Grassmann's development of linear algebra set us on the conceptual path to placing values in space, it was C. G. Kratzenstein who first published detailed methods to synthesize speech in the 1700s. "Although when his principal phonetic work, was published in 1781 and 1782 there was no clear understanding of acoustic resonance, his accomplishment – via trial and error – was remarkable and contributed to accumulating "existence proofs" that speech could be understood in physical and physiological terms."

While first mentioned in the 1700s, the idea was largely ignored until the 1940s when the term was more officially coined by Martin Joos, an American linguist and professor of German. Joos contributed much to the realm of phonetics and phonology, writing the monograph that helped linguists come to a more unified theory regarding acoustics in phonetics. The concept would later be expanded on by Gordon E. Peterson in his essay, 'The Phonetic Value of Vowels'. Along with these contributions, Marshall McLuhan could be mentioned as well, as he was the one to truly consider acoustic space, which is very similar to phonetic space. Though not exactly the same, as acoustic space refers more to the environment that allows for the sound, while phonetic space is more niche, in that it is in reference to the space between sounds. On a surface level they may not seem related, but it is worth the mention even if nothing is directly attributed to McLuhan.

=== Major contributors ===
Martin Joos was an American linguist who was most commonly known for his study on language formality. Though Joos didn't solely study phonetic space, he contributed to the field of Acoustic Phonetics through his journal entry Acoustic Phonetics and Readings in Linguistics.

Gordon E. Peterson was an American linguist whose field of study varied from acoustic analysis to phonemic theory and automatic speech recognition. Though Peterson didn't explicitly study phonetic space, in his study of phonetic value, he concluded that the vowel diagram that linguists typically use is a two-dimensional representation of the vowels in the phonetic space, which is multi-dimensional.

Noam Chomsky is a prominent American linguist who pioneered the idea of an innate universal grammar, which also ties into his idea that phonetic space is also universally innate.

== Applications ==
In 2010, a study on Phonetic Space was done to determine if phonetic spaces do exist and differ speaker to speaker. Three groups of participants were tested: those who were born and raised in China, those who moved from China at an early age and Americans who have learned Chinese later in life. Subjects were recorded saying various sounds and analyzed thorough Praat, a computer software that measures sounds into Hz. The various frequencies are grouped into Formants which correlate to certain sounds in the proposed phonetic space. The recorded values for the sounds of heritage speakers and non heritage speakers differed greatly. The averages show that the phonetic space, or values of sound, differ between the three groups.

== See also ==
- Acoustic phonetics
- Vowel
