= Peter Gärdenfors =

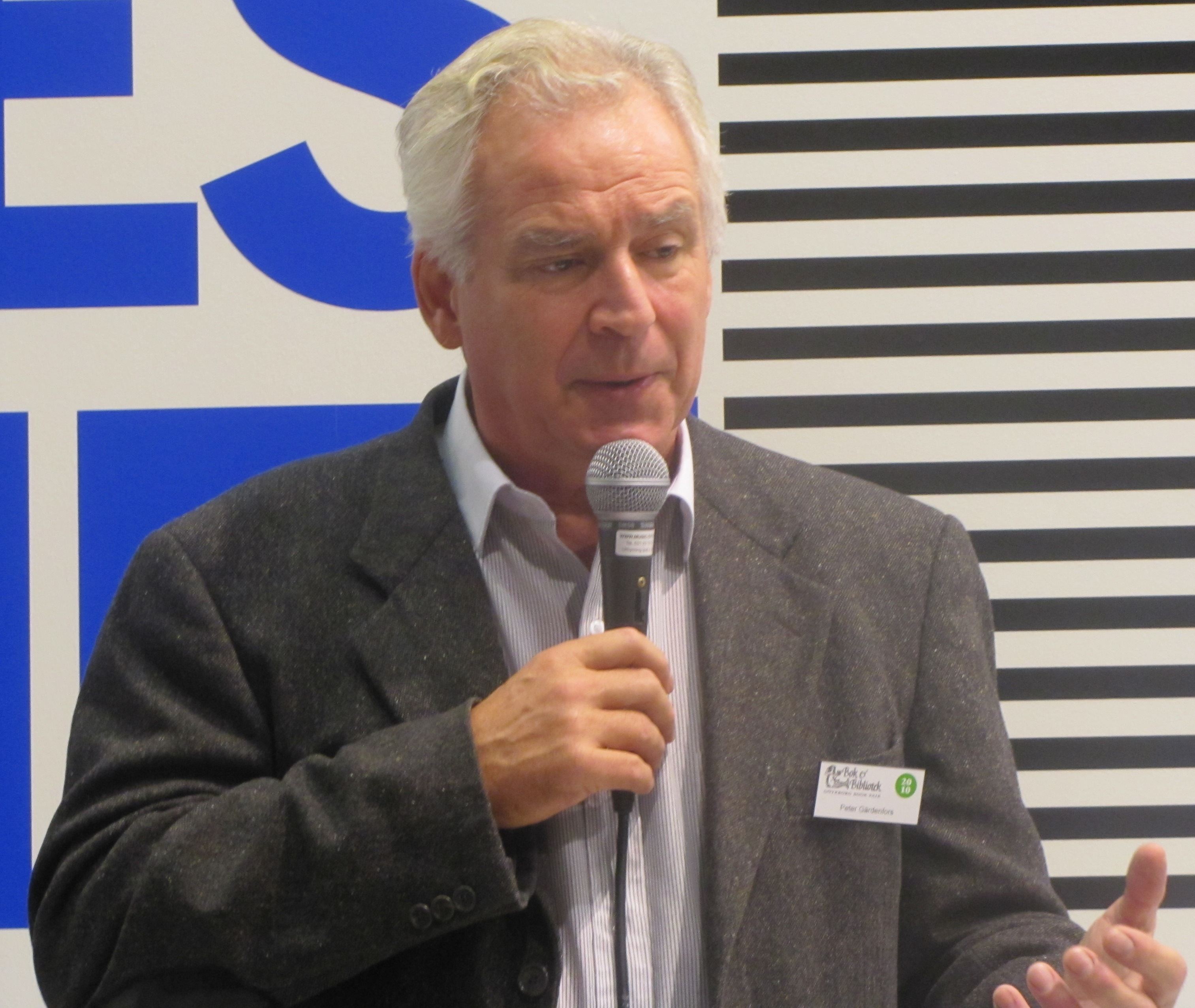
- Gärdenfors in 2010.
- Born: September 21, 1949 (age 76); Forsakar, Sweden
- Education: Lund University
- Awards: Gad Rausing Prize
- Scientific career
- Fields: Cognitive science, philosophy
- Workplaces: Lund University
- Website: www.fil.lu.se/person/PeterGardenfors

Björn Peter Gärdenfors (born 21 September 1949) is professor of cognitive science at the Lund University, Sweden.

Gärdenfors is a recipient of the Gad Rausing Prize (Swedish: Rausingpriset). He received his doctorate from Lund University in 1974. Internationally, he is one of Sweden's most notable philosophers. In 1996, he was elected a member of the Royal Swedish Academy of Letters, History and Antiquities and in 2009 he became a member of Royal Swedish Academy of Sciences. He is member of Deutsche Akademie für Naturforscher and of Academia Europaea. Gärdenfors has twice (in 2003–04 and in the Fall of 2012) been a Fellow at the Swedish Collegium for Advanced Study in Uppsala, Sweden. In 2014 he was awarded a Senior Fellowship of the Zukunftskolleg at the University of Konstanz. He was a member of the Prize Committee for the Prize in Economic Sciences in Memory of Alfred Nobel 2011-2017.

Gärdenfors was the first to apply a game theoretical approach to rights in his paper "Rights, Games and Social Choice".

Peter Gärdenfors' research covers several areas: Belief revision, decision theory, philosophy of science, concept formation, conceptual spaces, cognitive semantics, and the evolution of cognition and language.

His son Simon Gärdenfors is a famous cartoonist, comedian and rapper.

== Writings ==
- The Geometry of Meaning: Semantics Based on Conceptual Spaces. Cambridge, Massachusetts: MIT Press. 2014. ISBN 978-0-262-02678-9.
- Conceptual Spaces: The Geometry of Thought. Cambridge, Massachusetts: MIT Press. 2000. ISBN 0-262-07199-1.
- How Homo Became Sapiens. Oxford; New York: Oxford University Press. 2003. ISBN 0-19-852850-7.
- The Dynamics of Thought. Dordrecht: Springer. 2005. ISBN 1-4020-3399-0.
- Den meningssökande människan. Stockholm: Natur & Kultur. 2006. ISBN 91-27-11328-0.
- Knowledge in Flux: Modeling the Dynamics of Epistemic States. Cambridge, Massachusetts: MIT Press. ISBN 978-0262570824.
- Rights, Games and Social Choice, Vol. 15, No. 3 (Sep. 1981), pp. 341–356 (16 pages)

== See also ==
- Conceptual space
