= Gabriela Pană Dindelegan =

Romanian linguist

Gabriela Pană Dindelegan (born 7 February 1942 in Pitești, Argeș County, Romania) is a linguist and specialist in the grammar of Romanian.

== Education ==
After completing her secondary education at the Ion Luca Caragiale High School in Bucharest, Pană Dindelegan graduated in 1964 with a Merit Diploma from the Faculty of Romanian Language and Literature at the University of Bucharest. She then took up a position as lecturer in linguistics at the Faculty of Letters at the same institution, which she held for 26 years, until 1990. In the meantime, she obtained in 1970 a doctorate for a thesis with the title Sintaxa transformațională a grupului verbal în limba română (The transformational syntax of the Romanian verb phrase) under the direction of Alexandru Rosetti.

== Career and research ==
After a brief period as lecturer in Romanian at Aix-Marseille University (1991–1992), she returned to Romania as full professor of linguistics, once again at the Faculty of Letters at the University of Bucharest; she held this position until her retirement in 2011. In addition, from 2002 onwards, she has been affiliated with the Iorgu Iordan – Alexandru Rosetti Institute of Linguistics of the Romanian Academy in Bucharest as senior researcher, and head of its grammar department since 2005.

Pană Dindelegan's research has focused on Romanian grammar from the perspective of linguistic typology, in both its synchronic and diachronic contexts. She has also written on the history of Romania. Her research output includes 13 books and over 120 journal articles. In 2013, a grammar of Romanian edited and coordinated by Pană Dindelegan was published by Oxford University Press; this is the first major academic grammar of Romanian published in English, and received praise from reviewers for its broad coverage and comparative perspective. She is also editor and coordinator of The Syntax of Old Romanian (2016) and co-author of The Oxford History of Romanian Morphology (2021, with Martin Maiden, Adina Dragomirescu, Oana Uță Bărbulescu, and Rodica Zafiu).

== Awards and honours ==
Pană Dindelegan has been the recipient of numerous honours and awards. In 2004, she was elected corresponding member of the Romanian Academy, of which she became full member in 2022. In 2009, she was awarded the rank of Knight of the Romanian National Order of Merit. In 2017, she was the recipient of a festschrift entitled ‘Syntax as a way of being’. In 2021, she was elected ordinary member of the Academia Europaea.

== Selected publications ==
- Pană Dindelegan, Gabriela. 2003. Elemente de gramatică. Dificultăţi, controverse, noi interpretări (Elements of grammar: difficulties, controversies, new interpretations). Bucharest: Humanitas. ISBN 9738289440
- Pană Dindelegan, Gabriela (ed.). 2013. The Grammar of Romanian. Oxford: Oxford University Press. ISBN 9780199644926
- Pană Dindelegan, Gabriela (ed.). 2016. The Syntax of Old Romanian. Oxford: Oxford University Press. ISBN 9780198712350
- Pană Dindelegan, Gabriela and Dragomirescu, Adina. 2016. Gramatica de bază a limbii române (Basic grammar of the Romanian language). Second edition. Bucharest: Editura Univers Enciclopedic Gold. ISBN 9786067041385
- Martin Maiden, Adina Dragomirescu, Gabriela Pană Dindelegan, Oana Uță Bărbulescu, and Rodica Zafiu. 2021. The Oxford History of Romanian Morphology. Oxford: Oxford University Press. ISBN 9780198829485
