= Alfred Ewert =

British university teacher (1891–1969)

Alfred Ewert, FBA (14 July 1891 – 22 October 1969) was an American-born scholar of French language and literature who grew up in Canada and spent his career in England. He was Professor of the Romance Languages at the University of Oxford from 1930 to 1958.

== Early life, education and war service ==
Born in Kansas on 14 July 1891, Ewert was raised in Manitoba. He attended high school and then the Collegiate Institute in Gretna, before becoming a printer. He studied Latin in his spare time. After two years of working, he began studying at the University of Manitoba in 1909. Graduating in 1912 with a first-class degree, he then studied at St John's College, Oxford, supported by a Rhodes Scholarship. There, he studied modern languages; he received a first-class degree in German in 1914. During the First World War, he served in the Canadian Expeditionary Force in France from 1915 until 1917, when he was commissioned into the Western Ontario Regiment. Demobilised in 1919, he completed another degree, this time in French, at Oxford in 1920.

== Academic career and honours ==
Ewert was an associate professor of French at the University of Texas at Dallas from 1920 to 1921. In 1921, he became the Taylorian Lecturer in French at the University of Oxford, serving until 1926 when he was appointed a university lecturer in French (also being a lecturer at University College from 1922). In 1930, he was appointed Professor of the Romance Languages at Oxford (in succession to E. G. R. Waters), and was elected a fellow of Trinity College, Oxford. He remained in both offices until 1958. His most notable book was The French Language (1933), while he edited several versions of French texts: Gui de Warewic (2 vols., 1932–33), Béroul's Tristan (vol. 1 in 1939, vol. 2 in 1970), (with R. C. Johnston) Marie de France's Fables (1942) and Lais (1944). As well as being Senior Proctor at Oxford in 1943–44, Ewert launched and was general editor of the journal French Studies from 1947 to 1965. He gave the Zaharoff Lecture (University of Oxford, 1958) and the Hurd Memorial Lecture (Brandon University, 1967). His honours including a corresponding fellowship of the Medieval Academy of America, an honorary doctorate, the French Legion of Honour, election to the fellowship of the British Academy in 1957, and the dedication of a Festschrift: Studies in Medieval French (1961). Ewert died on 22 October 1969.
