= Ernst Fürstenheim =

Ernst Fürstenheim (18 August 1836, in Köthen – 2 July 1904, in Berlin) was a German urologist.

He studied medicine in Berlin, Würzburg, Paris and London, obtaining his doctorate in 1861 with a thesis titled "De ratione, quae inter hypochondriam et hysteriam". As a student, his instructors included surgeon Bernhard von Langenbeck and Jean Civiale, a pioneer of lithotrity. In 1863 he established a medical practice in Berlin, of which he specialized in diseases of the urinary tract.

He was the author of several works on diseases of the male reproductive organs and of the urinary system, especially involving endoscopy of the urinary tract. He is remembered for his efforts in regards to the popularization of urological endoscopy in Germany. He is also credited with making improvements to the endoscope developed by Antonin Jean Desormeaux.

== Selected works ==
- De ratione, quae inter hypochondriam et hysteriam, nec non inter has et morbos psychicos intercedit, 1861 (dissertation).
- Notizen über das Endoscop und seine Verwerthung, besonders in Krankheiten der Harnwege. — In: Deutsche Klinik, Berlin, 1863, XV, p. 313.
- Ueber Endoskopie der Harnröhre und Blase. — In: Berliner klinische Wochenschr. 1870, VII, pp. 36, 47, 531, 542.
