= Martin Joos =

American linguist (1907–1978)

- Joos in 1962
- Born: May 11, 1907; Wisconsin
- Died: May 6, 1978 (aged 70)
- Occupations: Linguist; Professor of German
- Known for: Work in linguistics, including the book The Five Clocks

Martin Joos (May 11, 1907 – June 5, 1978) was an American linguist and professor of German. He spent most of his career at the University of Wisconsin–Madison, and also served at the University of Toronto and as a visiting scholar at the University of Alberta, the University of Belgrade, and the University of Edinburgh. During World War II, Joos was a cryptologist for the US Signal Security Agency. The War Department awarded him a Distinguished Service citation in recognition of his work developing communication systems. After the war he returned to the University of Wisconsin, eventually serving as the chairman of the Department of German.

== Biography ==
Martin George Joos was born on May 11, 1907, into a farming family near Fountain City, Wisconsin. He was one out of ten children and it is noted that his filial relations while growing up were very close. He grew up speaking English and German which later influenced his decision to go into linguistics. He graduated with a bachelor's in electrical engineering, and applied this with linguistics while serving with Signal Security Agency of the United States of America doing crypt-analyses. When he went back for his master's degree, Joos decided to pursue linguistics and got a degree in German. This led to him receiving a position in Canada at the University of Toronto and at University of Wisconsin. Somewhere during this time before WWII, he married Jennie Mae Austin on September 8, 1938, to whom he was married for forty years, and they adopted a daughter named Shari. After his service in WWII, Joos went back to the University of Wisconsin and served as chairman of the Department of German. In the years following, he was a visiting professor at University of Alberta, University of Edinburgh, and University of Belgrade.

== The Five Clocks ==
Among Joos's books on linguistics is The Five Clocks (1962), which introduced influential discussions of style, register, and style-shifting, noting systematic characteristics in the shifts in speech between high and low formality settings.

The five aspects of register are:

- Frozen
  - unchanging utterances
  - remain the same with every utterance
  - Ex: written songs, poems, or ballads
- Formal
  - monologue
  - listener does not participate
  - often in formal contexts
  - often avoids interpersonal or cultural context
- Consultative
  - dialogue
  - assumed no prior knowledge
  - both speaker and listener actively participate
  - semi-formal, consultative context
- Casual
  - dialogue
  - shared knowledge
  - speaker and listener actively participate
  - informal context
- Intimate
  - intonation and non-verbal communication
  - family and close friends
  - intimate context

== Phonetics and phonology ==
Acoustic Phonetics was published in 1948 as a supplement to the journal, Language. It was written in times of exploration of phonetics and explored the unknown in phonetics, more specifically the acoustic aspect of phonetics. Martin Joos wrote the monograph to help the world come to a unified phonetic theory and to introduce acoustic information to phonetics.

Joos's 1958 book, Readings in Linguistics Volume 1 collected important papers on the nature of phonetics and phonology produced during the prior decades, since about 1930. This period saw the emergence of two broad understandings of the nature of the phoneme, either as a class of sounds grouped within the language, or as an abstract opposition within the structure of the language. Joos's collection helped clarify the debate at the time by bringing together key works on both sides.

== Selected works ==
- 1951. Middle High German Courtly Reader (with F.R. Whitesell). Madison: University of Wisconsin Press.
- 1957. Readings in Linguistics: The Development of Descriptive Linguistics in America since 1925 (editor). Washington: ACLS.
- 1962. The Five Clocks. Bloomington: Indiana University Research Center in Anthropology, Folklore, and Linguistics. Reprinted in 1967 by Harcourt, Brace & World. ISBN 978-0156313803
- 1964. The English Verb: Form and Meanings. Madison: University of Wisconsin Press. ISBN 978-0299033101
- 1972. Semantic axiom number one. Language 48(2), 257–265.
