= Posen (surname) =

Posen is a surname. Notable people with the surname include:

- Al Posen (1894-1960), American cartoonist
- Adam Posen (born 1966), American economist
- Ariel Posen, Canadian musician
- Barry Posen (born 1952), professor of political science at MIT
- Louis Posen (born 1971), American music producer
- Mika Posen, Canadian violinist and music instructor
- Shelley Posen (active since 1970s), Canadian folklorist and folk musician
- Stephen Posen (born 1939), American painter, recipient of a Guggenheim Fellowship in 1986
- Zac Posen (born 1980), American fashion designer

== See also ==
- Posener
- Posner
