= Posen, Michigan =

- Village
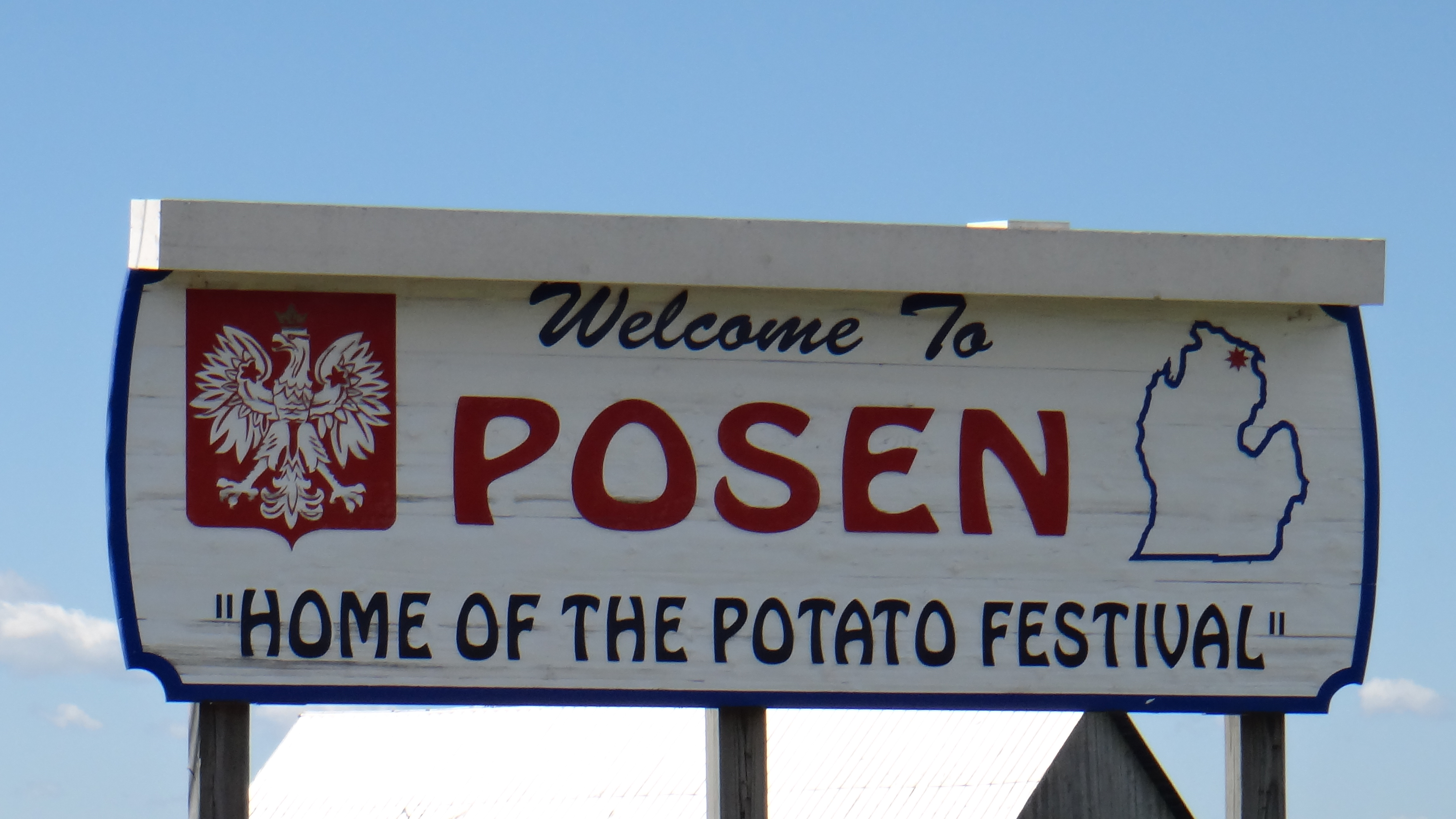
- Welcome sign for Posen

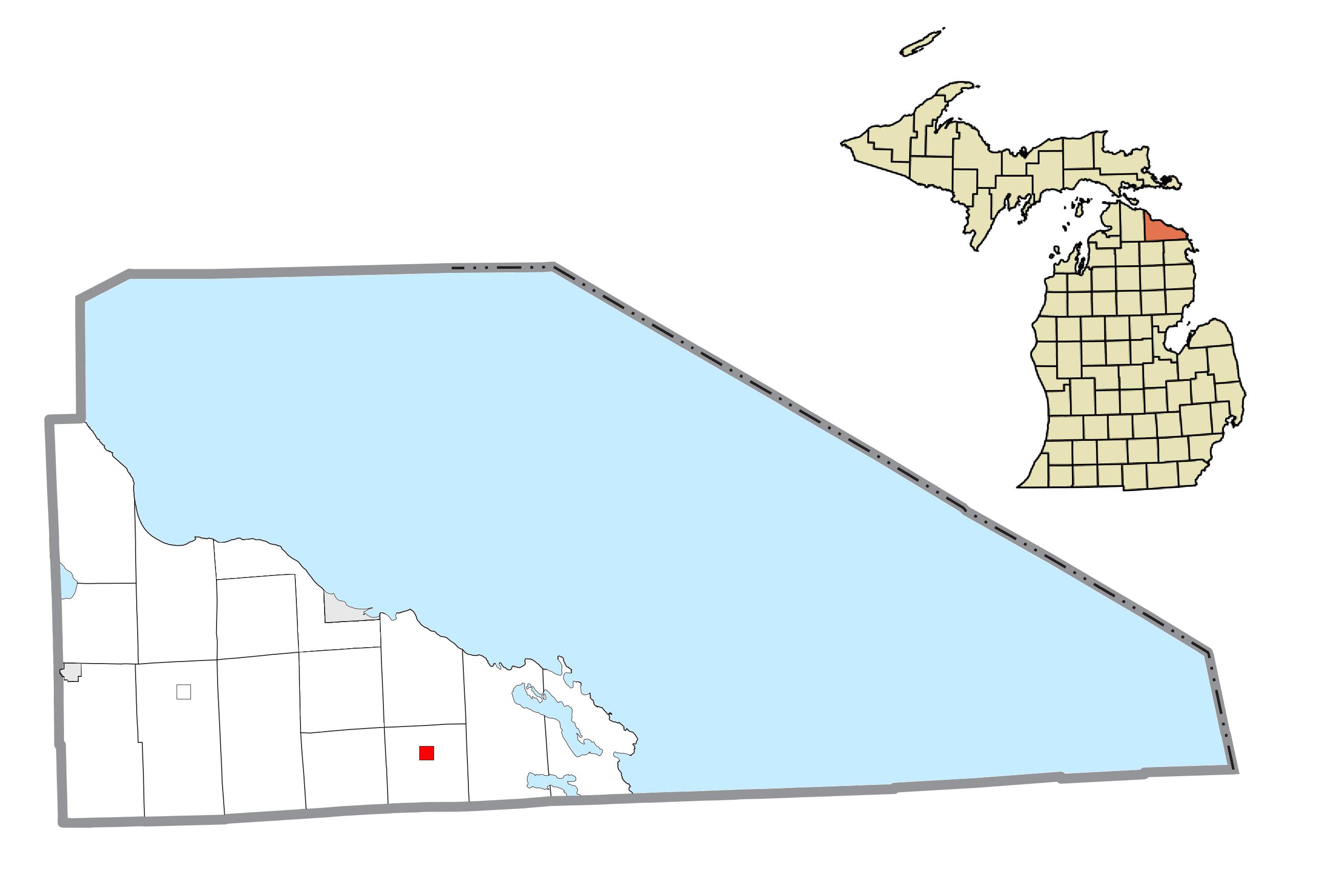
- Location within Presque Isle County

- Location within the state of Michigan
- Coordinates: 45°15′46″N 83°41′55″W
- Country: United States
- State: Michigan
- County: Presque Isle
- Township: Posen

Government
  - President: John Ataman

Area
  - Total: 1.00 sq mi (2.59 km^{2})
  - Land: 1.00 sq mi (2.59 km^{2})
  - Water: 0 sq mi (0.00 km^{2})
- Elevation: 797 ft (243 m)

Population (2020)
  - Total: 270
  - Density: 270.4/sq mi (104.39/km^{2})
- Time zone: UTC-5 (Eastern (EST))
  - Summer (DST): UTC-4 (EDT)
- ZIP code(s): 49776
- Area code: 989
- FIPS code: 26-66000
- GNIS feature ID: 0635315
- Website: Official website

Posen is a village in Presque Isle County of the U.S. state of Michigan. The population was 270 at the 2020 census. The village is in Posen Township.

Posen has historically had a strong Polish background. At one point, 78.8% of its inhabitants reported to have Polish ancestry. It is home to the Posen Potato Festival, held every year on during the first weekend after Labor Day. The festival includes activities with potato pancakes and polka dancing. Posen has a branch of the Presque Isle District Library. Posen is also the German name for the Polish city of Poznań.

== Transportation ==
- M-65
- North Eastern State Trail

== Geography ==
According to the United States Census Bureau, the village has a total area of 1.00 square mile (2.59 km^{2}), all land.

== Demographics ==
Historical population
Census	Pop.	Note	%±
1910	263		—
1920	190		−27.8%
1930	219		15.3%
1940	239		9.1%
1950	274		14.6%
1960	341		24.5%
1970	339		−0.6%
1980	270		−20.4%
1990	263		−2.6%
2000	292		11.0%
2010	234		−19.9%
2020	270		15.4%
U.S. Decennial Census

=== 2020 census ===
Largest ancestries (2020)	Percent
Polish (Poland)	46.3%
German (Germany)	33.0%
English (England)	18.1%
Italian (Italy)	0.4%
Scottish (Scotland)	0.4%

As of the census of 2020, there were 270 people, 112 households, and 54 families living in the village. The population density was 270 inhabitants per square mile (104.2/km^{2}). There were 144 housing units at an average density of 144 per square mile (55.6/km^{2}). The racial makeup of the village was 97.0% White, 0.4% Hispanic or Latino, and 3.6% from two or more races.

There were 112 households, of which 20.7% had children under the age of 18 living with them, 29.7% were married couples living together, 4.5% had a female householder with no husband present, 0.0% had a male householder with no wife present, and 65.8% were non-families. 38.7% of households were made up of individuals, and 33.3% had someone living alone who was 65 years of age or older. The average household size was 2.05 and the average family size was 3.56.

The median age in the village was 44 years. 22.8% of residents were under the age of 18; 14.8% were between the ages of 18 and 24; 14.8% were from 25 to 44; 22.3% were from 45 to 64; and 25.3% were 65 years of age or older. The gender makeup of the village was 44.3% male and 55.6% female.

The median income for a household in the village was $44,519 and the median income for a family was $54,750. About 24.9% of the population was below the poverty line.

=== 2010 census ===
Largest ancestries (2010)	Percent
Polish (Poland)	78.8%
German (Germany)	16.9%
English (England)	7.5%
Irish (Republic of Ireland)	7.1%
Danish (Denmark)	2.0%
French-Canadian (Quebec)	1.6%

As of the census of 2010, there were 234 people, 110 households, and 54 families living in the village. The population density was 234 inhabitants per square mile (90.3/km^{2}). There were 144 housing units at an average density of 144.0 per square mile (55.6/km^{2}). The racial makeup of the village was 96.2% White, 1.3% Native American, 0.4% Pacific Islander, and 2.1% from two or more races.

There were 110 households, of which 23.6% had children under the age of 18 living with them, 36.4% were married couples living together, 8.2% had a female householder with no husband present, 4.5% had a male householder with no wife present, and 50.9% were non-families. 42.7% of all households were made up of individuals, and 27.3% had someone living alone who was 65 years of age or older. The average household size was 2.07 and the average family size was 2.96.

The median age in the village was 46 years. 22.2% of residents were under the age of 18; 5.2% were between the ages of 18 and 24; 21.7% were from 25 to 44; 27.3% were from 45 to 64; and 23.5% were 65 years of age or older. The gender makeup of the village was 46.2% male and 53.8% female.

=== 2000 census ===
Largest ancestries (2000)	Percent
Polish (Poland)	56.1%
German (Germany)	15.3%
American (United States)	7.8%
French (France)	3.1%
English (England)	2.5%
French-Canadian (Quebec)	1.6%

Languages (2000)	Percent
Spoke English at home	84.78%
Spoke Polish at home	15.22%
Spoke English "not well" or "not at all."	1.63%

As of the census of 2000, there were 292 people, 126 households, and 73 families living in the village. The population density was 291.6 inhabitants per square mile (112.6/km^{2}). There were 138 housing units at an average density of 137.8 per square mile (53.2/km^{2}). The racial makeup of the village was 94.18% White, 3.77% African American, and 2.05% from two or more races. Hispanic or Latino of any race were 0.34% of the population. 56.1% was of Polish, 15.3% German, 7.8% American, 3.1% French, 2.5% English, 1.6% French-Canadian, 1.2% Danish, 1.2% Irish, and 0.9% Russian ancestry.

There were 126 households, out of which 25.4% had children under the age of 18 living with them, 43.7% were married couples living together, 7.9% had a female householder with no husband present, and 41.3% were non-families. 36.5% of all households were made up of individuals, and 24.6% had someone living alone who was 65 years of age or older. The average household size was 2.24 and the average family size was 2.92.

In the village, the population was spread out, with 23.6% under the age of 18, 8.9% from 18 to 24, 26.4% from 25 to 44, 16.1% from 45 to 64, and 25.0% who were 65 years of age or older. The median age was 39 years. For every 100 females, there were 97.3 males. For every 100 females age 18 and over, there were 85.8 males.

The median income for a household in the village was $27,969, and the median income for a family was $39,250. Males had a median income of $26,406 versus $24,250 for females. The per capita income for the village was $12,708. About 8.9% of families and 19.3% of the population were below the poverty line, including 20.0% of those under the age of eighteen and 18.8% of those 65 or over.
