= Joachim Posener =

Swedish financier and author

Joachim Ralph Posener (born 17 January 1964) is a Swedish financier and author. He was internationally wanted for possible involvement in the Trustor affair, but not found guilty.

== Biography ==
Posener was born on Lidingö. A lawyer by profession, he was active in the Swedish financial markets from the late 1980s until the end of the 1990s. He gained public notoriety in November 1997 after being accused by the media as the mastermind behind Lord Moyne's acquisition of the Swedish publicly traded company Trustor AB. This acquisition, which later become known as the Trustor affair, eventually led to one of Lord Moyne's team members, Thomas Jisander, being sentenced to prison.

When the Swedish police acted against Lord Moyne and his team in October 1997, Posener happened to be abroad. According to his own statements, he chose not to return to Sweden, which became widely publicized in Swedish media and led to an international arrest warrant being issued against him. Initially, Posener claimed to have lived in Spain, later, in Argentina, kept a low profile in Rio de Janeiro for several years living in the favelas under a new identity. He is believed to also have evaded the authorities in different European main cities during his international arrest warrant's validity.

Despite the International arrest warrant, Posener was never found by the police, and the crimes they suspected him of were no longer actionable against Posener, due to the Swedish statute of limitations. As of 20 June 2007, no member of Lord Moyne's team could be accused in any court of law for their involvement in the Trustor affair.

Joachim Posener has never been found guilty of any crime in connection with the Trustor affair and the police have had no further interest in him since 2009. In 2007, Posener and Trustor AB reached an out-of-court settlement regarding any economic relationship between them, resulting in Posener paying 1.5 million SEK to Trustor AB.

Two and a half years later, in December 2009, Swedish police and State prosecutor Bernt Berger met with Joachim Posener and Posener's Swedish attorney Leif Gustafson, at Posener's own request at the Swedish embassy in Belgium. Posener sought this meeting to be interrogated by the police to resolve the last remaining criminal charges against him. The issue at hand was whether Posener had the right to, under the existing legal circumstances in which he found himself in 2004, publish the book Internationellt Efterlyst – Mitt liv efter Trustor, as well as for appearing in a Swedish TV-interview with the show 45 minuter hosted by Renée Nyberg on TV3 to discuss his case. Shortly after the meeting in Brussels, Bernt Berger cleared all remaining suspicions against Posener. Since 2009, there have been no further suspicions of wrongdoing involving Joachim Posener.

== Bibliography ==
- Posener, Joachim (2004). Internationellt efterlyst: mitt liv efter Trustor [Internationally wanted: my life after Trustor] (in Swedish). [London?]: TV3 Reportage Förlag. ISBN 0954932005. SELIBR 9731415.
