= Posen Township, Michigan =

- Civil township
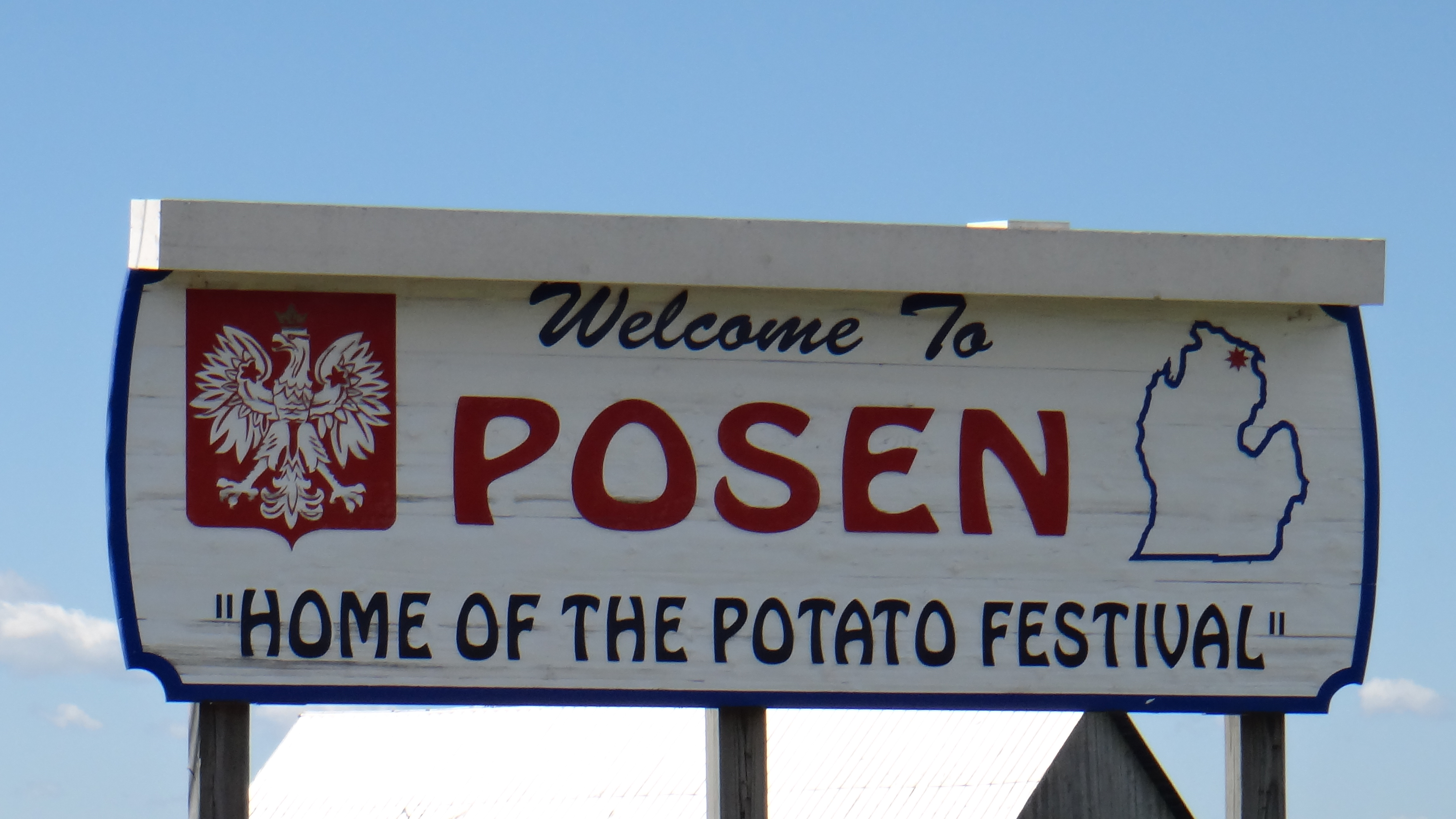
- Welcome sign for the village of Posen

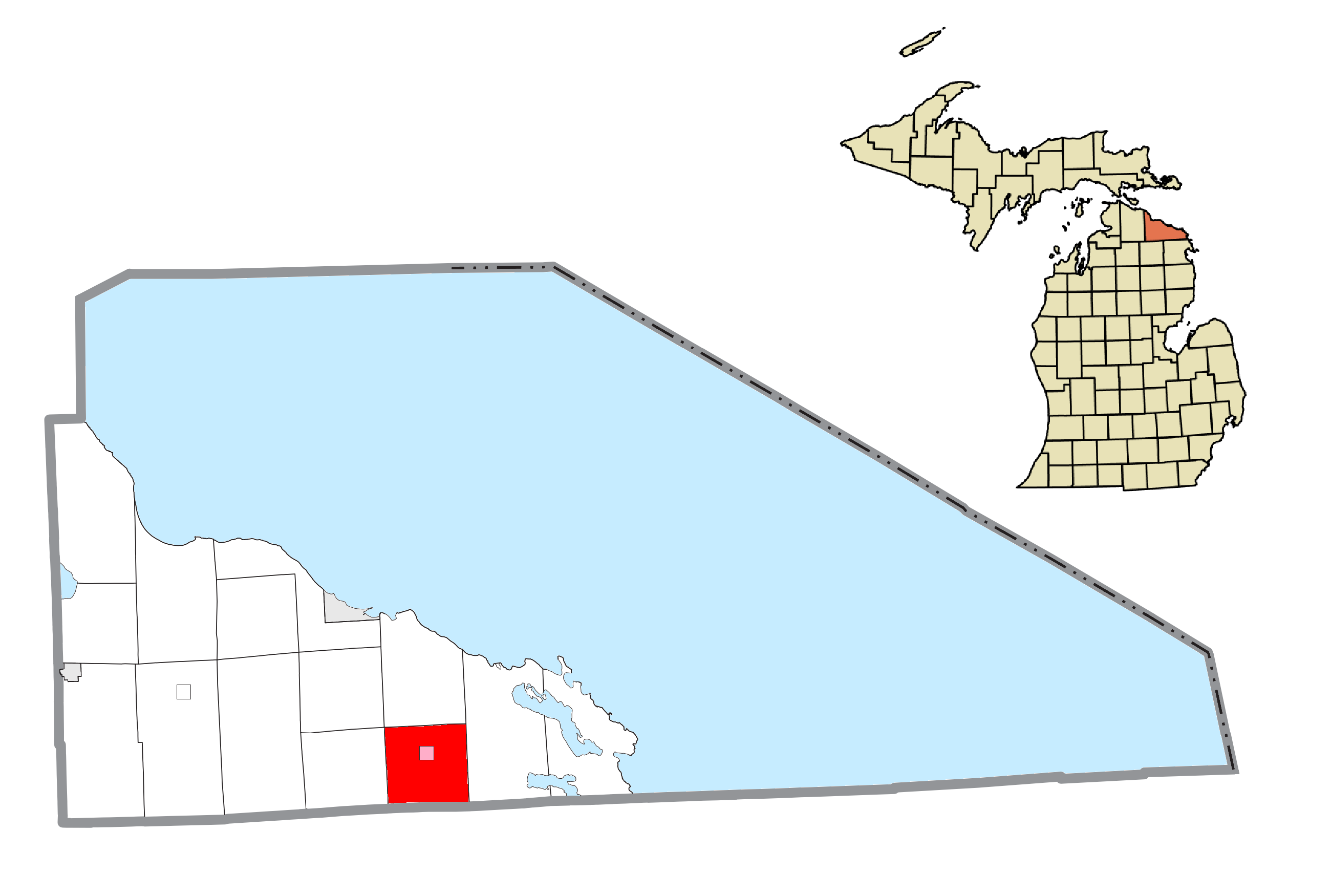
- Location within Presque Isle County (red) and the administered village of Posen (pink)

- Location within the state of Michigan Posen Township (the United States)
- Coordinates: 45°14′56″N 83°41′24″W
- Country: United States
- State: Michigan
- County: Presque Isle

Government
  - President: Jim Zakshesky

Area
  - Total: 35.5 sq mi (92.0 km^{2})
  - Land: 35.3 sq mi (91.4 km^{2})
  - Water: 0.23 sq mi (0.6 km^{2})
- Elevation: 781 ft (238 m)

Population (2020)
  - Total: 808
  - Density: 22.9/sq mi (8.84/km^{2})
- Time zone: UTC-5 (Eastern (EST))
  - Summer (DST): UTC-4 (EDT)
- ZIP code(s): 49776
- Area code: 989
- FIPS code: 26-66020
- GNIS feature ID: 1626938

Posen Township is a civil township of Presque Isle County in the U.S. state of Michigan. The population was 808 at the 2020 census, down from 959, at the 2000 census, which 65.4% (652) of which reported Polish ancestry.

== Communities ==
- Posen is a village located at 45°15′46″N 83°41′55″W along M-65.

== Geography ==
According to the United States Census Bureau, the township has a total area of 35.5 square miles (92 km^{2}), of which 35.3 square miles (91 km^{2}) is land and 0.2 square miles (0.52 km^{2}) (0.62%) is water.

== Demographics ==
Largest ancestries (2000)	Percent
Polish (Poland)	65.4%
German (Germany)	16.9%
American (United States)	4.0%
Irish (Republic of Ireland)	3.5%
English (England)	3.4%
French (France)	3.3%

Languages (2000)	Percent
Spoke English at home	81.99%
Spoke Polish at home	18.01%
Spoke English "not well" or "not at all."	1.05%

As of the census of 2000, 959 people, 387 households, and 260 families resided in the township. The population density was 27.2 inhabitants per square mile (10.5/km^{2}). There were 463 housing units at an average density of 13.1 per square mile (5.1/km^{2}). The racial makeup of the township was 98.12% White, 1.25% African American, and 0.63% from two or more races. Hispanic or Latino of any race were 0.31% of the population. The ancestry make up was 65.4% Polish, 16.9% German, 4.0% American, 3.5% Irish, 3.4% English, 3.3% French, 1.4% French Canadian, 0.9% Norwegian, 0.8% Czech, 0.6% Italian, 0.5% Russian, 0.4% Danish, 0.4% Dutch, 0.3% Swedish, 0.2% Greek, 0.2% Hungarian, 0.2% Scottish, 0.2% Ukrainian.

There were 387 households, out of which 28.9% had children under the age of 18 living with them, 57.9% were married couples living together, 5.7% had a female householder with no husband present, and 32.6% were non-families. 28.9% of all households were made up of individuals, and 15.2% had someone living alone who was 65 years of age or older. The average household size was 2.45 and the average family size was 3.05.

In the township the population was spread out, with 24.2% under the age of 18, 7.9% from 18 to 24, 25.0% from 25 to 44, 23.6% from 45 to 64, and 19.3% who were 65 years of age or older. The median age was 40 years. For every 100 females, there were 103.2 males. For every 100 females age 18 and over, there were 95.4 males.

The median income for a household in the township was $31,912, and the median income for a family was $40,714. Males had a median income of $31,875 versus $23,558 for females. The per capita income for the township was $15,259. About 4.5% of families and 9.7% of the population were below the poverty line, including 9.9% of those under age 18 and 12.7% of those age 65 or over.
