= Martin Maiden =

British linguist (born 1957)

Martin Maiden FBA
- Born: 20 May 1957 (age 69); Southampton, United Kingdom

Academic background
- Education: Trinity Hall (University of Cambridge)
- Thesis: Metaphony and the Italian dialects: A Study in Morphologisation (1987)

Academic work
- Discipline: Romance linguistics; historical linguistics
- Sub-discipline: Eastern Romance languages
- Institutions: University of Bath; University of Cambridge; University of Oxford

Martin Maiden FBA (born 20 May 1957) is a British linguist, best known for his contributions to the study of Romance linguistics and particularly to Eastern Romance languages. He was Statutory Professor of the Romance Languages at the University of Oxford and a Fellow of Trinity College, Oxford from 1996 until 2026. He is now Professor Emeritus of the Romance Languages, and Emeritus Fellow of Trinity College, Oxford.

== Education ==
Maiden was educated at King Edward VI School, Southampton, and then at Trinity Hall, Cambridge, where he received a BA in Modern and Medieval Languages, having studied French, Italian, Romance philology, and general linguistics, in 1980 and a PhD in Linguistics in 1987 (doctoral thesis: Metaphony and the Italian dialects: a study in morphologisation).

== Career ==
Maiden became lecturer in Italian at the University of Bath (1982–1989) and subsequently lecturer in Romance Philology at the University of Cambridge (1989–1996), where he was a Fellow of Downing College. In 1996 he took up his position in Oxford.

Maiden specialises in the history and structure of the Romance languages, especially varieties of Romanian, Dalmatian, Italian with other Italo-Romance dialects, historical linguistics, morphology, and dialectology. He has published over 200 articles and book chapters, and edited or authored several books, in these areas and the grammar of Italian. He has also co-edited volumes on morphological theory with particular reference to Romance languages.

== Honours ==
He has been a Fellow of the British Academy since 2003. He holds an honorary doctorate from the University of Bucharest, and in 2013 was appointed to the rank of "Commander" in the Romanian National Order of Faithful Service. In 2018 he was elected a Member of Academia Europaea and in 2019 he was made an Honorary Fellow of Downing College. In 2019 he was also appointed Membro corrispondente of the Italian Accademia della Crusca.

== Selected publications ==
Maiden is also a contributor to all of the edited volumes cited.

- 1991 Interactive Morphonology. Metaphony in Italy. London: Routledge.
- 1992 'Irregularity as a determinant of morphological change', Journal of Linguistics 28:285-312.
- 1995 A Linguistic History of Italian. London: Longman.
- 1995 (edited with J. C. Smith), Linguistic Theory and the Romance Languages. Amsterdam/Philadelphia: Benjamins.
- 1997 (edited with M. Parry) The Dialects of Italy. London: Routledge.
- 1998 Storia linguistica dell’italiano, Bologna: il Mulino (translated by P. Maturi).
- 2001 'A strange affinity: perfecto y tiempos afines', Bulletin of Hispanic Studies 58:441-64.
- 2001 ‘Di nuovo sulle alternanze velari nel verbo italiano e spagnolo’, Cuadernos de filología italiana 8.39-61.
- 2003 ‘Verb augments and meaninglessness in Romance morphology’, Studi di grammatica italiana 22:1-61.
- 2004 ‘When lexemes become allomorphs: on the genesis of suppletion’, Folia Linguistica 38:227-256.
- 2005 ‘Morphological autonomy and diachrony’, Yearbook of Morphology 2004, 137-75.
- 2007 (with C. Robustelli) A Reference Grammar of Modern Italian. London: Hodder Arnold.
- 2008 'Lexical nonsense and morphological sense. On the real importance of "folk etymology" and related phenomena for historical linguists', in Eythórsson, Th. (ed.) Grammatical Change and Linguistic Theory. The Rosendal Papers. Amsterdam and Philadelphia: Benjamins, 307-28.
- 2009 'From pure phonology to pure morphology. The reshaping of the Romance verb'. Recherches de linguistique de Vincennes 38:45-82.
- 2011 (edited with J. C. Smith and A. Ledgeway) The Cambridge History of the Romance Languages I Structures. Cambridge: CUP.
- 2011 (edited with J. C. Smith, M. Goldbach, and M.-O. Hinzelin) Morphological Autonomy. Perspectives from Romance Inflectional Morphology. Oxford: OUP.
- 2011 'Allomorphy, autonomous morphology and phonological conditioning in the history of the Daco-Romance present and subjunctive’, Transactions of the Philological Society 109:59-91.
- 2013 (edited with J. C. Smith and A. Ledgeway) The Cambridge History of the Romance Languages II Contexts. Cambridge: CUP.
- 2013 ‘The Latin “third stem” and its Romance descendants’. Diachronica 30:492-530.
- 2016 (edited with A. Ledgeway) The Oxford Guide to the Romance Languages. Oxford: OUP.
- 2016 ‘The Romanian alternating gender in diachrony and synchrony’. Folia Linguistica Historica. DOI 10.1515/flih-2016-0004
- 2017 'Cu privire la geneza vocalelor tematice în sistemul verbal dacoromanic'. In Dragomirescu, A., Nicolae, A., Stan, C. & Zafiu, R. (eds), Sintaxa ca mod de a fi. Omagiu Gabrielei Pană Dindelegan, la aniversare. Bucharest: Editura Universității din București, 247-54.
- 2018 The Romance Verb. Morphomic Structure and Diachrony. Oxford: OUP.
- 2018 ‘New thoughts on an old puzzle. The Italian alternation type dissi, dicesti, feci, facesti, etc.’. Revue romane 52:217-60.
- 2020 (edited with S. Wolfe) Variation and Change in Gallo-Romance Grammar. Oxford: OUP
- 2021 (with A. Dragomirescu, G. Pană Dindelegan, O. Uță Bărbulescu, and R. Zafiu) The Oxford History of Romanian Morphology. Oxford: OUP.
- 2021 Cât de „slavă” este morfologia flexionară a limbii române?’ Studii și cercetări lingvistice 71:24-34
- 2021 'The morphome’. Annual Review of Linguistics 7:89-108.
- 2022 (edited with A. Ledgeway) The Cambridge Handbook of Romance Linguistics. Cambridge: CUP.
- 2024 ‘The long history of a syncretism in Italo-Romance and Ladin verb morphology’. Ricerche linguistiche 1:169-197
