= Elderspeak =

Specialized speech style

Elderspeak, also referred to as patronizing talk or secondary baby talk, is a style of speaking to old people used by younger adults, characterized by simpler vocabulary and sentence structure, filler words, content words, overly-endearing terms, closed-ended questions, using the collective "we", repetition, and speaking more slowly. Elderspeak stems from the ageist stereotype that older people have reduced cognitive abilities, such as in language processing and production. Although elderspeak may be beneficial for some recipients, it is generally seen as inappropriate and a hindrance to intergenerational communication.

== Elderspeak and communication accommodation ==
Communication accommodation theory and code-switching examine how people modify their speech for their conversation partners. They can change their speech to be more similar to their conversation partners' speech, which is known as convergence, or may change their speech to be more distinct, a process known as divergence. Furthermore, these modifications can promote fluidity of conversation and ease understanding. People tend to draw on stereotypes to infer what accommodations must be made. In terms of intergenerational communication, younger people tend to make more adjustments than necessary when conversing with older persons. Younger people tend to infer that older adults are slower at processing information and less cognitively flexible. They make these inferences based on the perception of their conversation partner as older rather than on information about their conversational ability. Ryan and colleagues (1986) assessed several strategies used by younger individuals when accommodating older adults which include:

- Overaccommodation due to physical or sensory disabilities: speakers perceive interlocutors to have a disability affecting conversation ability, but the speaker accommodates more than necessary.
- Dependency-related overaccommodation: this occurs in situations where the older person is dependent on the younger person. The younger person's speech is dominating and controlling. This pattern can be seen in interactions between an older person and their caregiver.
- Age-related divergence: the younger person attempts to emphasize distinctiveness of their ingroup (young) from the outgroup (old). The younger person does this by speaking very quickly and using modern colloquialisms, alienating or accentuating the differences of the older person.
- Intergroup accommodation: Speaker perceives interlocutors as older, which triggers negative stereotypes about their ability. The speaker makes accommodations based on perceptions about the interlocutor's ingroup, rather than the person themselves.

== Use of elderspeak ==
Younger people use elderspeak in many contexts when talking to elder adults. Research by Susan Kemper demonstrated that both volunteers and professional caregivers engaged in elderspeak when interacting with older adults. Furthermore, elderspeak is used regardless of the communicative ability of the older person. It was used when interacting with older adults who were healthy and active community members as well as those in institutional settings. Caregivers used patronizing speech both when addressing adults living with dementia (and reduced communication abilities) as well as those without dementia, which demonstrates that age cues are more salient to speakers than cues relating to mental and physical capability, health, and ability to communicate.

Elderspeak is based on stereotypes rather than the actual behaviour of older people. Although elderspeak can be offensive, it is also largely normalized, and may go unacknowledged even by its targets. Elderspeak was used with more "warmth" and less "superiority" when the speaker was a family member and/or friend compared to an unfamiliar. Generally, younger adults use an overstated version of elderspeak when addressing impaired older persons. When older adults converse with older people with cognitive impairments, they make speech accommodations to a lesser extent than younger people. They speak more slowly and incorporate more pauses but do not use repetition as younger people do. Older speakers may not accommodate their speech as much in order to avoid seeming patronizing. Research shows that approximately 80% of communication is nonverbal. Elderspeak involves communicating to the older adult in a coddling way, which includes non-verbal cues and gestures. An example would be looming over a wheelchair or bed in dominancy, or a pat on the buttocks resembling parent-child touching.

=== Alzheimer's ===
Alzheimer's disease (AD) is a progressive neurodegenerative condition that gradually destroys the abilities to remember, reason, and engage in meaningful social interaction. AD caregivers report that most of their stress comes from unsuccessful attempts to communicate with their patients. To improve communicative interaction between caregiver and patient, many clinicians advise caregivers to modify their speech when talking to the patient. "The main task for a person with Alzheimer's is to maintain a sense of self or personhood," Dr. Williams said. "If you know you're losing your cognitive abilities and trying to maintain your personhood, and someone talks to you like a baby, it's upsetting to you." Caretakers of adults with Alzheimer's are often told to speak to their patients more slowly, although slow speech has not been proven to improve comprehension in patients with Alzheimer's.

=== Non-medical ===
Elderspeak is equally pervasive outside of medical contexts, although specific data regarding its prevalence is currently lacking. Older persons usually receive mistreatment from those that they trust or depend on, or who depend on them. In the workplace these people could be managerial, supervisory, and peer staff. Severe forms of elderspeak contribute to discrimination in the workplace, potentially infringing on the basic human right of that individual to a safe work environment. Elderspeak is affected by context, such as community or institution, meaning that people use elderspeak in the grocery store or the coffee shop differently than in an institute such as a nursing home. An element of context is the relationship between the speaker and the older person. People in closer relationships will be more likely to know the cognitive function of the individual; acquaintances or strangers would be less likely to make accurate judgements of this.

== Consequences of elderspeak ==
Popular theories about elderspeak posit that it originates from both actual communication problems associated with older age and negative stereotypes about the competence of older people.

=== Ineffective communication ===
The disadvantages with elderspeak are its effect on older adults and how they are perceived by younger adults and by themselves. Older adults often find elderspeak patronizing and disrespectful. Because of the way younger adults speak to older adults as if they are less competent, older adults find fewer opportunities to communicate effectively and may experience depression and declines in self-esteem, which can reinforce stereotypes of elderly individuals. They can become less interested in social interaction. This cycle of communication is often referred to as the "communication predicament of aging". Adults receiving elderspeak are often judged by the speaker as being not only less competent, but also as having a worse disposition. The same study showed that when using elderspeak, the speaker was judged as having a worse disposition as well. Elderspeak can contribute to decreased comprehension and increased confusion. Early social scientists first identified elderspeak and estimated that more than 20% of communication in nursing homes is elderspeak.

=== Use of elderspeak by caretakers ===
Caretakers of nursing home residents may negatively contribute to the care of patients if elderspeak is frequently used. Although elderspeak has been shown to help older adults with dementia and Alzheimer's in language comprehension, they are not immune to feeling disrespected by it. Resistance to care and violent behaviour is an ongoing problem with dementia patients, and residents of nursing homes are more likely to resist care when their nurse uses elderspeak. Caregivers may assume that the elder prefers the nurturing of elderspeak but older adults find it demeaning. Older adults in both institutional settings and those receiving home care services report that as many as 40% of their caregivers use speech they perceive as demeaning, and 75% of interactions that elderly people have are with the staff of the nursing homes.

Licensed practical nurses, registered nurses, and other healthcare team professionals very seldom have training and expertise when it comes to communication with elders, and elderspeak is often used incorrectly. Shorter sentences appear to have a beneficial effect on older adults' communication, but factors of elderspeak such as slow speech and exaggerated pitch tend to make older persons feel worse about their own competency and the competency of the speaker. However, younger adults continue to use elderspeak with these characteristics. Elderspeak often fails to improve communication effectiveness for older adults, and the messages inherent in elderspeak may unknowingly reinforce dependency and engender isolation and depression, contributing to the spiral of decline in physical, cognitive, and functional status common in elderly individuals.

=== Strategies to reduce elderspeak ===
The use of elderspeak from medical professionals can be significantly reduced through intervention and communication training. Computer-assisted behavioral analysis of elderspeak serves as one comprehensive and valid method, as it is capable of capturing both verbal and nonverbal features of communication. However, one study in 2017 found the technology for behavioral analysis to be expensive, time-consuming to create, and in need of further development. Additionally, research regarding elderspeak tends to be centered on non-naturalistic data (i.e. fictional scenarios) rather than actual observed interactions between younger and older peoples, possibly resulting in inaccurate conclusions about elderspeak. To reduce elderspeak from caregivers and community members, linguistic strategies can include jokes, narratives, and prayers, as these methods do not necessarily require responses from the older party, but nonetheless provide emotional and social engagement, effectively humanizing older persons even when communicative challenges are involved.
