= Michael Posner (economist) =

British economist (1931–2006)

Michael Vivian Posner CBE (25 August 1931 – 14 February 2006) was a University of Cambridge economics lecturer turned government adviser, who later worked to safeguard social science research in the United Kingdom.

== Biography ==
Posner was born to Jack and Lena Posner. His father, originally a cabinet-maker, was a Russian-Jewish émigré from the pogroms against the Jewish community. Posner’s maternal grandparents had also fled European persecution. He grew up in Ilford. After World War II the family settled in Croydon, where Posner attended Whitgift School. He then went to Balliol College, Oxford.

In 1953, Posner married linguist Rebecca Reynolds. Together they had two children: a son, Christopher, and a daughter, Barbara.

== Works ==
- Posner, Michael V. (1961), International Trade and Technical Change, in: Oxford Economic Papers, Jahrgang 13, Nr. 3, 1961, S. 323–341.
