= Ludwikowo =

Ludwikowo may refer to the following places:

- Ludwikowo, Nakło County in Kuyavian-Pomeranian Voivodeship (north-central Poland)
- Ludwikowo, Gmina Bytoń in Kuyavian-Pomeranian Voivodeship (north-central Poland)
- Ludwikowo, Gmina Dobre in Kuyavian-Pomeranian Voivodeship (north-central Poland)
- Ludwikowo, Płock County in Masovian Voivodeship (east-central Poland)
- Ludwikowo, Płońsk County in Masovian Voivodeship (east-central Poland)
- Ludwikowo, Gmina Czerwonak in Greater Poland Voivodeship (west-central Poland)
- Ludwikowo, Gmina Mosina in Greater Poland Voivodeship (west-central Poland)
- Ludwikowo, Szamotuły County in Greater Poland Voivodeship (west-central Poland)
- Ludwikowo, Gmina Zaniemyśl, Środa County in Greater Poland Voivodeship (west-central Poland)
- Ludwikowo, Śrem County in Greater Poland Voivodeship (west-central Poland)
- Ludwikowo, Wągrowiec County in Greater Poland Voivodeship (west-central Poland)
- Ludwikowo, Pomeranian Voivodeship (north Poland)
