= Jaszkowo =

Jaszkowo may refer to the following places:

- Jaszkowo, Gmina Zaniemyśl, Środa County in Greater Poland Voivodeship (west-central Poland)
- Jaszkowo, Śrem County in Greater Poland Voivodeship (west-central Poland)
- Jaszkowo, Kuyavian-Pomeranian Voivodeship (north-central Poland)
