= Madre =

Madre means mother in many Romance languages, and it may also refer to:

- Madré, a commune in the Mayenne department of northwestern France
- Mądre, a village in the Greater Poland Voivodeship, in west-central Poland
- Isola Madre, an Italian island
- Tillandsia 'Madre'
- Jean de Madre (1862–1934), English polo player
- Madre (film), a 2016 Colombian short film
- Madre, a 2016 Chilean horror film written and directed by Aaron Burns
- Mother (2017 Spanish film), a Spanish short drama film directed by Rodrigo Sorogoyen
- Mother (2019 Spanish film), a Spanish-French drama film directed by Rodrigo Sorogoyen
- Madre (EP), a 2021 EP by Arca
- Madres, a 2021 American horror film
- Madres (album), a 2023 album by Sofia Kourtesis

== See also ==
- Sierra Madre (disambiguation)
