= Brodnica, Greater Poland Voivodeship =

Brodnica
- Village
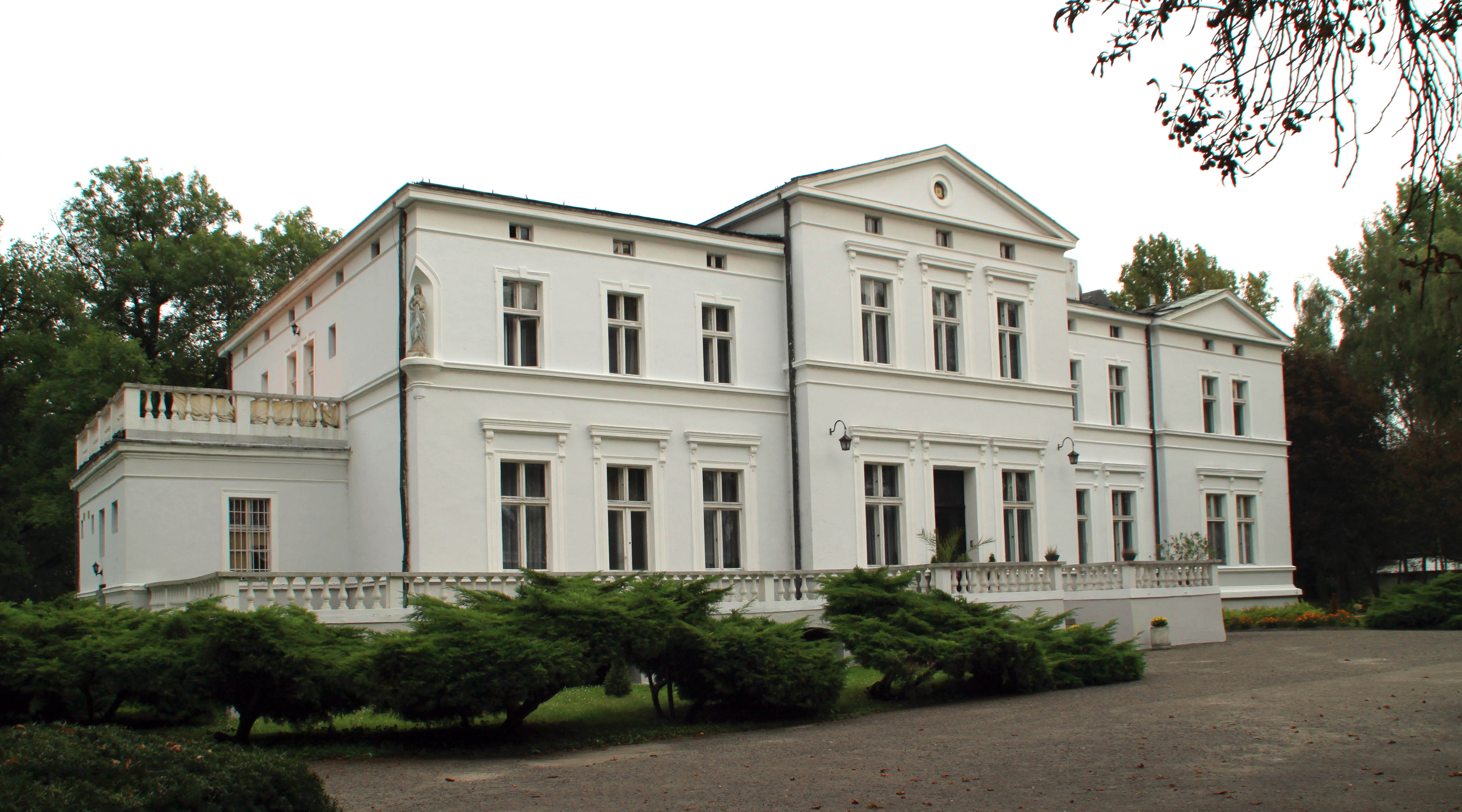
- Mańkowski Palace in Brodnica

- Location within Poland
- Coordinates: 52°8′N 16°54′E
- Country: Poland
- Voivodeship: Greater Poland
- County: Śrem
- Gmina: Brodnica
- Population: 722
- Time zone: UTC+1 (CET)
  - Summer (DST): UTC+2 (CEST)
- Vehicle registration: PSE
- Website: http://www.brodnica.net.pl

Brodnica [brɔdˈnit͡sa] is a village in Śrem County, Greater Poland Voivodeship, in west-central Poland. It is the seat of the gmina (administrative district) called Gmina Brodnica.

== History ==
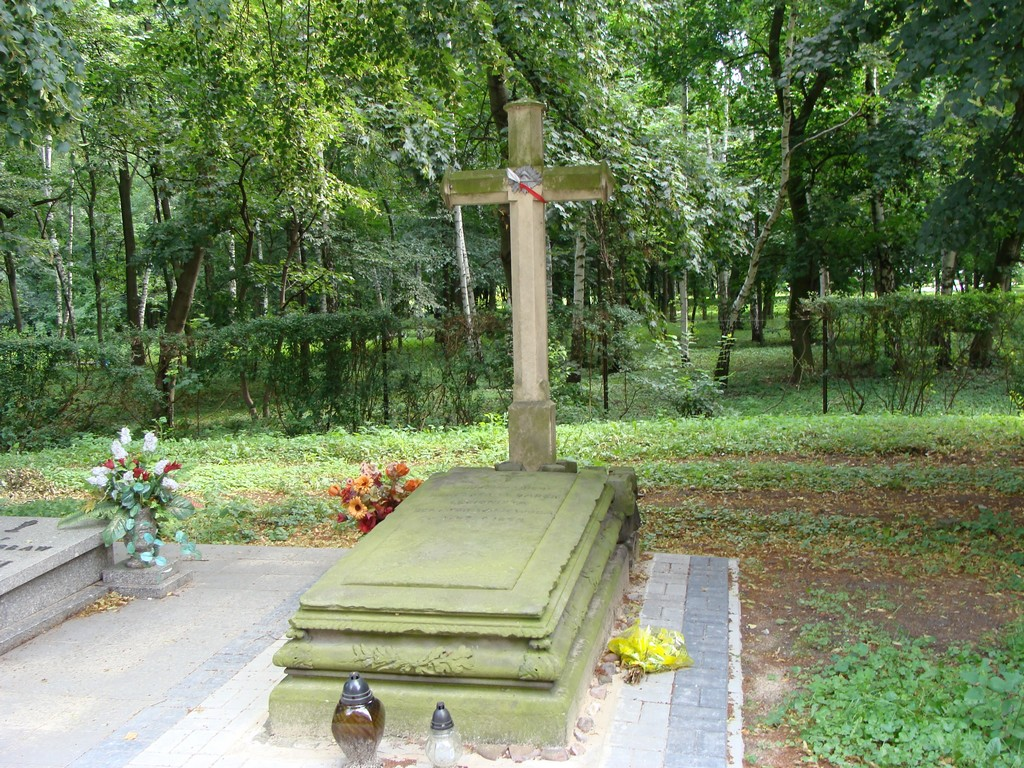
Old gravestone of Józef Wybicki

Brodnica was first mentioned in medieval documents in 1230, when it was part of fragmented Piast-ruled Poland. It was a private village of Polish nobility, administratively located in the Kościan County in the Poznań Voivodeship in the Greater Poland Province of the Polish Crown. It was the ancestral home of the Brodnicki family of Łodzia coat of arms.

Polish jurist, poet, political and military activist Józef Wybicki, best known as the author of the lyrics of the national anthem of Poland, was buried in the village before his remains were relocated to the Church of St. Adalbert in Poznań in the interbellum. Wybicki's old gravestone is preserved and his wife is still buried in Brodnica. Other landmarks of Brodnica are the Mańkowski Palace with the adjacent park and the Saint Catherine church.
