= Esterpole =

- Village
- Location within Poland
- Coordinates: 52°10′N 16°56′E
- Country: Poland
- Voivodeship: Greater Poland
- County: Śrem
- Gmina: Brodnica
- Population: 100

Esterpole [ɛstɛrˈpɔlɛ] is a village in the administrative district of Gmina Brodnica, within Śrem County, Greater Poland Voivodeship, in west-central Poland.

The name Esterpole originates from Jozef Wybicki’s wife, Estera Wierusz-Kowalska. Prior to the name change, the village was called Przylepskie Oręby.

From 1975 to 1998, Esterpole administratively belonged to Poznań Voivodeship.
