= Żurawiec =

Żurawiec may refer to the following places:

- Żurawiec, Śrem County in Greater Poland Voivodeship (west-central Poland)
- Żurawiec, Lublin Voivodeship (east Poland)
- Żurawiec, Warmian-Masurian Voivodeship (north Poland)
