= Iłówiec =

Iłówiec may refer to:

- Iłówiec, Greater Poland Voivodeship
- Iłowiec, Lublin Voivodeship
- Iłówiec, Masovian Voivodeship
- Iłowiec, West Pomeranian Voivodeship
