= Jewish Cemetery, Wrzeszcz =

Jewish cemetery in Poland

Coordinates: 54.3691°N 18.6251°E

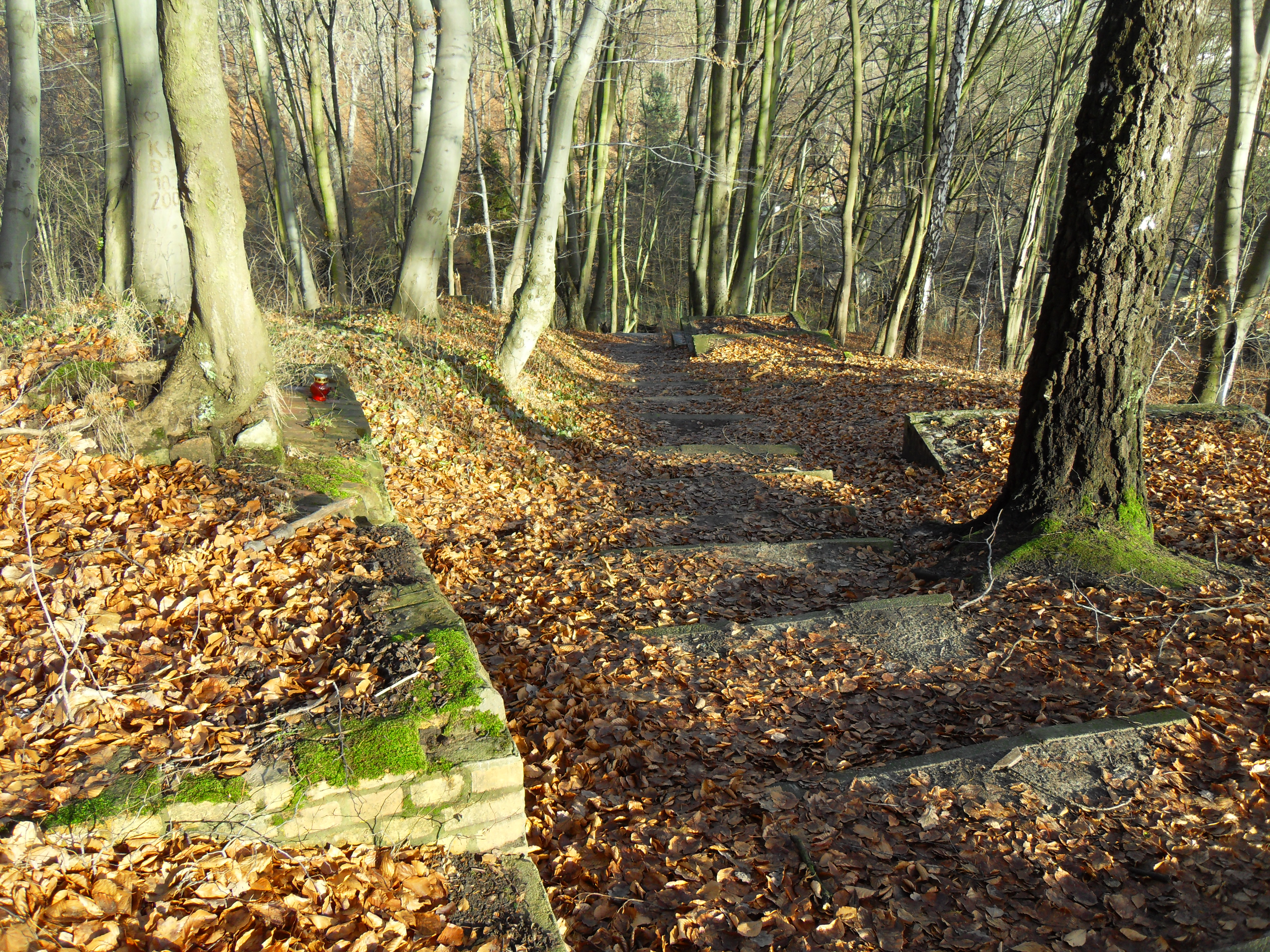
Jewish cemetery in Wrzeszcz

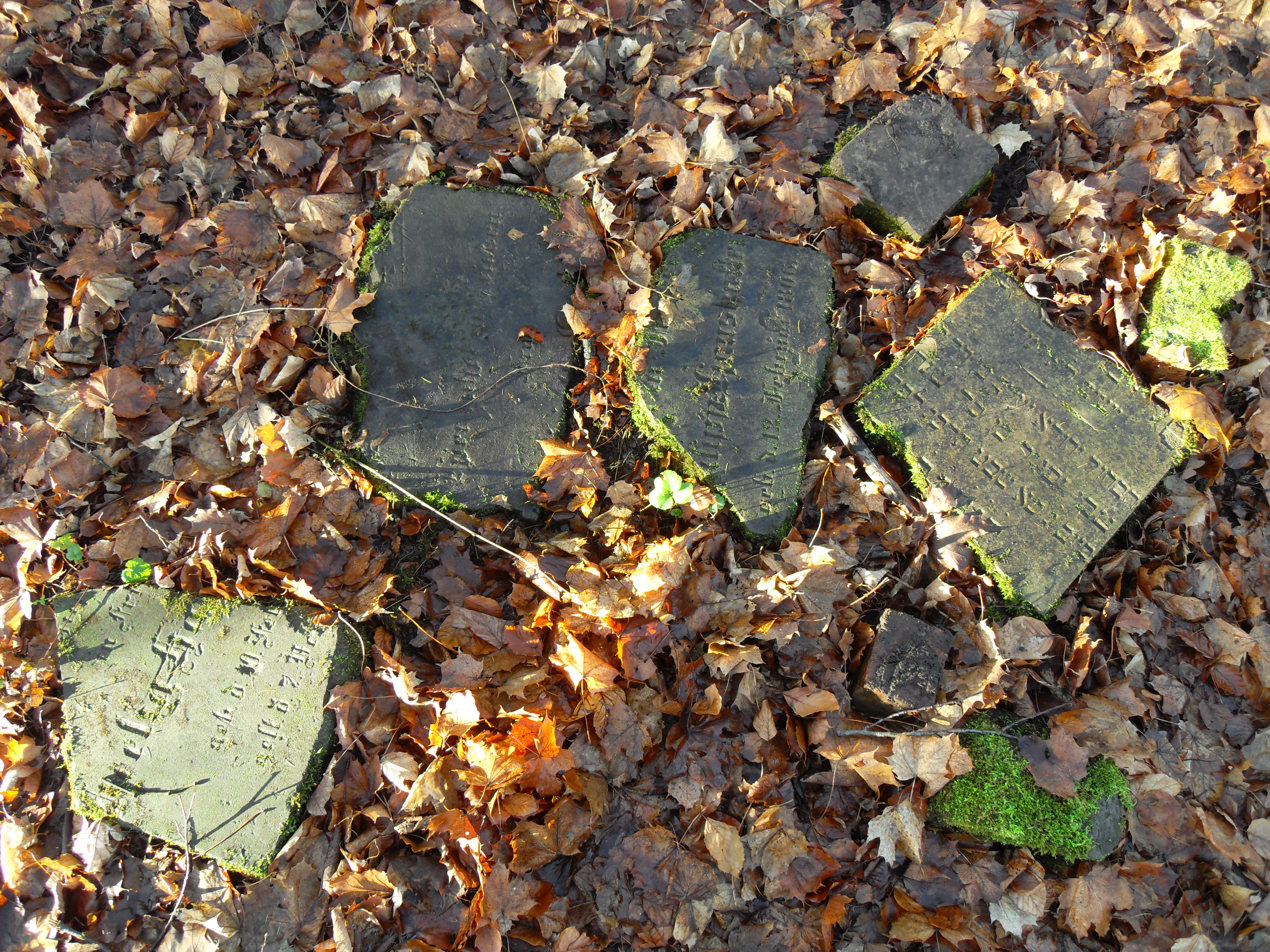
Fragments of tombstones

The Jewish Cemetery in Wrzeszcz, a borough of Gdańsk, Pomeranian Voivodeship, Poland, was established in the 18th century. The cemetery on the northern slope of Królewskie Wzgórze (King's hill) on Romualda Traugutta Street is now a publicly accessible park. It is not a protected heritage site.

== History ==
The first Jews settled in Wrzeszcz, outside the gates of the city of Gdańsk in the 1680s. By 1765, the Jewish quarter in the area had 230 inhabitants. The cemetery was established in the middle of the 18th century. Until 1775, it was administered by the chevra kadisha of the suburb of Stare Szkoty.

In 1775, administration of the cemetery was taken over by a newly established synagogue in the marketplace in Wrzeszcz, later known as the Old Synagogue. This synagogue remained in use until 1887, when the Great Synagogue was opened for all the Reform Jews in Gdańsk.

In 1814, during the Napoleonic Wars, the cemetery was largely destroyed and Wrzeszcz was incorporated into Gdańsk. The cemetery was re-established and restored to use in 1823.

Under pressure from the National Socialist government of the Free City of Danzig, the Jewish community decided to dissolve itself at the end of 1938. To finance the emigration of the members of the community, the 'Israelite cemetery' in Wrzeszcz was sold. The final burial took place in January. Since then, and especially after the official closure of the cemetery in 1942, the graves have fallen into disrepair. Today, the 0.35-hectare (0.86-acre) area contains only seven tombstones, the oldest of which dates from the year 1823.

For a long time it was rumoured that a stairway, called the 'Stairs of Shame' (Polish: schodami hańby), built on the hillside in the 1970s was made out of Jewish gravestones. In 2014, it was established that it is actually made of Christian tombstones.
