= Środa =

Środa is the Polish word for Wednesday. It appears in the names of Polish towns holding Wednesday weekly fairs.

There are two towns in Poland called Środa:

- Środa Śląska, in south-west Poland (Lower Silesian Voivodeship)
- Środa Wielkopolska, in west-central Poland (Greater Poland Voivodeship)

Środa is also a reservoir lake on the Maskawa River, near Środa Wielkopolska.
