= Polwica =

Polwica may refer to the following places in Poland:

- Polwica, Lower Silesian Voivodeship (south-west Poland)
- Polwica, Greater Poland Voivodeship (west-central Poland)
