= Gmina Zaniemyśl =

Gmina Zaniemyśl Zaniemyśl Commune
- Gmina
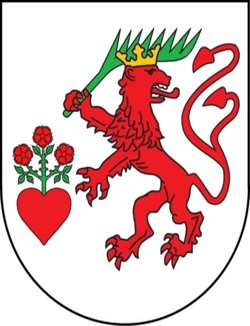
- Coat of arms
- Interactive map of Gmina Zaniemyśl
- Coordinates (Zaniemyśl): 52°9′25″N 17°10′38″E
- Country: Poland
- Voivodeship: Greater Poland
- County: Środa
- Seat: Zaniemyśl

Area
  - Total: 106.76 km^{2} (41.22 sq mi)

Population (2006)
  - Total: 6,191
  - Density: 57.99/km^{2} (150.2/sq mi)
- Website: http://www.zaniemysl.pl

Gmina Zaniemyśl is a rural gmina (administrative district) in Środa County, Greater Poland Voivodeship, in west-central Poland. Its seat is the village of Zaniemyśl, which lies approximately 12 kilometres (7 mi) south-west of Środa Wielkopolska and 33 km (21 mi) south-east of the regional capital Poznań.

The gmina covers an area of 106.76 square kilometres (41.2 sq mi), and as of 2006 its total population is 6,191.

== Villages ==
Gmina Zaniemyśl contains the villages and settlements of Bożydar, Brzostek, Czarnotki, Dębice, Dobroczyn Drugi, Dobroczyn Pierwszy, Doliwiec Leśny, Jaszkowo, Jeziorskie Huby, Jeziory Małe, Jeziory Wielkie, Józefowo, Kępa Mała, Kępa Wielka, Konstantynowo, Kowalka, Łękno, Luboniec, Lubonieczek, Ludwikowo, Mądre, Majdany, Pigłowice, Płaczki, Polesie, Polwica, Polwica-Huby, Potachy, Śnieciska, Winna, Wyszakowo, Wyszakowskie Huby, Zaniemyśl, Zofiówka and Zwola.

== Neighbouring gminas ==
Gmina Zaniemyśl is bordered by the gminas of Kórnik, Krzykosy, Książ Wielkopolski, Śrem and Środa Wielkopolska.
