= Tworzykowo =

- Settlement
- Location within Poland
- Coordinates: 52°10′N 16°58′E
- Country: Poland
- Voivodeship: Greater Poland
- County: Śrem
- Gmina: Brodnica

Tworzykowo [tfɔʐɨˈkɔvɔ] is a settlement in the administrative district of Gmina Brodnica, within Śrem County, Greater Poland Voivodeship, in west-central Poland.
