= Jeziorskie Huby =

- Village
- Location within Poland
- Coordinates: 52°10′52″N 17°09′44″E
- Country: Poland
- Voivodeship: Greater Poland
- County: Środa
- Gmina: Zaniemyśl

Jeziorskie Huby [jɛˈʑɔrskʲɛ ˈxubɨ] is a village in the administrative district of Gmina Zaniemyśl, within Środa County, Greater Poland Voivodeship, in west-central Poland.
