= Sofia Kourtesis =

Peruvian DJ (born 1985)

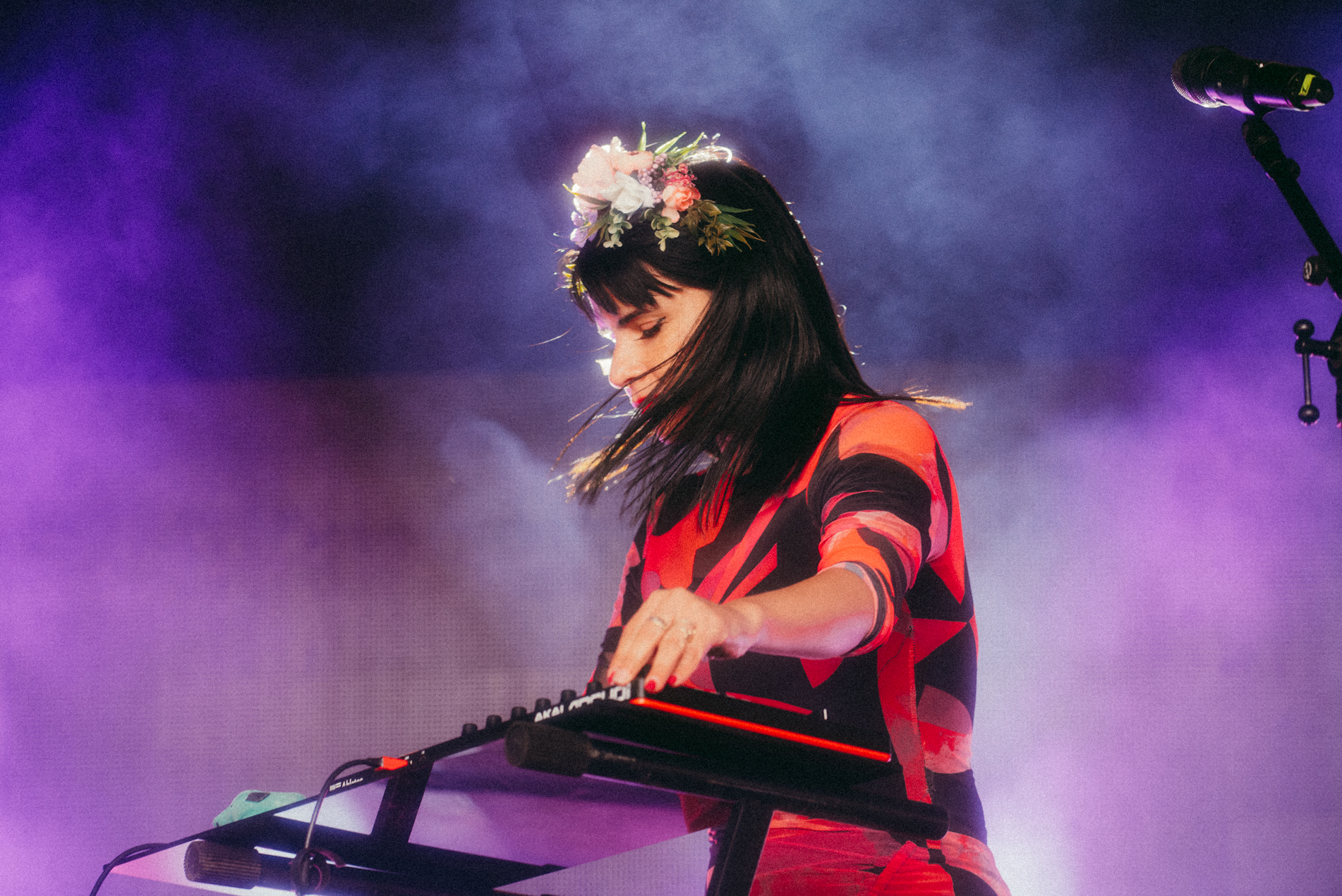
- Kourtesis performing at Glastonbury, 2022

Background information
- Born: 18 August 1985 (age 40); Magdalena, Lima, Peru
- Genres: House
- Occupations: DJ, music producer
- Years active: 2001–present
- Label: Ninja Tune
- Website: sofiakourtesis.com

Sofia Kourtesis (born 18 August 1985) is a Peruvian DJ and producer based in Berlin, Germany.

== History ==
She was born in Magdalena, Lima, Peru. Kourtesis released her debut EP, This Is It, in 2014. Kourtesis released her second, eponymous EP in 2019 and an EP of four songs in 2020 titled Sarita Colonia. This was followed by a five-song EP in 2021 called Fresia Magdalena.

Kourtesis released a single titled "Estación Esperanza" featuring Manu Chao in 2022 and the single "Madres" in 2023. Both of these songs were included on her debut album, Madres, released in October 2023 via the Ninja Tune label.

Kourtesis released her fifth EP, Volver, on August 1, 2025.

== Discography ==
=== Studio albums ===
List of studio albums, with selected details
Title	Album details
Madres	Released: 27 October 2023; Label: Ninja Tune

=== EPs ===
List of EPs, with selected details
Title	EP details
This Is It	Released: 28 November 2014; Label: Duchess Box
Sofia Kourtesis	Released: 28 February 2019; Label: Studio Barnhus
Sarita Colonia	Released: 14 February 2020; Label: Studio Barnhus
Fresia Magdalena	Released: 19 March 2021; Label: Technicolour
Volver	Released: 1 August 2025; Label: Ninja Tune
