= Kopyta, Greater Poland Voivodeship =

Kopyta
- Village
- Location within Poland
- Coordinates: 52°7′N 16°52′E
- Country: Poland
- Voivodeship: Greater Poland
- County: Śrem
- Gmina: Brodnica
- Population: 60

Kopyta [kɔˈpɨta] is a village in the administrative district of Gmina Brodnica, within Śrem County, Greater Poland Voivodeship, in west-central Poland. From 1975 to 1998, Kopyta administratively belonged to Poznań Voivodeship.
