= Manieczki =

- Village
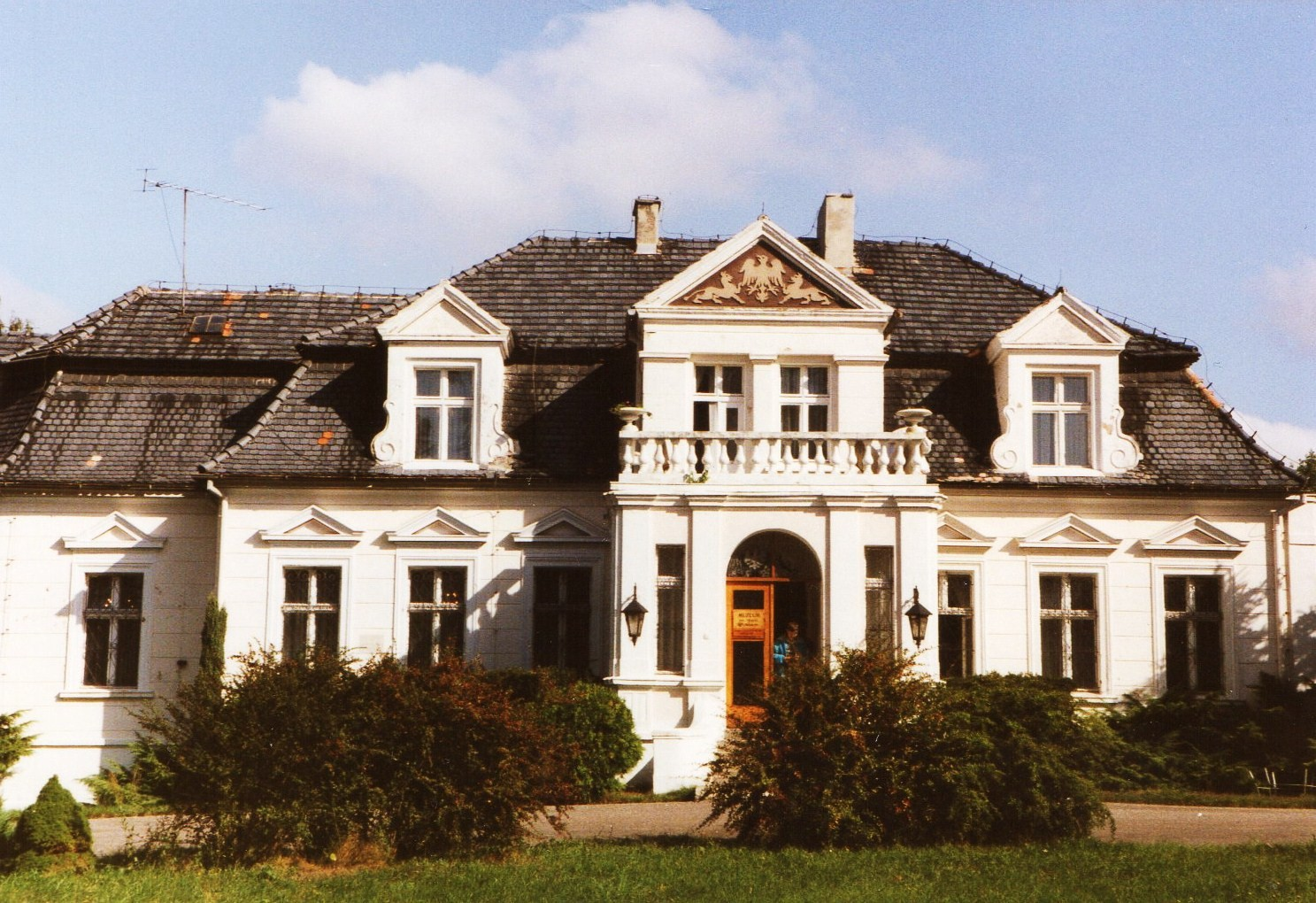
- Historic manor in Manieczki

- Location within Poland
- Coordinates: 52°7′N 16°56′E
- Country: Poland
- Voivodeship: Greater Poland
- County: Śrem
- Gmina: Brodnica
- Population: 1,100
- Time zone: UTC+1 (CET)
  - Summer (DST): UTC+2 (CEST)
- Vehicle registration: PSE

Manieczki [maˈɲɛt͡ʂki] is a village in the administrative district of Gmina Brodnica, within Śrem County, Greater Poland Voivodeship, in west-central Poland.

== History ==
Manieczki was first mentioned in 1368. It was a private village of Polish nobility, administratively located in the Kościan County in the Poznań Voivodeship in the Greater Poland Province of the Kingdom of Poland. Manieczki was divided into Manieczki, Gabrianowski, Chaławski, Przylepski, that is, to the local nobility. On 21 June 1781 the property was sold to Józef Wybicki. Many of his literary works were written in Manieczki, and he died in 1822 in a wooden manor, which no longer exists.

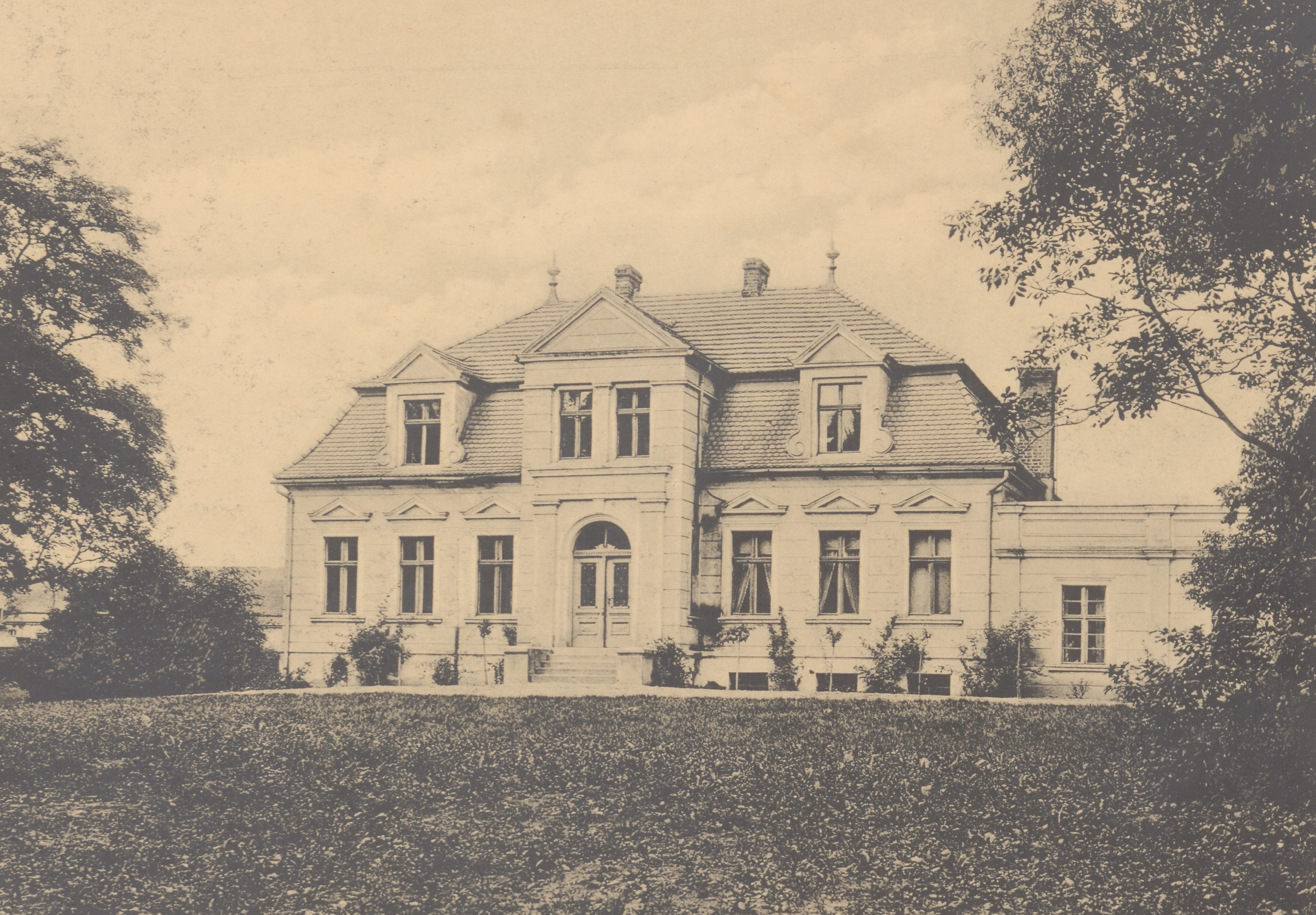
Manor house in 1912

In 1857 Antoni Białecki discovered an old pagan cemetery in Manieczki, from which 180 items were granted to the Poznań Society of Friends of Learning.

In July 1960, the first state-owned farm complex in Poland was built - Kombinat Państwowych Gospodartswa Manieczki. In 1993, it transformed into the Manieczki State Treasury Farm, and in 1994, the name changed again to Kombinat Rolno-Przemysłowy “Manieczki” Sp. z o.o.

From 1975 to 1998, Manieczki administratively belonged to Poznań Voivodeship.

== Sights ==
The historic sights of the village are the Chapel of the Nativity of the Virgin Mary, funded by Józef Wybicki, the historic manor house and an 18th-century park. On the road to Krzyżanów, there is a mound topped with a pillar with a statue of the Virgin Mary. According to tradition, it hides the ashes of the insurgents from 1848 and 1863.

== Notable residents ==
Józef Wybicki (1747-1822), jurist, poet, political and military activist best known for being the author of the lyrics of the Polish National Anthem
