= Gmina Brodnica, Greater Poland Voivodeship =

Gmina Brodnica Brodnica Commune
- Gmina
- Coat of arms
- Interactive map of Gmina Brodnica
- Coordinates (Brodnica): 52°8′N 16°54′E
- Country: Poland
- Voivodeship: Greater Poland
- County: Śrem
- Seat: Brodnica

Area
  - Total: 95.86 km^{2} (37.01 sq mi)

Population (2006)
  - Total: 4,644
  - Density: 48.45/km^{2} (125.5/sq mi)
- Website: http://www.brodnica.net.pl/

Gmina Brodnica is a rural gmina (administrative district) in Śrem County, Greater Poland Voivodeship, in west-central [Poland. Its seat is the village of Brodnica, which lies approximately 10 kilometres (6 mi) north-west of Śrem and 30 km (19 mi) south of the regional capital Poznań.

The gmina covers an area of 95.86 square kilometres (37.0 sq mi), and as of 2006 its total population is 4,644.

== Villages ==
Gmina Brodnica contains the villages and settlements of Boreczek, Brodnica, Brodniczka, Chaławy, Esterpole, Górka, Grabianowo, Grzybno, Iłówiec, Iłówiec Wielki, Jaszkowo, Kopyta, Ludwikowo, Manieczki, Ogieniowo, Piotrowo, Przylepki, Rogaczewo, Sucharzewo, Sulejewo, Szołdry, Tworzykowo, Żabno and Żurawiec.

== Neighbouring gminas ==
Gmina Brodnica is bordered by the gminas of Czempiń, Mosina and Śrem.
