= Ogieniowo =

- Village
- Location within Poland
- Coordinates: 52°9′N 16°49′E
- Country: Poland
- Voivodeship: Greater Poland
- County: Śrem
- Gmina: Brodnica

Ogieniowo, known until 2012 as Ogieniewo [ɔɡʲɛˈɲɔvɔ] is a village in the administrative district of Gmina Brodnica, within Śrem County, Greater Poland Voivodeship, in west-central Poland. From 1975 to 1998, Ogieniowo administratively belonged to Poznań Voivodeship. It's a typical small settlement of rural Poland lying by the countryside village Brodnica, which is northwest of the town Srem, and south of the regional capital, Poznan.
