= Zaniemyśl =

- Town
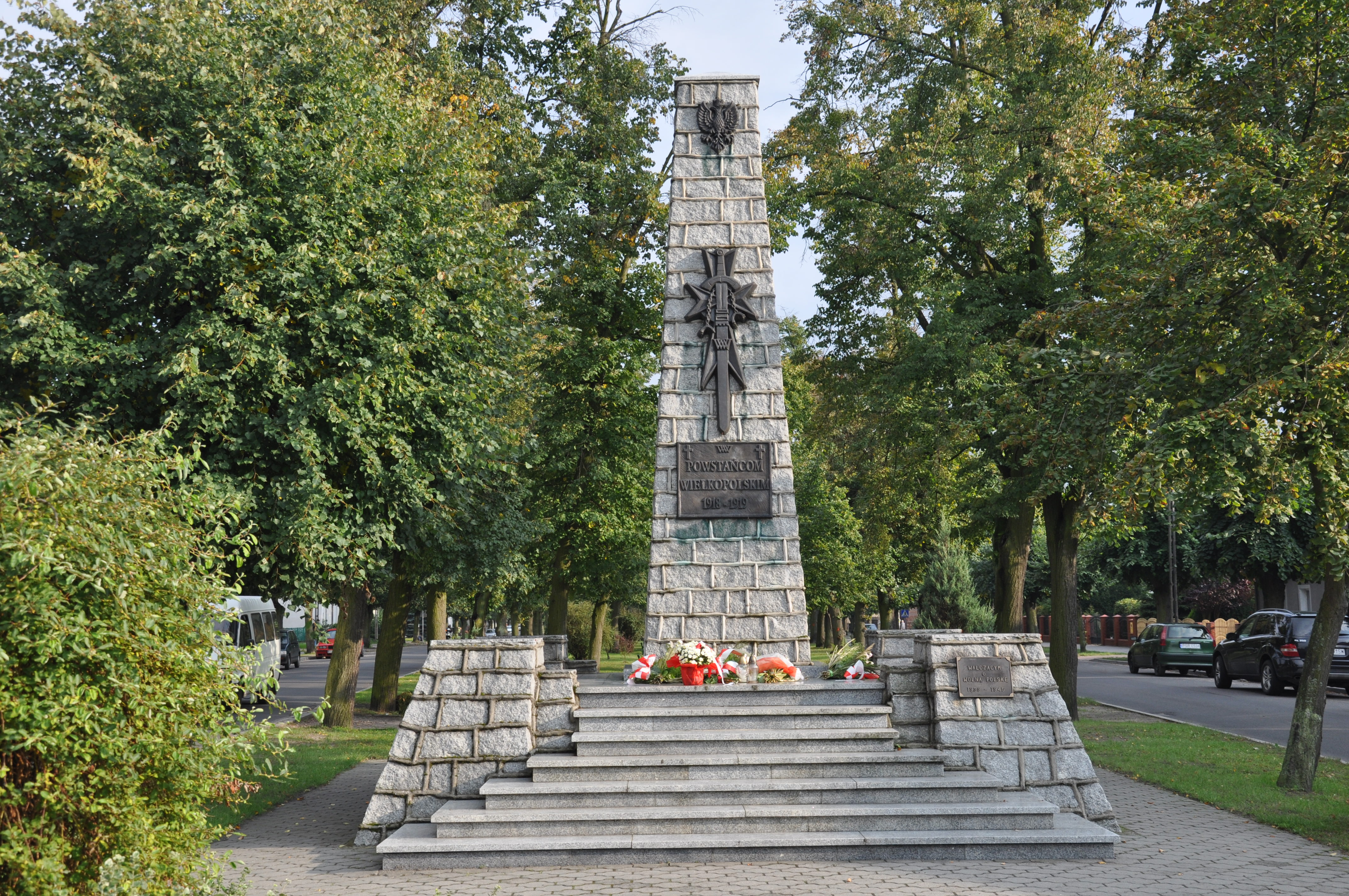
- Monument to the insurgents of the Greater Poland Uprising

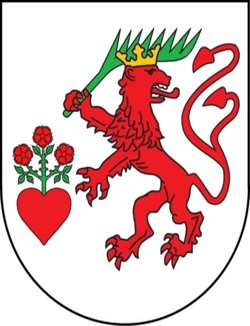
- Coat of arms

- Location within Poland
- Coordinates: 52°9′N 17°10′E
- Country: Poland
- Voivodeship: Greater Poland
- County: Środa
- Gmina: Zaniemyśl
- Town rights: 1742
- Elevation: 70 m (230 ft)

Population
  - Total: 2,200
- Time zone: UTC+1 (CET)
  - Summer (DST): UTC+2 (CEST)
- Vehicle registration: PSR
- Website: http://www.zaniemysl.pl/

Zaniemyśl [zaˈɲɛmɨɕl] is a town in Środa County, Greater Poland Voivodeship, in west-central Poland. It is the seat of the gmina (administrative district) called Gmina Zaniemyśl.

Zaniemyśl lies next to a series of lakes, making it a popular tourist destination. There is also a steam railway running between Zaniemyśl and Środa Wielkopolska. This is the oldest steam railway in Poland.

== History ==
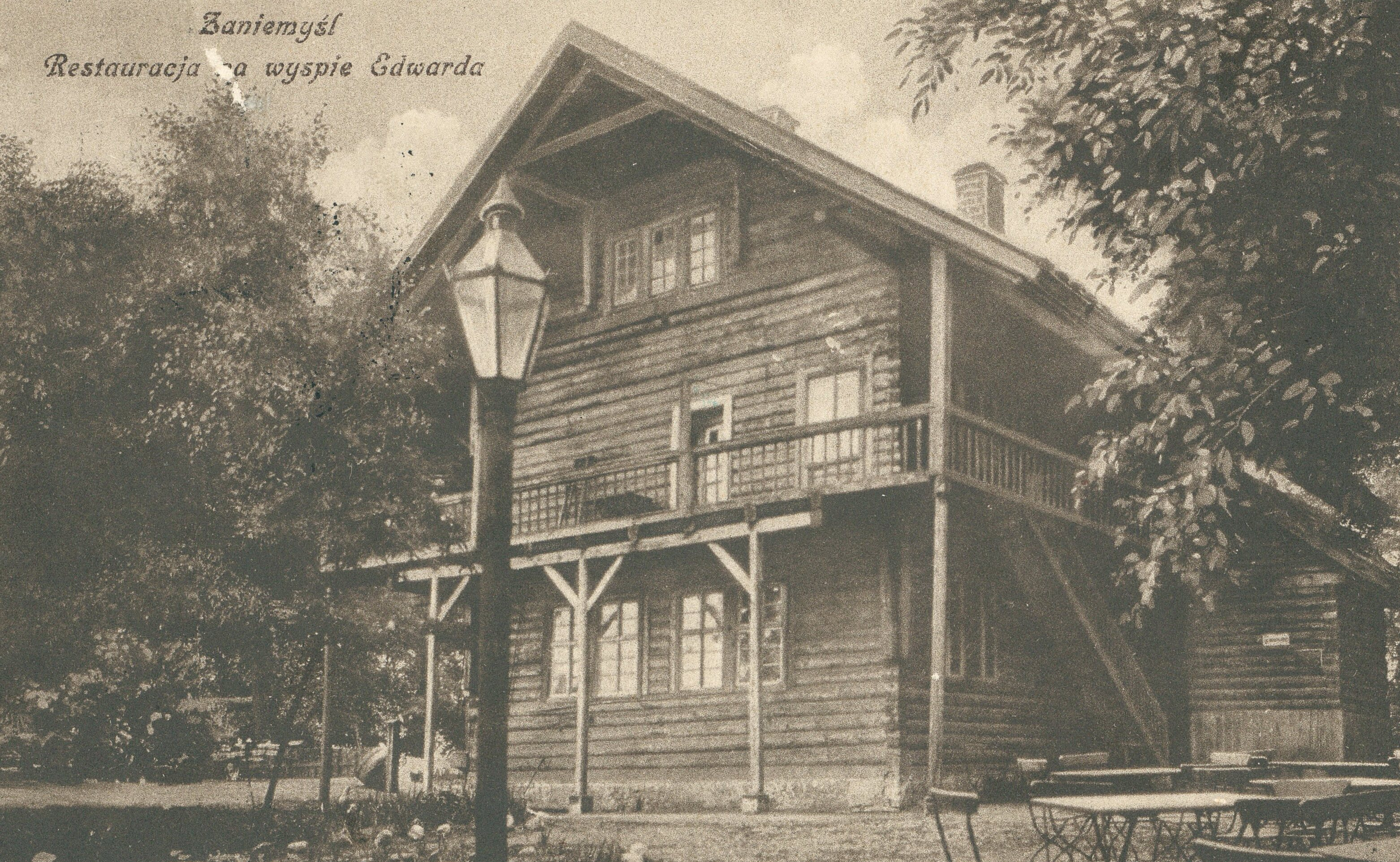
Restaurant on Edward Island in 1930

Niezamyśl was a private village of Polish nobility, administratively located in the Pyzdry County in the Kalisz Voivodeship in the Greater Poland Province of the Kingdom of Poland. In 1331, during the Polish–Teutonic War of 1326–1332, it was the site a battle between the Poles and the invading Teutonic Knights, won by the Poles. In 1742, it was granted town rights and renamed Zaniemyśl. It was a private town, owned by the Poniński and Jaraczewski families.

During the German occupation of Poland (World War II), several Poles from Zaniemyśl, including landowners, teachers and a school principal, were among the victims of a public execution of Poles, perpetrated by the occupiers in nearby Środa Wielkopolska on October 20, 1939. In 1940, the German police and gendarmerie carried out expulsions of Poles, whose houses and farms were handed over to German colonists as part of the Lebensraum policy. The Poles were either deported to the General Government in the more-eastern part of German-occupied Poland, or enslaved as forced labour in the region or deported to Germany.

The Polish resistance movement was active in Zaniemyśl, including local units of the Wielkopolska Organizacja Wojskowa, Wojskowa Organizacja Ziem Zachodnich and Home Army. Bogdan Wysocki, organizer of the unit of the Wielkopolska Organizacja Wojskowa, was arrested by the Gestapo in 1940, then held in various prisons, sentenced to death in Zwickau and executed in Dresden in 1942, whereas Zbigniew Leonard Kasztelan, leader of the local unit of the Home Army, was arrested by the Gestapo in April 1944, and then imprisoned, tortured, sentenced to death and executed in Żabikowo in 1945.

== Demographics ==
Historical population

Year	Pop.	±%
1843	1,409	—
1871	1,313	−6.8%
1880	1,364	+3.9%
1890	1,301	−4.6%

Year	Pop.	±%
1900	1,253	−3.7%
1910	1,426	+13.8%
1921	1,291	−9.5%
1931	1,335	+3.4%

== Transport ==
Zaniemśyl lies on voivodeship road 432.
