= Grzybno, Greater Poland Voivodeship =

Grzybno
- Village
- Location within Poland
- Coordinates: 52°11′N 16°51′E
- Country: Poland
- Voivodeship: Greater Poland
- County: Śrem
- Gmina: Brodnica
- Population: 300

Grzybno [ˈɡʐɨbnɔ] is a village in the administrative district of Gmina Brodnica, within Śrem County, Greater Poland Voivodeship, in west-central Poland.

== History ==
Grzybno was first mentioned in 1387, also mentioning Tomisław of Grzybno.

From 1874 to 1944, Grzybno was German territory.

From 1975 to 1998, Grzybno administratively belonged to Poznań Voivodeship.
