= Żabno, Greater Poland Voivodeship =

Żabno
- Village
- Location within Poland
- Coordinates: 52°11′N 16°53′E
- Country: Poland
- Voivodeship: Greater Poland
- County: Śrem
- Gmina: Brodnica

Żabno [ˈʐabnɔ] is a village in the administrative district of Gmina Brodnica, within Śrem County, Greater Poland Voivodeship, in west-central Poland.
