= Józefowo, Gmina Zaniemyśl =

Józefowo
- Settlement
- Location within Poland
- Coordinates: 52°6′N 17°11′E
- Country: Poland
- Voivodeship: Greater Poland
- County: Środa
- Gmina: Zaniemyśl
- Elevation: 80 m (260 ft)

Józefowo (Polish pronunciation: [juzɛˈfɔvɔ]) is a settlement in the administrative district of Gmina Zaniemyśl, within Środa County, Greater Poland Voivodeship, in west-central Poland.
