= Piotrowo, Śrem County =

Piotrowo
- Village
- Location within Poland
- Coordinates: 52°8′N 16°52′E
- Country: Poland
- Voivodeship: Greater Poland
- County: Śrem
- Gmina: Brodnica

Piotrowo [pjɔˈtrɔvɔ] is a village in the administrative district of Gmina Brodnica, within Śrem County, Greater Poland Voivodeship, in west-central Poland.

== History ==
Piotrowo was first mentioned in documents in 1396. At that time, Piotrowo was owned by Przybysław Piotrowski and Grzymka Piotrowska. From 1975 to 1998, Piotrowo administratively belonged to Poznań Voivodeship.
