= Monika Buczkowska =

Polish operatic soprano (born 1992)

- Born: 5 November 1992 (age 33); Środa Wielkopolska, Poland
- Education: Poznań Music Academy
- Occupation: Operatic soprano
- Organizations: Oper Frankfurt
- Website: monikabuczkowska.com

Monika Buczkowska (born 5 November 1992) is a Polish operatic soprano, based in Germany at the Oper Frankfurt. Her repertoire, ranging from Baroque opera to contemporary music, includes especially Mozart roles such as Susanna and Pamina.

== Career ==
Born in Środa Wielkopolska, Buczkowska studied at the Music Academy in Poznań with Barbara Mądra-Bednarek, graduating in 2016. In May 2016, she appeared at the Grand Theatre in Poznań in a student project, as Susanna in Mozart's Le nozze di Figaro, conducted by Przemysław Neumann.

She won first prize at the Polish Vocal Festival Maria Stankowa in Olsztyn and the Marta Eggerth & Jan Kiepura Prize of the Moniuszko Vocal Competition. She was a member of the Opera Academy of the Teatr Wielki in Warsaw, where she was coached by Eytan Pessen, Matthias Rexroth and Izabela Kłosińska.

She made her debut in Germany at the Oper Frankfurt in 2019, as Lydie in Fauré's Pénélope, and joined the ensemble the following season. She performed there the soprano solo in a staged performance of Pergolesi's Stabat Mater. She appeared at the Tyrol Festival in Erl, Austria, as Freia in Wagner's Das Rheingold and as Madeleine in Adam's Le postillon de Lonjumeau. Her Mozart roles include both Zerlina and Donna Anna in his Don Giovanni, and both Papagena and Pamina in Die Zauberflöte, Papagena in a production directed by Barrie Kosky. She appeared as Donna Anna first at a music festival in Nieborów, and performed as Eurydike in Offenbach's Orpheus in the Underworld with the Baltic State Opera in Gdańsk. She took part in a new production of Prokofiev's The Fiery Angel at the Teatr Wielki in Warsaw in a co-production with the Aix-en-Provence Festival, conducted by Kazushi Ōno. She performed the soprano solo in Penderecki's Credo in Nagoya.

On 10 March 2022, she was the soprano soloist in the final of Beethoven's Ninth Symphony in a charity concert at the Alte Oper of Frankfurt performers for Ukraine, with the hr-Sinfonieorchester conducted by Juraj Valčuha.
