= Rogaczewo, Śrem County =

Rogaczewo
- Village
- Location within Poland
- Coordinates: 52°09′00″N 16°51′00″E
- Country: Poland
- Voivodeship: Greater Poland
- County: Śrem
- Gmina: Brodnica

Rogaczewo [rɔɡaˈt͡ʂɛvɔ] is a village in the administrative district of Gmina Brodnica, within Śrem County, Greater Poland Voivodeship, in west-central Poland.
