= Brodniczka, Greater Poland Voivodeship =

Brodniczka
- Village
- Location within Poland
- Coordinates: 52°10′N 16°55′E
- Country: Poland
- Voivodeship: Greater Poland
- County: Śrem
- Gmina: Brodnica
- Population: 60

Brodniczka [brɔdˈnit͡ʂka] is a village in the administrative district of Gmina Brodnica, within Śrem County, Greater Poland Voivodeship, in west-central Poland.
