= Będomin =

- Village
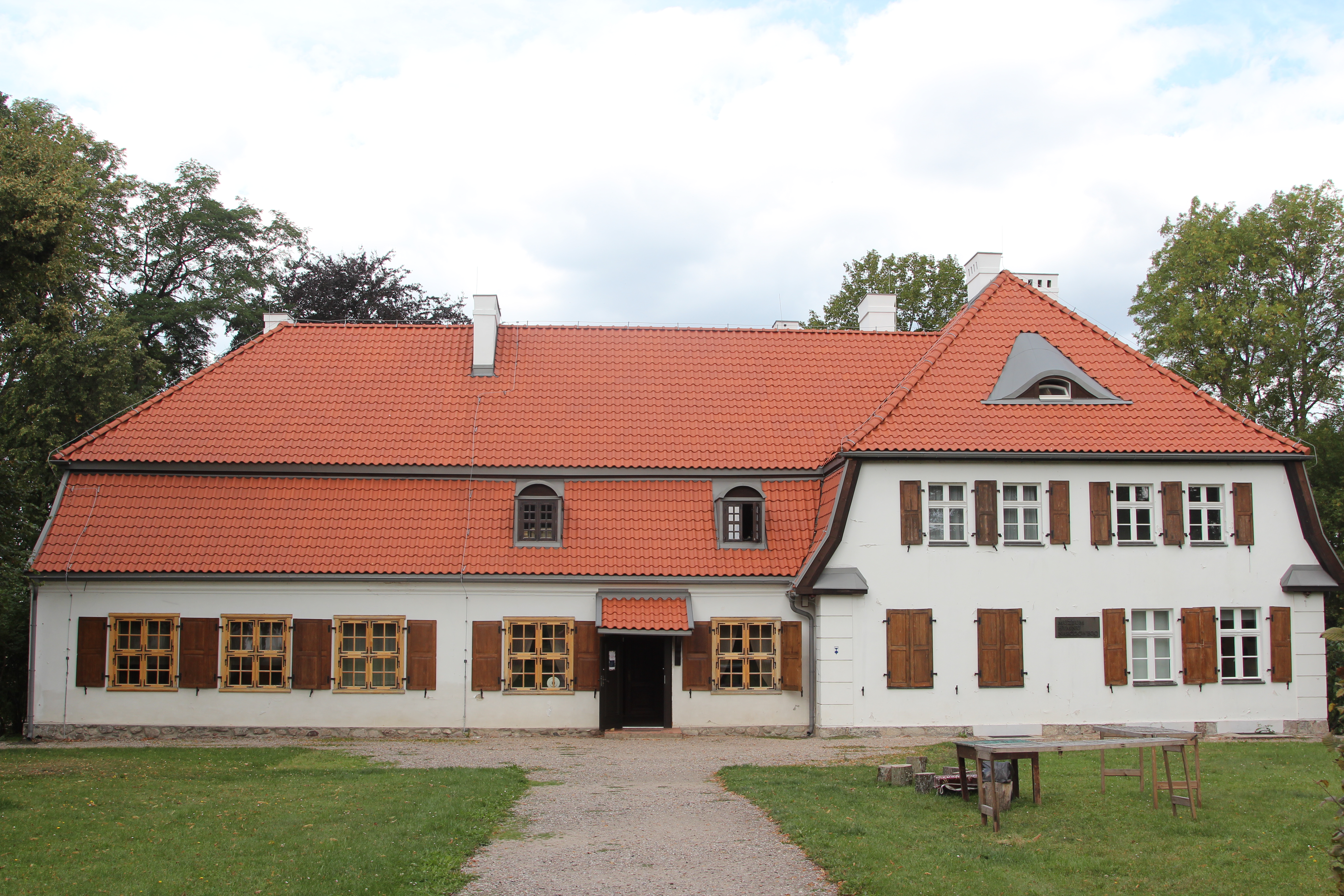
- Manor house of Józef Wybicki, currently the Museum of Polish Anthem

- Location within Poland
- Coordinates: 54°7′40″N 18°7′22″E
- Country: Poland
- Voivodeship: Pomeranian
- County: Kościerzyna
- Gmina: Nowa Karczma

Population
  - Total: 212
- Time zone: UTC+1 (CET)
  - Summer (DST): UTC+2 (CEST)
- Postal code: 83-422
- Vehicle registration: GKS

Będomin [bɛnˈdɔmin] is a village in the administrative district of Gmina Nowa Karczma, within Kościerzyna County, Pomeranian Voivodeship, in northern Poland. It is located in the ethnocultural region of Kashubia in the historic region of Pomerania.

The local landmark is the former manor house of Józef Wybicki, currently the Museum of Polish Anthem.

== Notable people ==
- Józef Wybicki (1747–1822) a Polish jurist, poet, political and military activist, best remembered as the author of "Mazurek Dąbrowskiego" which was adopted as the Polish national anthem in 1927
