= Kijewo, Greater Poland Voivodeship =

Kijewo
- Village
- Location within Poland
- Coordinates: 52°12′N 17°17′E
- Country: Poland
- Voivodeship: Greater Poland
- County: Środa
- Gmina: Środa Wielkopolska
- Population: 330
- Time zone: UTC+1 (CET)
  - Summer (DST): UTC+2 (CEST)

Kijewo [kiˈjɛvɔ] is a village in the administrative district of Gmina Środa Wielkopolska, within Środa County, Greater Poland Voivodeship, in west-central Poland.

During the German occupation of Poland (World War II), on September 17, 1939, the Gestapo murdered 21 Poles from the neighbouring town of Środa Wielkopolska in the village.

In 2017 and 2018 parts of the village were included within the town limits of Środa Wielkopolska.

== Notable people ==
- Alfred Milewski (born 1935), Polish military officer, who fought in the Greater Poland uprising (1918–19), Polish–Soviet War and World War II
