= Górka, Śrem County =

Górka
- Village
- Location within Poland
- Coordinates: 52°8′N 16°55′E
- Country: Poland
- Voivodeship: Greater Poland
- County: Śrem
- Gmina: Brodnica
- Population: 260

Górka [ˈɡurka] is a village in the administrative district of Gmina Brodnica, within Śrem County, Greater Poland Voivodeship, in west-central Poland.

== History ==
The first known written records of the village come from 1321. During the 1420s, Dobrogost of Dzwonowo was the owner of Górka.

Górka used to be a clergy village, as property of the chapter of the Poznań Cathedral. By the 1700s, Górka was located in the Kościan District, within the Poznań Voivodeship, Poland-Lithuania.
