= Sulejewo, Śrem County =

Sulejewo
- Village
- Location within Poland
- Coordinates: 52°9′N 16°54′E
- Country: Poland
- Voivodeship: Greater Poland
- County: Śrem
- Gmina: Brodnica
- Population: 150

Sulejewo [sulɛˈjɛvɔ] is a village in the administrative district of Gmina Brodnica, within Śrem County, Greater Poland Voivodeship, in west-central Poland.
