= Kowalka =

- Settlement
- Location within Poland
- Coordinates: 52°9′N 17°9′E
- Country: Poland
- Voivodeship: Greater Poland
- County: Środa
- Gmina: Zaniemyśl
- Elevation: 70 m (230 ft)

Kowalka [kɔˈvalka] is a settlement in the administrative district of Gmina Zaniemyśl, within Środa County, Greater Poland Voivodeship, in west-central Poland.
