= Polwica-Huby =

- Village
- Location within Poland
- Coordinates: 52°11′02″N 17°10′09″E
- Country: Poland
- Voivodeship: Greater Poland
- County: Środa
- Gmina: Zaniemyśl
- Elevation: 90 m (300 ft)
- Population: 18

Polwica-Huby [pɔlˈvit͡sa ˈxubɨ] is a village in the administrative district of Gmina Zaniemyśl, in Środa County, Greater Poland Voivodeship, in west-central Poland.
