= Dębice, Greater Poland Voivodeship =

Dębice
- Village
- Location within Poland
- Coordinates: 52°7′N 17°11′E
- Country: Poland
- Voivodeship: Greater Poland
- County: Środa
- Gmina: Zaniemyśl
- Elevation: 70 m (230 ft)

Dębice [dɛmˈbit͡sɛ] is a village in the administrative district of Gmina Zaniemyśl, within Środa County, Greater Poland Voivodeship, in west-central Poland.
