= Boreczek, Greater Poland Voivodeship =

Boreczek
- Village
- Location within Poland
- Coordinates: 52°8′N 16°57′E
- Country: Poland
- Voivodeship: Greater Poland
- County: Śrem
- Gmina: Brodnica

Boreczek ([bɔˈrɛt͡ʂɛk]; German: Vorwerk Boreczek, 1943–45 Wäldchen) is a village in the administrative district of Gmina Brodnica, within Śrem County, Greater Poland Voivodeship, in west-central Poland.
