= Zofiówka, Greater Poland Voivodeship =

Zofiówka
- Village
- Location within Poland
- Coordinates: 52°09′23″N 17°06′37″E
- Country: Poland
- Voivodeship: Greater Poland
- County: Środa
- Gmina: Zaniemyśl

Zofiówka [zɔˈfjufka] is a village in the administrative district of Gmina Zaniemyśl, within Środa County, Greater Poland Voivodeship, in west-central Poland.
