= Płaczki, Greater Poland Voivodeship =

Płaczki
- Village
- Location within Poland
- Coordinates: 52°12′N 17°13′E
- Country: Poland
- Voivodeship: Greater Poland
- County: Środa
- Gmina: Zaniemyśl
- Elevation: 80 m (260 ft)
- Population: 70

Płaczki [ˈpwat͡ʂki] is a village in the administrative district of Gmina Zaniemyśl, within Środa County, Greater Poland Voivodeship, in west-central Poland.
