= Królewskie Wzgórze =

Hill in Gdańsk, Poland

- Królewska Góra; Königshöhe; Ślimak; Sobótka
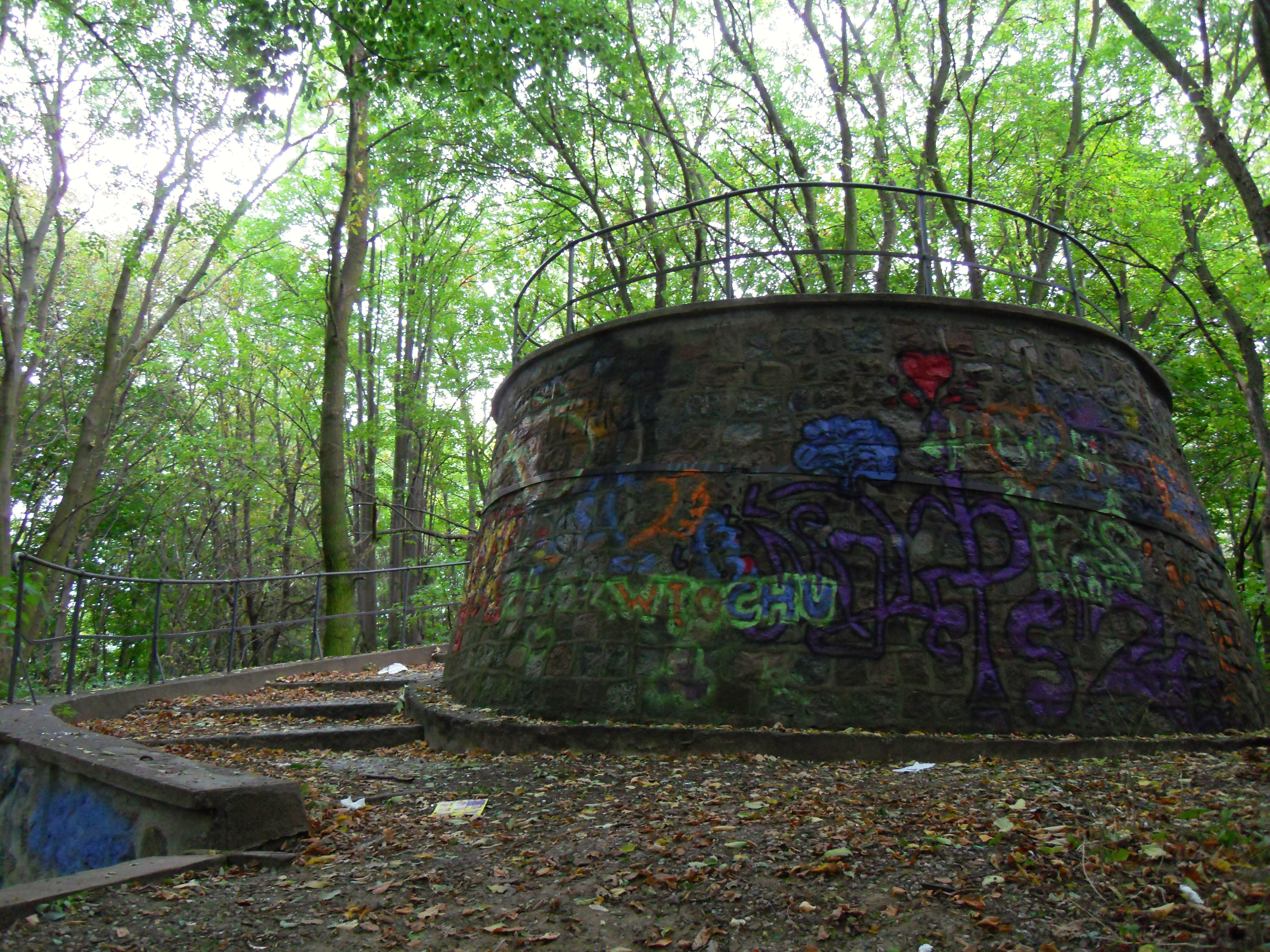
- The former lookout-post on the hill

Highest point
- Elevation: 99.2 m (325 ft)
- Coordinates: 54°22′9.48″N 18°36′12.58″E

Geography
- Location within Pomeranian Voivodeship Location within Poland
- Location: Gdańsk, Pomeranian Voivodeship, Poland

The Królewskie Wzgórze ('Royal hill'), known before 1945 as Królewska Góra in Polish and Königshöhe in German and now also known as Ślimak (Slug) and Sobótka (bonfire), is a 99.2-metre-high (325 ft) hill in Gdańsk in Poland. It is located in the suburb of Wrzeszcz and was originally named after Frederick William III of Prussia (1770-1840).

There is a clear view over Gdańsk from the hill. The former lookout tower on the summit was very badly damaged in 1945 and is now in ruins. The top of the hill was fortified around the middle of the 19th century; it was linked with Jäschkental Park. Until 1945, red beech trees formed the letters of the word 'Danzig'. There was a toboggan-run on the site until the 1970s.

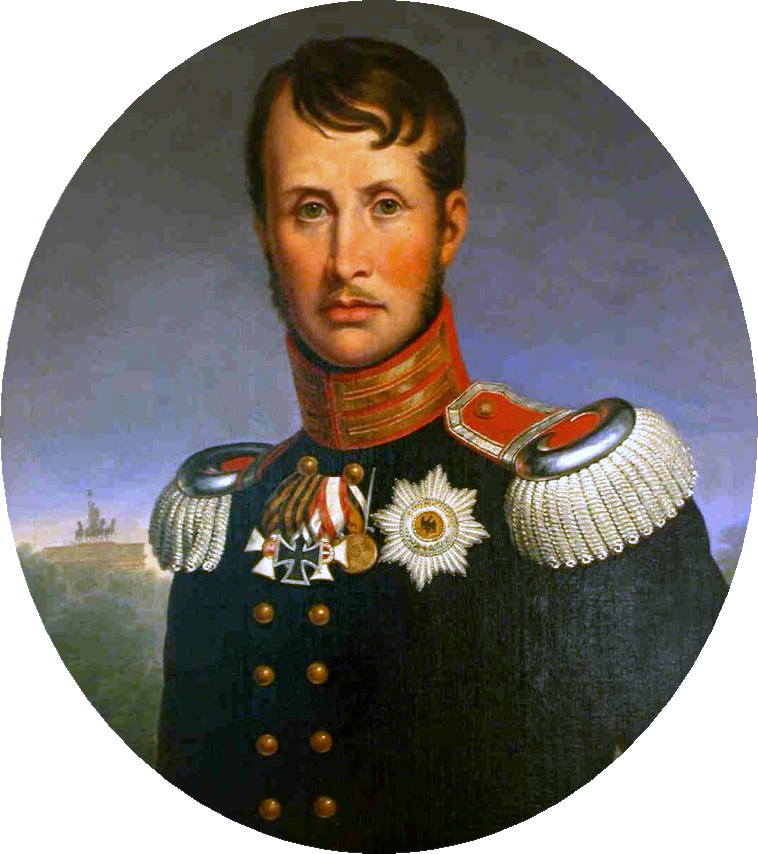
The hill's namesake, Frederick William III

On the north slope, there is the former Jewish Cemetery of Wrzeszcz, which was sold in 1938. It is located on Romualda Traugatta Street and is now a public park and not a recognised heritage site.

In 1925, the 'Danzig Charitable House-building Co-operative Homes" association built a neighbourhood of forty houses on the hill, some intended for one and some for four families. In 2006, six hectares were used to build the new neighbourhood of Królewskie Wzgórze, consisting of 21 buildings intended to house a total of 680 families.
