= Iłówiec Wielki =

- Village
- Location within Poland
- Coordinates: 52°9′N 16°48′E
- Country: Poland
- Voivodeship: Greater Poland
- County: Śrem
- Gmina: Brodnica
- Population: 80

Iłówiec Wielki (Polish pronunciation: [iˈwuvjɛts ˈfjɛlkʲi]) is a village in the administrative district of Gmina Brodnica, in Śrem County, Greater Poland Voivodeship, in west-central Poland. From 1975 to 1998, Iłówiec Wielki administratively belonged to Poznań Voivodeship.

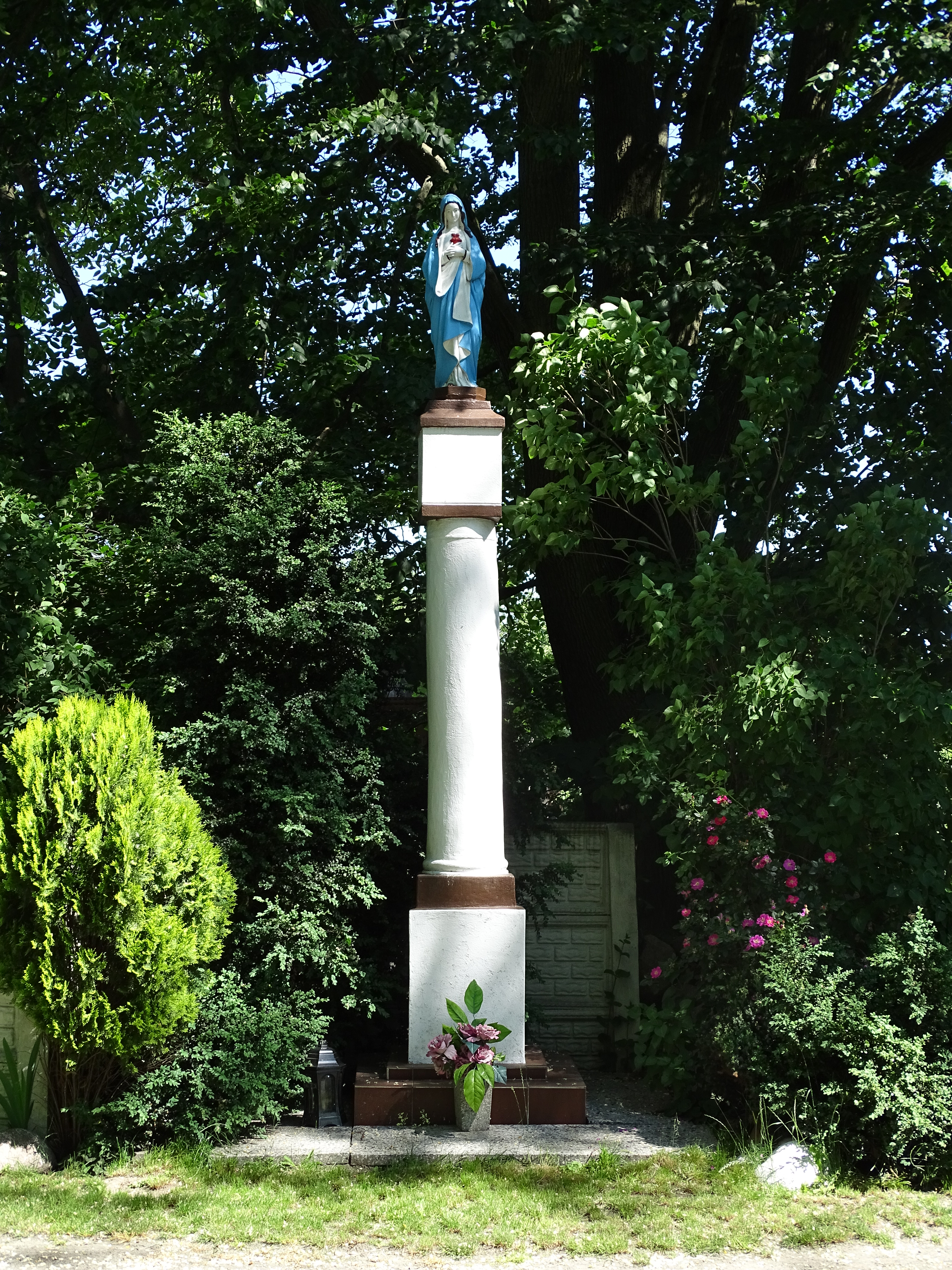
The roadshine shrine.
