= Jaszkowo, Śrem County =

Jaszkowo
- Village
- Location within Poland
- Coordinates: 52°9′N 16°58′E
- Country: Poland
- Voivodeship: Greater Poland
- County: Śrem
- Gmina: Brodnica
- Elevation: 70 m (230 ft)
- Population: 200

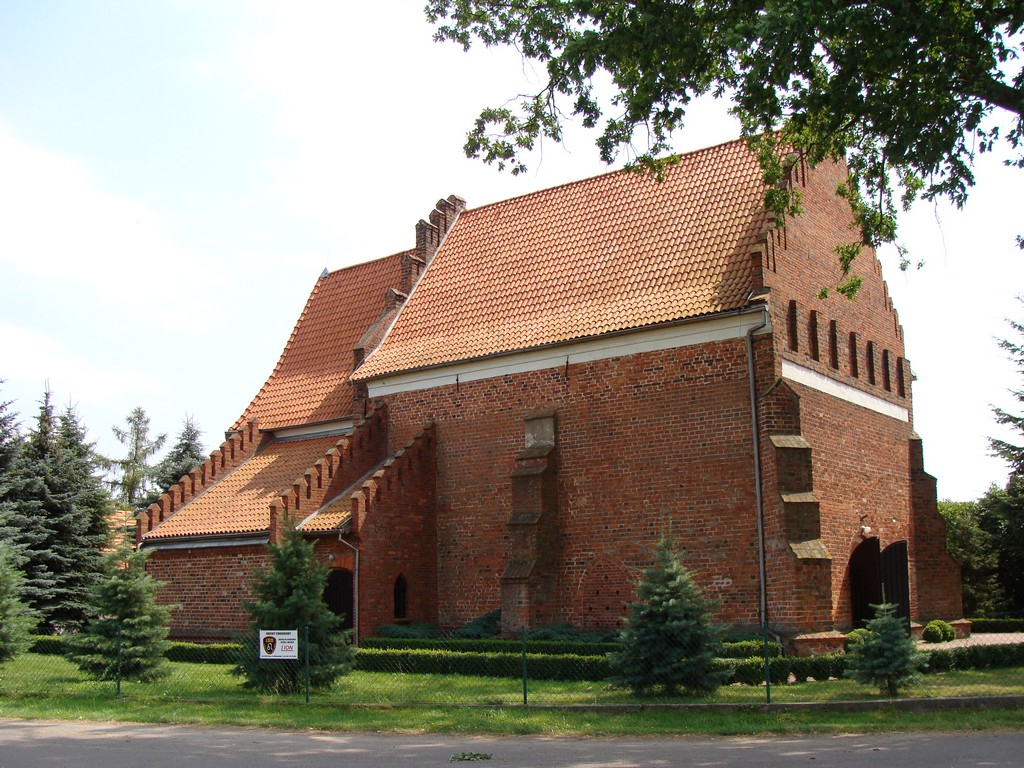
Church of St. Barbara in Jaszkowo

Jaszkowo [jaʂˈkɔvɔ] is a village in the administrative district of Gmina Brodnica, within Śrem County, Greater Poland Voivodeship, in west-central Poland.

Jaszkowo is situated on the Warta River on the left bank.

== History ==
Jaszkowo was first mentioned in 1266, it also mentions Chwalamir, the owner of the village. It is confirmed in the documents of Przemsył II.

From 1975 to 1998, Jaszkowo administratively belonged to Poznań Voivodeship.
