= Madres (album) =

Studio album by Sofia Kourtesis
- Released: 27 October 2023
- Genre: Latin house, deep house
- Length: 47:19
- Label: Ninja Tune
- Producer: Sofia Kourtesis; David Krasemann; Thomas Stephens

Sofia Kourtesis chronology
Fresia Magdalena (2021)	Madres (2023)

Singles from Madres
- 1. "Estación Esperanza" Released: 17 January 2022; 2. "Madres" Released: 14 March 2023; 3. "Si Te Portas Bonito" Released: 26 July 2023; 4. "Vajkoczy" Released: 29 August 2023; 5. "How Music Makes You Feel Better" Released: 27 September 2023

Madres is the debut album by Peruvian producer Sofia Kourtesis, released on 27 October 2023 through Ninja Tune. It was preceded by the singles "Estación Esperanza" featuring Manu Chao, "Madres" and "Si Te Portas Bonito". It received acclaim from critics and charted in Scotland as well as on several UK component charts.

== Background ==
Kourtesis wrote the track "Madres" about her mother, and named the track "Vajkoczy" after the neurosurgeon Peter Vajkoczy, who "helped save her mother's life" after her cancer diagnosis.

== Critical reception ==
Professional ratings
Aggregate scores
Source	Rating
Metacritic	86/100
Review scores
Source	Rating
AllMusic	4/5 stars
Mojo	4/5 stars
MusicOMH	3.5/5 stars
NME	4/5 stars
Pitchfork	8.5/10

Madres received a score of 86 out of 100 on review aggregator Metacritic based on nine critics' reviews, indicating "universal acclaim". Writing for Pitchfork, which awarded it their "Best New Music" distinction, Steven Arroyo described the album as "a shimmery collection of protest chants, club rhythms, and sunlit synths that testifies to dance music's spiritual nourishment". NME's Aneesa Ahmed called it a "true love letter to the varied, invigorating sounds that have shaped Kourtesis", one that "cements her position as a bold and crafty producer of house-infused dancefloor heaters".

Paul Simpson of AllMusic commented that "compared to her earlier EPs, Madres feels more refined and less quirky and glitchy" and it "deals with serious subject matter, but ultimately it's an abundantly thankful, joyous, and celebratory record". MusicOMH's Ben Devlin stated that Kourtesis is "lucky" that her "beats have the character to fill an LP while mostly keeping to a modest, shimmying intensity", which he felt "portends a warm reception in the club scene". Mojo characterised it as "an intimate portrait painted in bold strokes".

Pitchfork ranked it the 24th best album of 2023.

== Track listing ==
All tracks are written by Sofia Kourtesis, except where noted.

Madres track listing
No.	Title	Writer(s)	Length
1.	"Madres"		3:56
2.	"Si Te Portas Bonito"	Sofia Kourtesis; Thomas Stephens	5:01
3.	"Vajkoczy"	Kourtesis; Johnetta Bryant	4:10
4.	"How Music Makes You Feel Better"		4:43
5.	"Habla con Ella"		3:24
6.	"Funkhaus"		5:52
7.	"Estación Esperanza" (featuring Manu Chao)	Kourtesis; Manu Chao	4:54
8.	"Prima"		5:16
9.	"Cecilia"		4:39
10.	"El Carmen"		5:24
Total length:			47:19

== Personnel ==
- Sofia Kourtesis – vocals, production
- David Krasemann – production (tracks 1, 3–10), mixing (all tracks)
- Thomas Stephens – production (track 2)
- Max Gilkes – mastering (tracks 1, 2, 8)
- Hans Frage – mastering (tracks 2–7, 9, 10)

== Charts ==
Chart performance for Madres
Chart (2023)	Peak position
Scottish Albums (OCC)	75
UK Album Downloads (OCC)	19
UK Dance Albums (OCC)	2
UK Independent Albums (OCC)	31
