= Ludwikowo, Śrem County =

Ludwikowo
- Village
- Location within Poland
- Coordinates: 52°8′N 16°57′E
- Country: Poland
- Voivodeship: Greater Poland
- County: Śrem
- Gmina: Brodnica
- Population: 40

Ludwikowo [ludviˈkɔvɔ] is a village in the administrative district of Gmina Brodnica, within Śrem County, Greater Poland Voivodeship, in west-central Poland. The Eastern end of the Żabińskie Mountains reaches here. From 1975 to 1998, Ludwikowo administratively belonged to Poznań Voivodeship.
