= Stare Szkoty =

Neighbourhood of Gdańsk, Poland

- Neighbourhood of Gdańsk
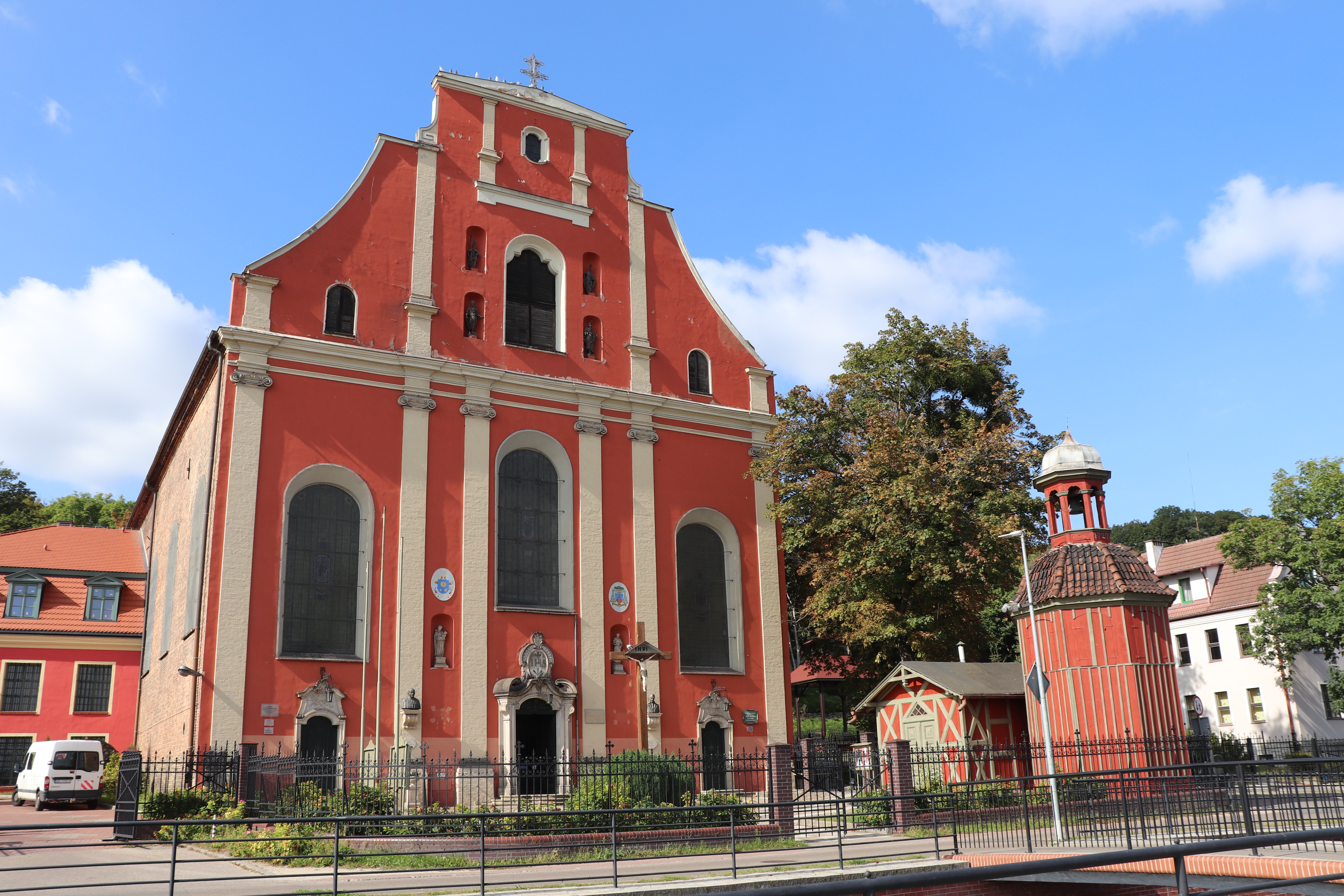
- Baroque Saint Ignatius of Loyola church

- Location within Poland
- Coordinates: 54°20′6″N 18°38′6″E
- Country: Poland
- Voivodeship: Pomeranian
- County/City: Gdańsk
- Time zone: UTC+1 (CET)
  - Summer (DST): UTC+2 (CEST)
- Vehicle registration: GD

Stare Szkoty [ˈstarɛ ˈʂkɔtɨ] is a neighbourhood of Gdańsk, Poland, located in the south-central part of the city.

== History ==
Stare Szkoty was a suburb of Gdańsk, and a private church village of the Roman Catholic Diocese of Włocławek, administratively located in the Gdańsk County in the Pomeranian Voivodeship of the Kingdom of Poland. By the 16th century, the bishops of Włocławek settled craftsmen in the suburb, mainly Dutch Mennonites, Jews and Scots, who at the time had no chance to develop their enterprises in Gdańsk itself. The suburb was named after the Scottish settlers. In 1621, a Jesuit College was established, which in 1765–1775 was attended by Józef Wybicki, author of the lyrics of the national anthem of Poland.
