= Iłówiec, Greater Poland Voivodeship =

Iłówiec
- Village
- Location within Poland
- Coordinates: 52°10′N 16°49′E
- Country: Poland
- Voivodeship: Greater Poland
- County: Śrem
- Gmina: Brodnica
- Population: 80

Iłówiec [iˈwuvjɛt͡s] is a village in the administrative district of Gmina Brodnica, within Śrem County, Greater Poland Voivodeship, in west-central Poland.

From 1975 to 1998, Iłówiec administratively belonged to Poznań Voivodeship.
