= Żurawiec, Śrem County =

Żurawiec
- Village
- Location within Poland
- Coordinates: 52°10′N 16°57′E
- Country: Poland
- Voivodeship: Greater Poland
- County: Śrem
- Gmina: Brodnica

Żurawiec [ʐuˈravjɛt͡s] is a village in the administrative district of Gmina Brodnica, within Śrem County, Greater Poland Voivodeship, in west-central Poland.
