= Środa Wielkopolska =

Town in Greater Poland Voivodeship, Poland

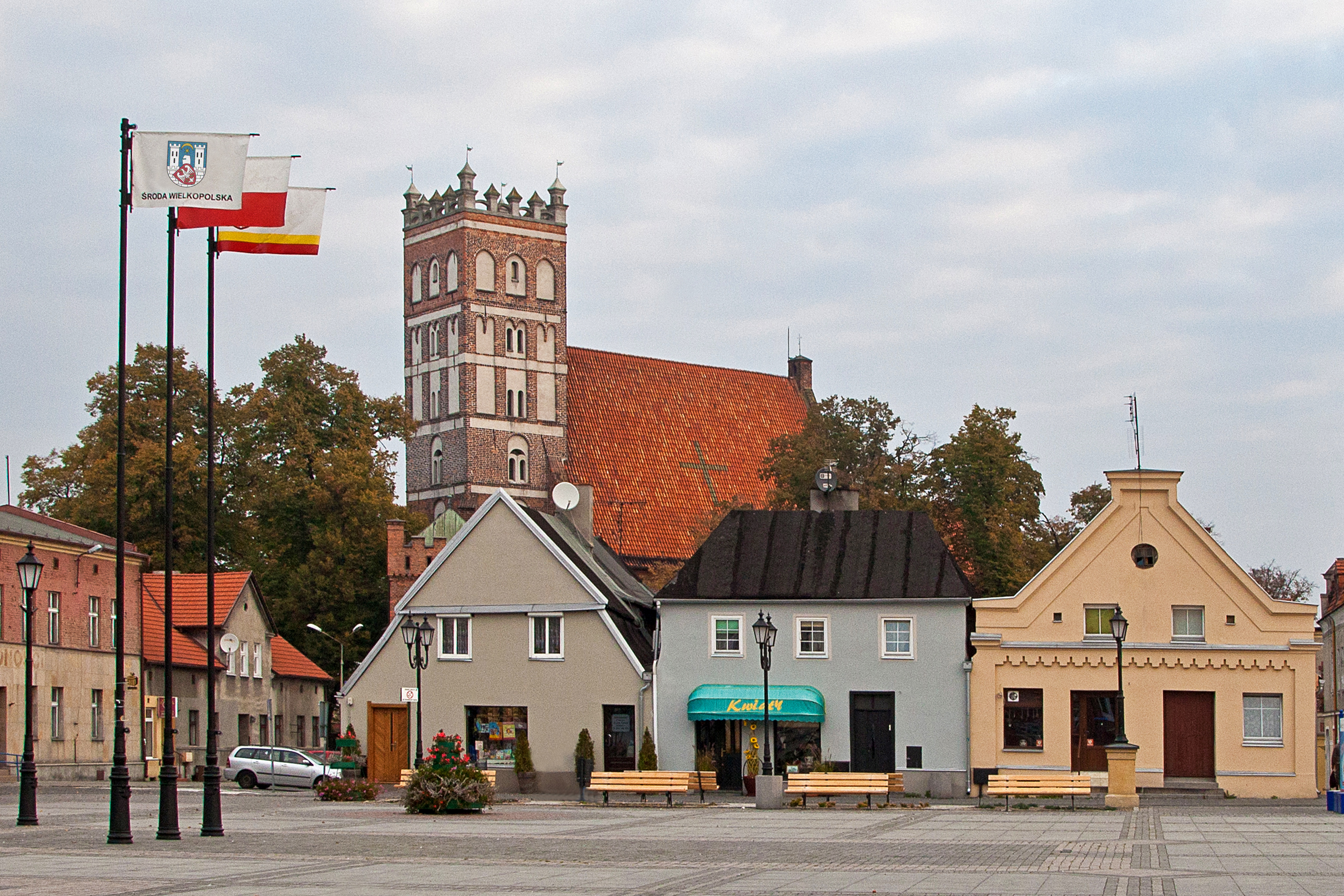
- Collegiate church and marketplace

- Flag Coat of arms

- Location within Poland
- Coordinates: 52°14′N 17°17′E
- Country: Poland
- Voivodeship: Greater Poland
- County: Środa
- Gmina: Środa Wielkopolska

Government
  - Mayor: Piotr Mieloch

Area
  - Total: 17.98 km^{2} (6.94 sq mi)

Population (2009)
  - Total: 22,001
  - Density: 1,224/km^{2} (3,169/sq mi)
- Time zone: UTC+1 (CET)
  - Summer (DST): UTC+2 (CEST)
- Postal code: 63-000
- Car plates: PSR
- Climate: Cfb
- Website: www.sroda.wlkp.pl

Środa Wielkopolska (Polish: [ˈɕrɔda vjɛlkɔˈpɔlska]; until 1968 Środa) is a town in western-central Poland, situated in the Greater Poland Voivodeship, about 30 kilometres (19 mi) southeast of Poznań, with 22,001 inhabitants (2009). It is the seat of Środa County, and of Gmina Środa Wielkopolska (a district within the county).

== History ==
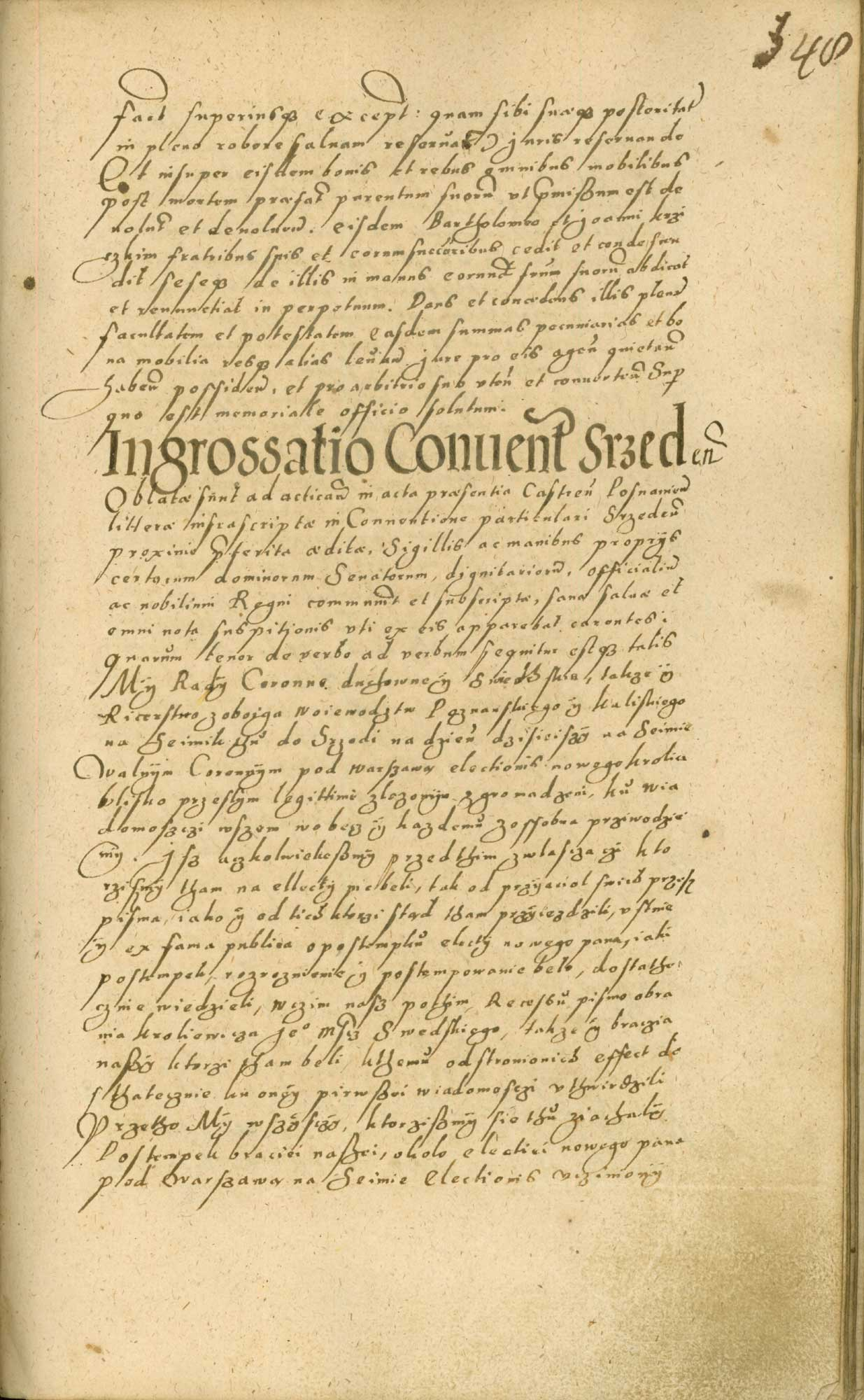
Resolution of the sejmik of Poznań and Kalisz voivodeships in Środa approving the election of Sigismund III Vasa as King of Poland in 1587

A stronghold existed at the site in the Middle Ages. The oldest known mention of Środa dates back to 1228. Środa was probably granted town rights in 1261. It was a royal town of the Kingdom of Poland, administratively located in the Kalisz Voivodeship in the Greater Poland Province. In 1402–1413 Polish King Władysław II Jagiełło built a Gothic castle in Środa. In the 15th century Środa was one of the largest towns in Greater Poland, trade and crafts developed, and from 1454 the sejmiks (regional parliaments) of both the Kalisz and Poznań voivodeships were held in the town.

In the Second Partition of Poland in 1793 the town was annexed by Prussia. After the successful Greater Poland uprising of 1806, it was regained by Poles and became part of the short-lived Duchy of Warsaw. After the duchy's dissolution in 1815, it was annexed by Prussia for the second time, and from 1871 it also was part of Germany. It was an important center of Polish resistance, and during the Greater Poland uprising (1848) the largest insurgent camp was established there, led by Augustyn Brzeżański. The town was restored to Poland in 1919, after Poland regained independence after World War I. According to the 1921 census, the town had a population of 7,231, 96.6% Polish and 3.2% German by nationality.

During World War II Środa was under German occupation from September 1939 to January 1945. Poles were subjected to mass arrests, expulsions and massacres. The Einsatzgruppe VI entered the town after September 12, 1939. A prison for Poles was established in the town. On September 17, 1939, the Gestapo murdered 21 Poles from Środa in the neighbouring village of Kijewo, and on October 20, 1939, Germans carried out a public execution of 29 Poles, including teachers, merchants, engineers, lawyers, landowners, and post and bank employees, at the market square. Leonard Cybichowski, principal of the local agricultural school, was one of Polish school principals and teachers murdered in the Dachau concentration camp. In 1939, Germans expelled families of Poles who were either murdered in the massacres or deported to Nazi concentration camps as part of the Intelligenzaktion. In 1940, Germans expelled the owners of shops, workshops and bigger houses, which were then handed over to German colonists as part of the Lebensraum policy. Further expulsions were carried out in February 1941. In 1940 the local parish church was closed down.

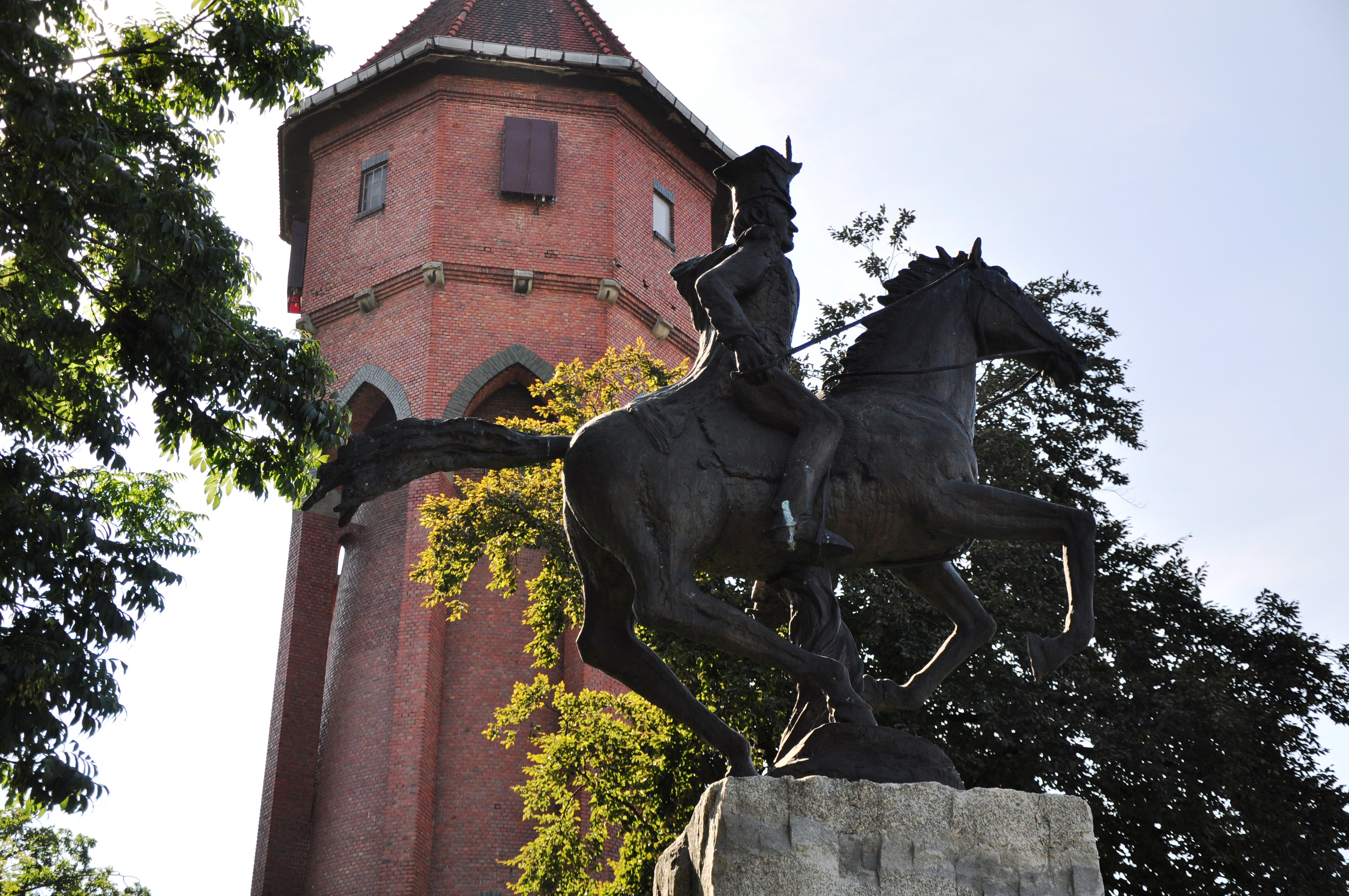
Jan Henryk Dąbrowski monument with a historic water tower in the background

In 1968 the town's name was changed to Środa Wielkopolska by adding the adjective Wielkopolska after the region of Greater Poland, within which it is located, to distinguish it from the town of Środa Śląska in Lower Silesia. From 1975 to 1998 Środa was administratively part of the former Poznań Voivodeship. In 2017 and 2018 town limits were extended by including parts of the neighbouring village of Kijewo.

== Transport ==
Środa lies on the main railway line from Poznań to Katowice (via Jarocin). There is also a steam railway which runs to Zaniemyśl, 14 kilometres (9 mi) to the southeast.

National Road 11 bypasses the town to the south. National Road 11 connects Kołobrzeg on the Baltic Sea coast to Bytom via the city of Poznań.

The nearest airport is Poznań-Ławica Airport.

== Notable people born or raised in Środa Wielkopolska ==
- Monika Buczkowska (born 1992), operatic soprano
- Arthur Greiser (1897–1946), German Nazi SS officer executed for war crimes
- Klaus von Klitzing (born 1941), German physicist, winner of the 1985 Nobel Prize in Physics
- Franz Mertens (1840–1927), Polish-Austrian mathematician
- Rafał Wieruszewski (born 1981), Polish sprinter who specializes in the 400 metres.

== International relations ==
=== Twin towns — Sister cities ===
Środa Wielkopolska is twinned with:

- Hoyerswerda, Germany
- Prostějov, Czech Republic
- Vitré, Ille-et-Vilaine, France
