= Józef Wybicki =

Polish poet, author of the national anthem (1747–1822)

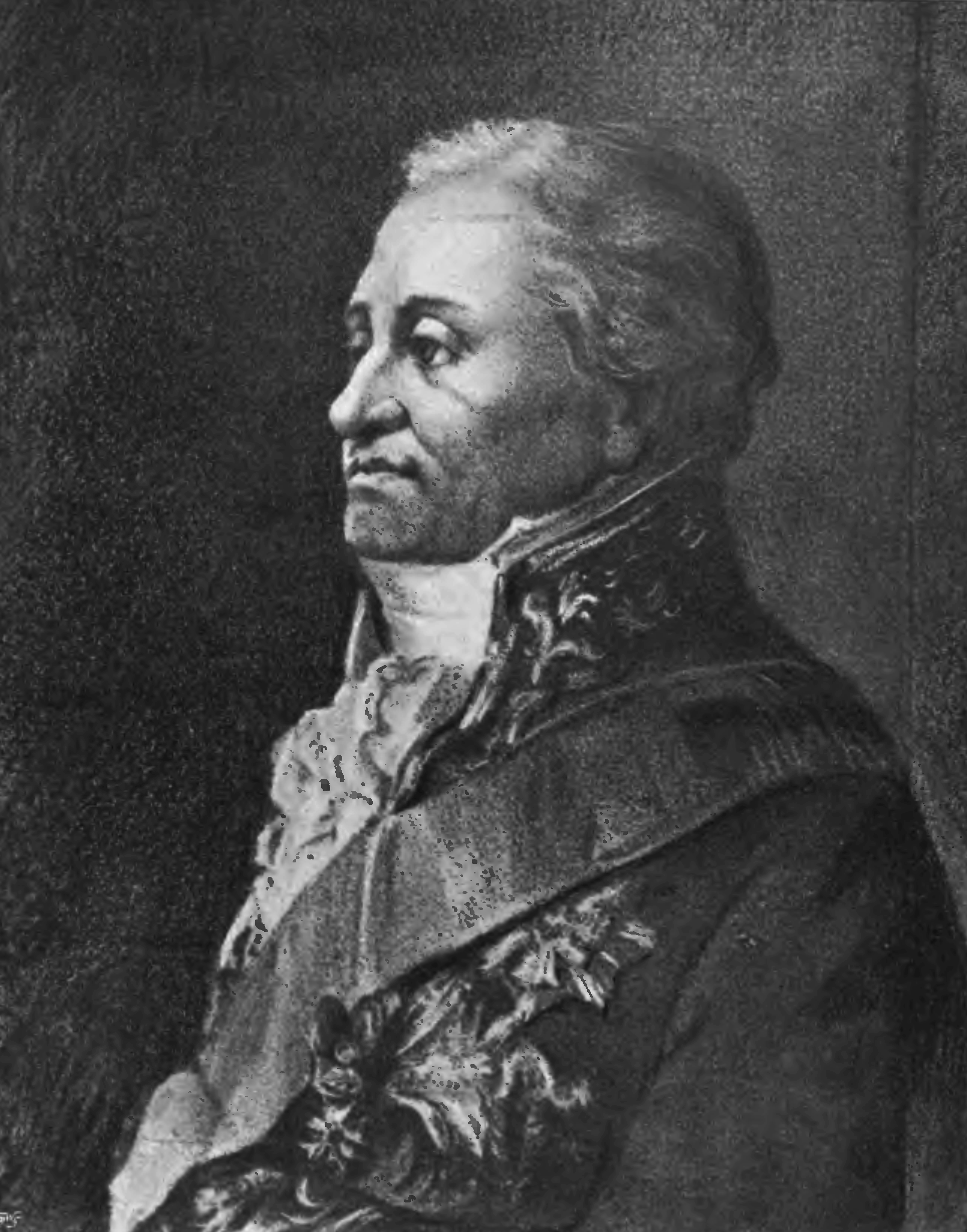

- Coat of arms: Rogala
- Known for: Author of the Polish national anthem "Mazurek Dąbrowskiego"
- Born: 29 September 1747; Będomin, Polish–Lithuanian Commonwealth (now Poland)
- Died: 10 March 1822 (aged 74); Manieczki, Prussia (now Poland)
- Buried: Church of St. Adalbert, Poznań
- Noble family: Wybicki herbu (coat of arms) Rogala
- Spouses: 1. Kunegunda Drwęska (1773–1775); 2. Estera Wierusz-Kowalska (1780)
- Father: Piotr Wybicki
- Mother: Konstancja Wybicka, née Lniska

Józef Rufin Wybicki (Polish pronunciation: [ˈjuzɛv vɨˈbit͡skʲi]; 29 September 1747 – 10 March 1822) was a Polish nobleman, jurist, poet, political and military activist of Kashubian descent. He is best remembered as the author of "Mazurek Dąbrowskiego" (English: "Dąbrowski's Mazurka"), which was adopted as the Polish national anthem in 1927.

== Early life ==
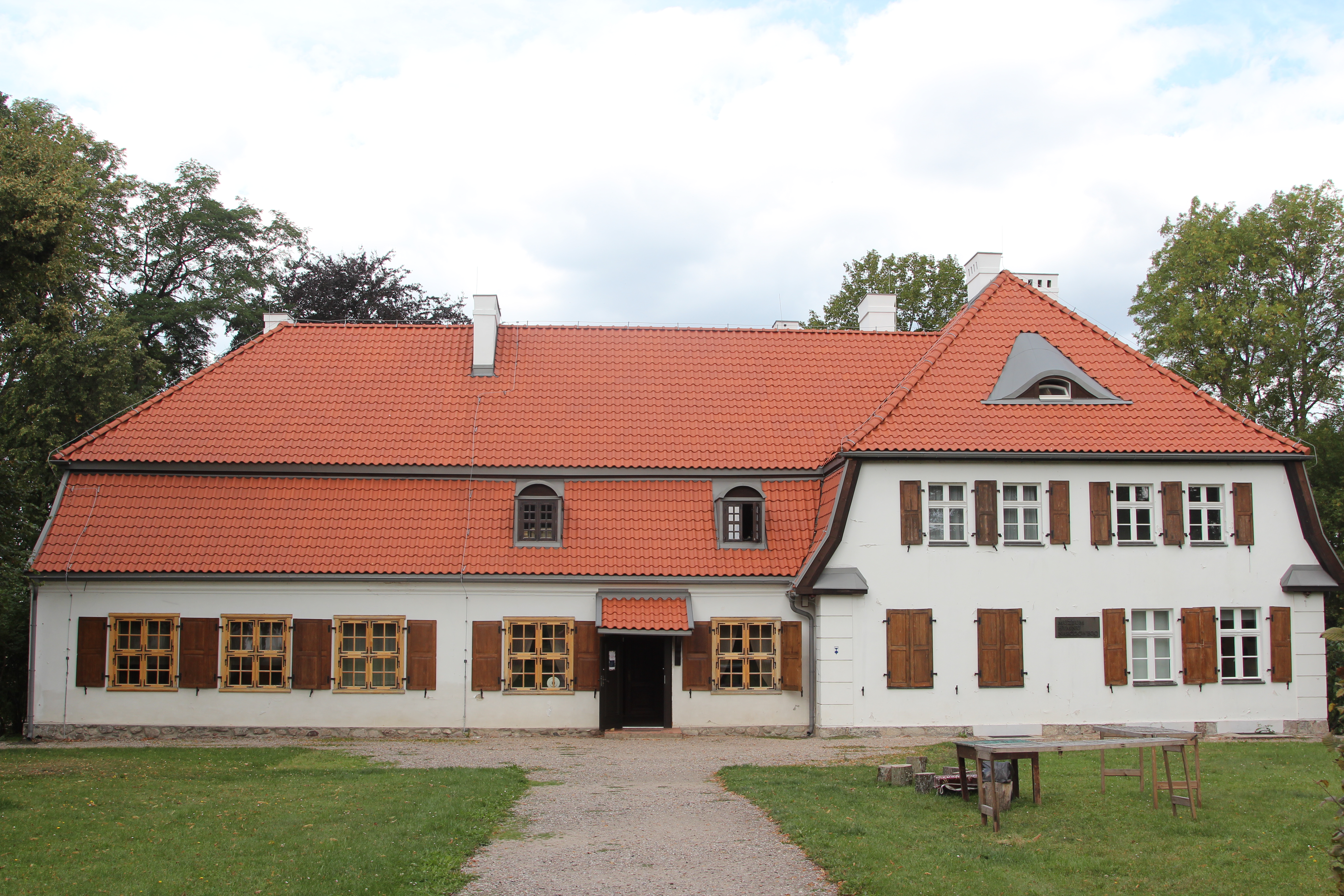
Manor house (dwór) of Józef Wybicki in Będomin, now museum

Wybicki was born in Będomin, in the region of Pomerania in the Polish–Lithuanian Commonwealth. His family was Pomeranian nobility.

In 1755–1765 he attended a Jesuit school in Stare Szkoty. In 1762–1765, he studied law at a court in Skarszewy.

== Political and civil service career ==
In 1767, he worked at the Crown Tribunal in Bydgoszcz. Wybicki was elected a deputy to the Repnin Sejm, the session of Polish parliament in 1767, on the eve of the First Partition of Poland. Subsequently, he joined the insurgency known as the Confederation of Bar (1768–1772), aimed at opposing the Russian influence and king Stanisław August Poniatowski. He was one of the advisors (konsyliarz) of the Confederacy, acting as a diplomat. After the failure of the uprising, he spent some time in the Netherlands, studying law at Leiden University.

Returning to Poland, in the 1770s and 1780s he was associated with the Commission of National Education. He supported King Stanisław August Poniatowski and his proposed reforms. He helped draft the liberal Zamoyski Codex of laws of the late 1770s. He was a Patriotic Party activist during the Great Sejm (1788–92) – though he was not one of its first deputies, during much of that time staying at his estate, writing and staging operas. He did, however, participate in the Great Sejm's deliberations, beginning in 1791. In 1792, in the aftermath of the Polish–Russian War of 1792, like many of Poniatowski's supporters, he joined the Targowica Confederation.

He participated in the Kościuszko Uprising (1794) and was a member of the Military Section of the Provisional Council of the Duchy of Masovia. During the uprising, he co-organized the Polish administration in the liberated city of Bydgoszcz. After the failure of this insurrection he moved to France.

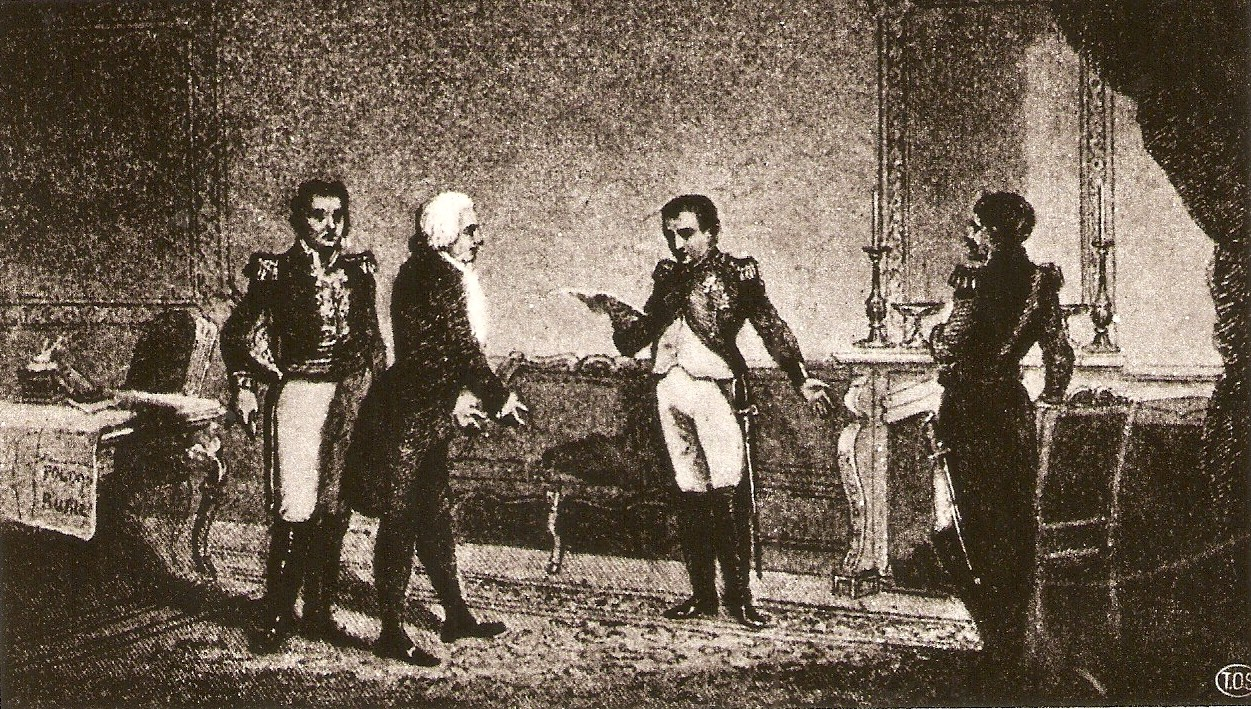
Jan Henryk Dąbrowski and Wybicki met Napoleon in Berlin in 1806

He was a close friend of both Tadeusz Kościuszko and Jan Henryk Dąbrowski. With Dąbrowski he organized the Polish Legions in Italy, serving under Napoleon Bonaparte. In 1797, while in Reggio Emilia, Italy, he wrote Mazurek Dąbrowskiego (Dąbrowski's Mazurek). In 1806 he helped Dąbrowski organize the Greater Poland Uprising.

After the creation of the Duchy of Warsaw in 1807, he held a number of positions in its Department of Justice, and continued working for it after the Duchy's transformation into Congress Poland. In 1817 he became president of the Supreme Court of Congress Poland.

He died on 10 March 1822 in Manieczki, then part of the Grand Duchy of Posen in the Prussian Partition of Poland.

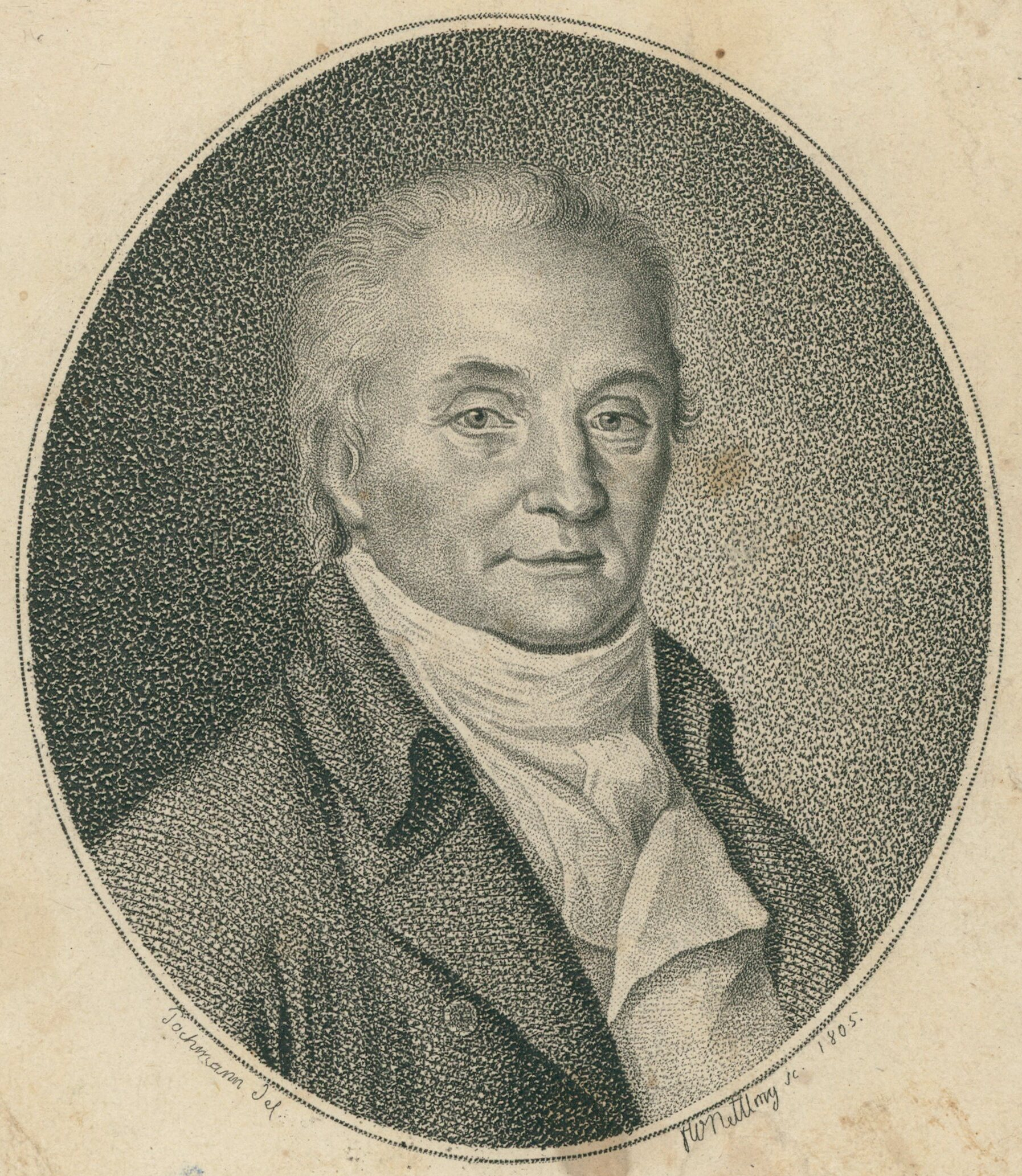
Józef Wybicki

== Works ==
Wybicki was a writer, journalist and a poet. He wrote political-themed poems, plays and political treaties advocating reforms in Poland in the 1770s and 1780s. His works of that time analyzed the Polish political system, the concepts of liberty, and advocated for more rights for the peasantry. He would also publish more political brochures in the 1800s, advocating for liberal reforms in the Duchy of Warsaw.

Mazurek Dąbrowskiego (Dąbrowski's Mazurka) remains Wybicki's most famous creation. It has been regarded as an unofficial national anthem since the November Uprising of 1831. In 1927 the Mazurka was officially adopted as the Polish national anthem by the Polish parliament (Sejm).

== See also ==
- Polish Enlightenment
