= Vistula delta Mennonites =

Historic Mennonite community

Vistula delta Mennonites (Polish: Menonici delty Wisły) were a historic Mennonite community established in the mid-16th century in the Vistula river delta in Poland. It originated in the Netherlands and present-day northern Germany. The Mennonite community played an important role in draining and cultivating the Vistula delta and establishing trade relations with the Netherlands. In the late 18th century, a significant number of Mennonites emigrated further and formed the nucleus of the Mennonite settlements in Russia, while many remained in the region after the annexation of the region by Prussia in the Partitions of Poland. With the end of World War II and the flight and expulsion of Germans (including Germanized Dutch settlers), the Mennonite settlements in the Vistula delta ceased to exist.

The Plautdietsch language, a mixture of Dutch and the local Low German dialect, originated in the Vistula delta and is still used by Mennonite communities worldwide.

== Origins ==
The Mennonite movement was founded by Menno Simons, a Frisian, Roman Catholic priest who left the Church in 1536 and became a leader within the Anabaptist movement. The Low Countries regions of Friesland and Flanders, as well as Eastern Frisia and Holstein, became a center of the Mennonites. Religious persecution in the Low Countries under Fernando Álvarez de Toledo, 3rd Duke of Alba, forced many Mennonites to leave in the 16th century.

== Danzig community ==
The first Anabaptist in the area, a local resident, was reported in 1526 in Marienburg (Malbork). In the 1530s, Dutch Mennonites from what is now the Netherlands and Belgium moved to the area of Danzig (Gdańsk) Poland's principal seaport, which was connected to the Low Countries by traditional grain trade. Menno Simons apparently visited the community in 1549, and in 1569, Dirk Philips founded the first Mennonite Church in Danzig. Soon, about 1,000 Mennonites lived in the city. Mennonites enjoyed religious freedom in traditionally tolerant Poland, which was officially confirmed since the Warsaw Confederation of 1573.

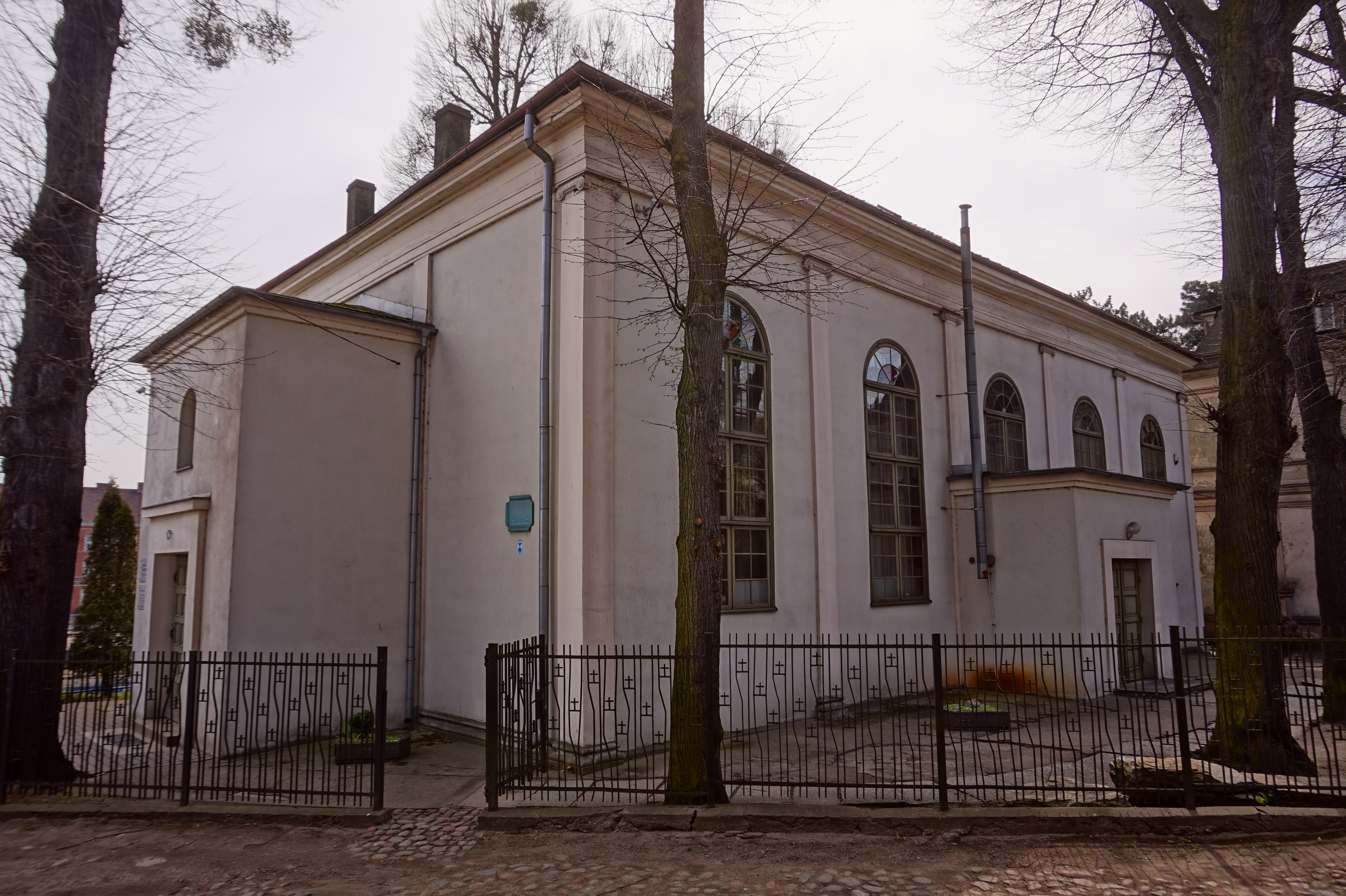
Former Mennonite Church in Gdańsk

In 1552, the Danzig city council allowed Mennonites to practise their faith but refused to grant Mennonites the formal status of a Citizen, a situation unchanged until the city was annexed by the Kingdom of Prussia in the Second Partition of Poland in 1793. As a result, most of them settled in the suburbs of Schidlitz (Siedlce), Petershagen and Alt-Schottland (Stare Szkoty). The relationship between the city council and the Mennonites was often ambivalent. Though their faith was generally tolerated, protests from local craftspeople caused the ban of Mennonite traders and artisans from participating in the annual trade fairs. In 1582, the city council judged local guilds’ complaints against the employment of Mennonite linen weavers by the Catholic St. Bridget's Church, which decided to limit the number of Mennonite weavers to one per abbey. In 1583, the council unsuccessfully requested the Polish King to dislodge the Mennonites in the suburb of Alt-Schottland, while in 1586, the King asked the council not to tolerate this “human plague” inside the city. However, the Mennonite community in Danzig grew and played an important role in grain trade with the Low Countries.

== Vistula Delta settlement ==
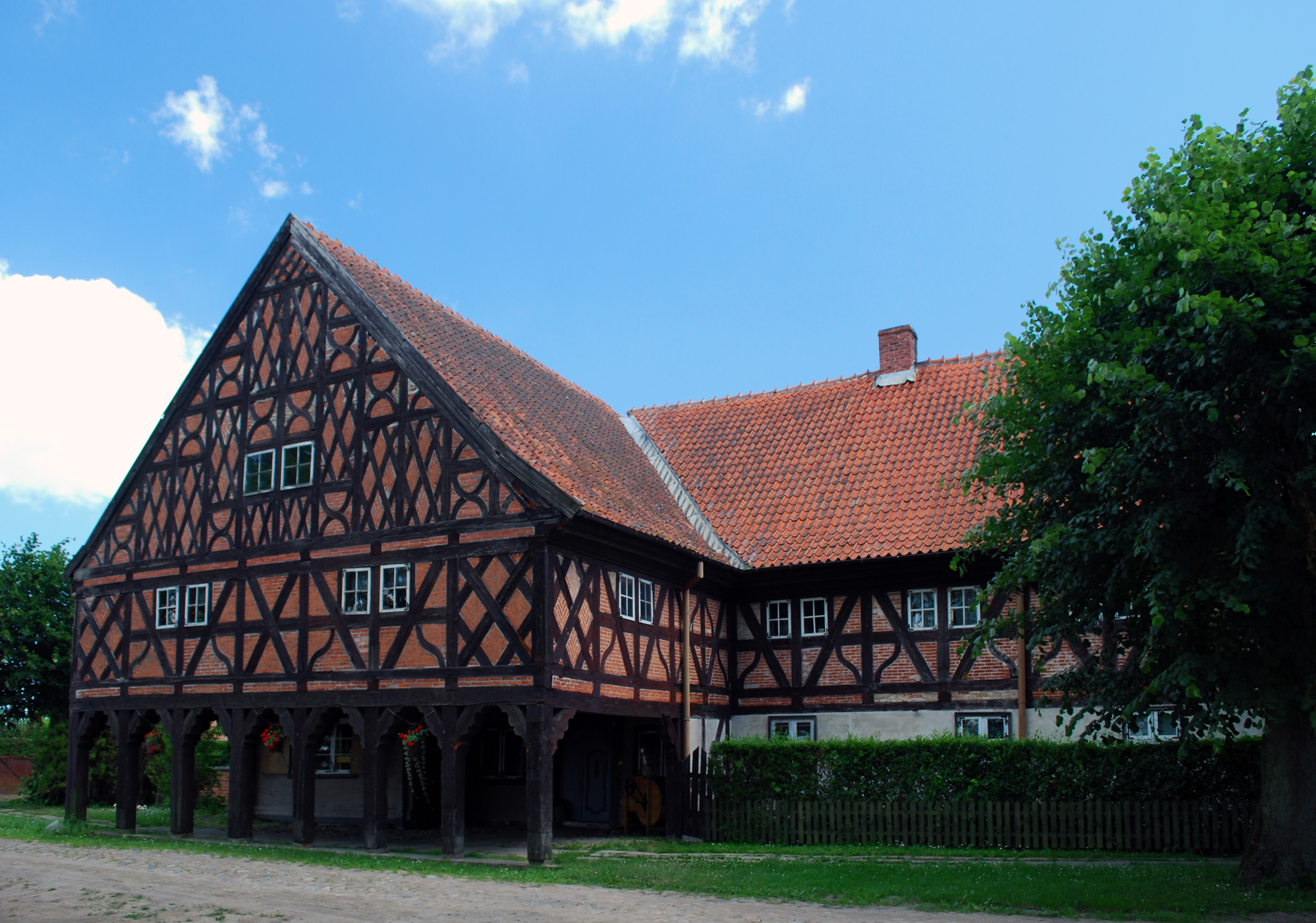
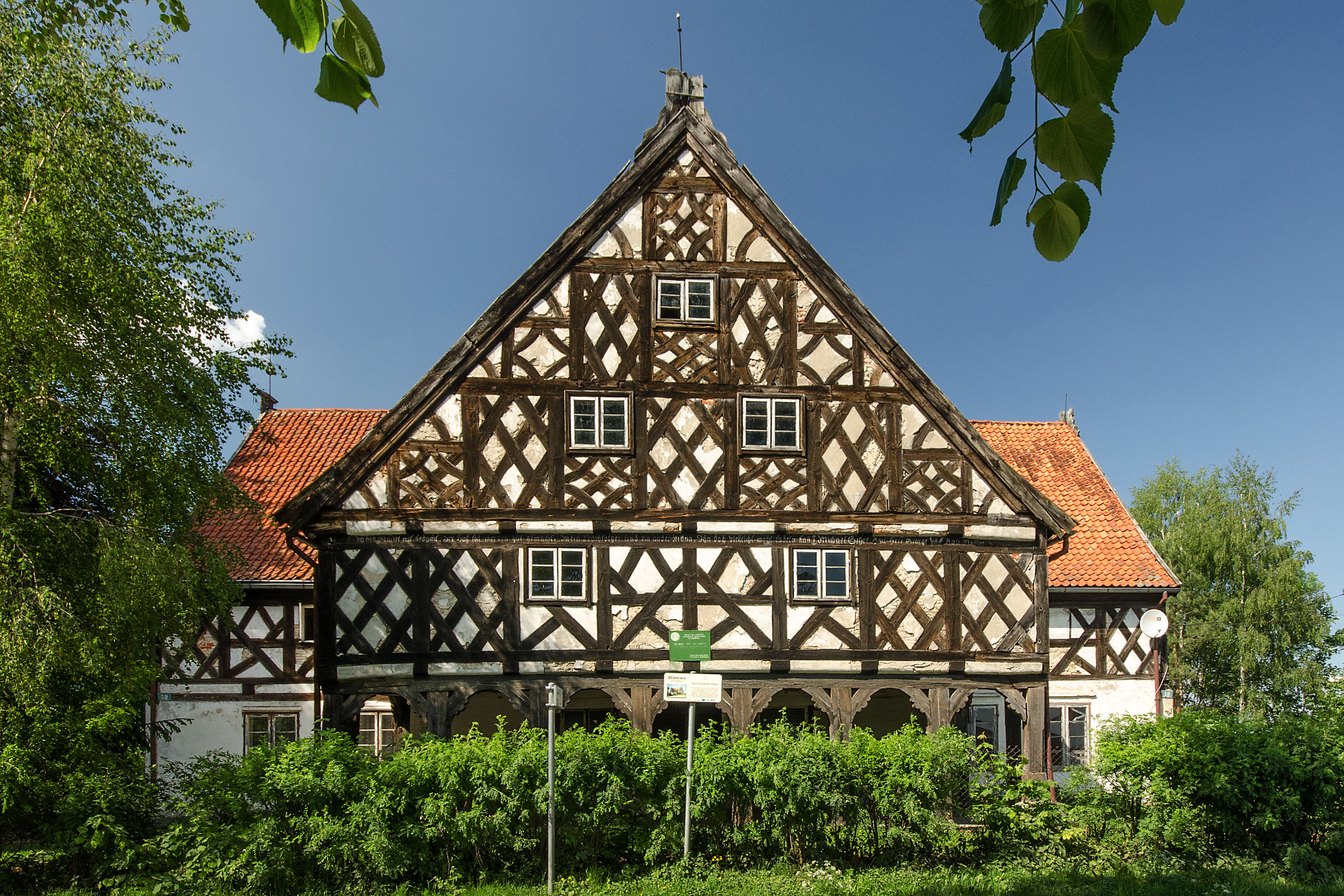
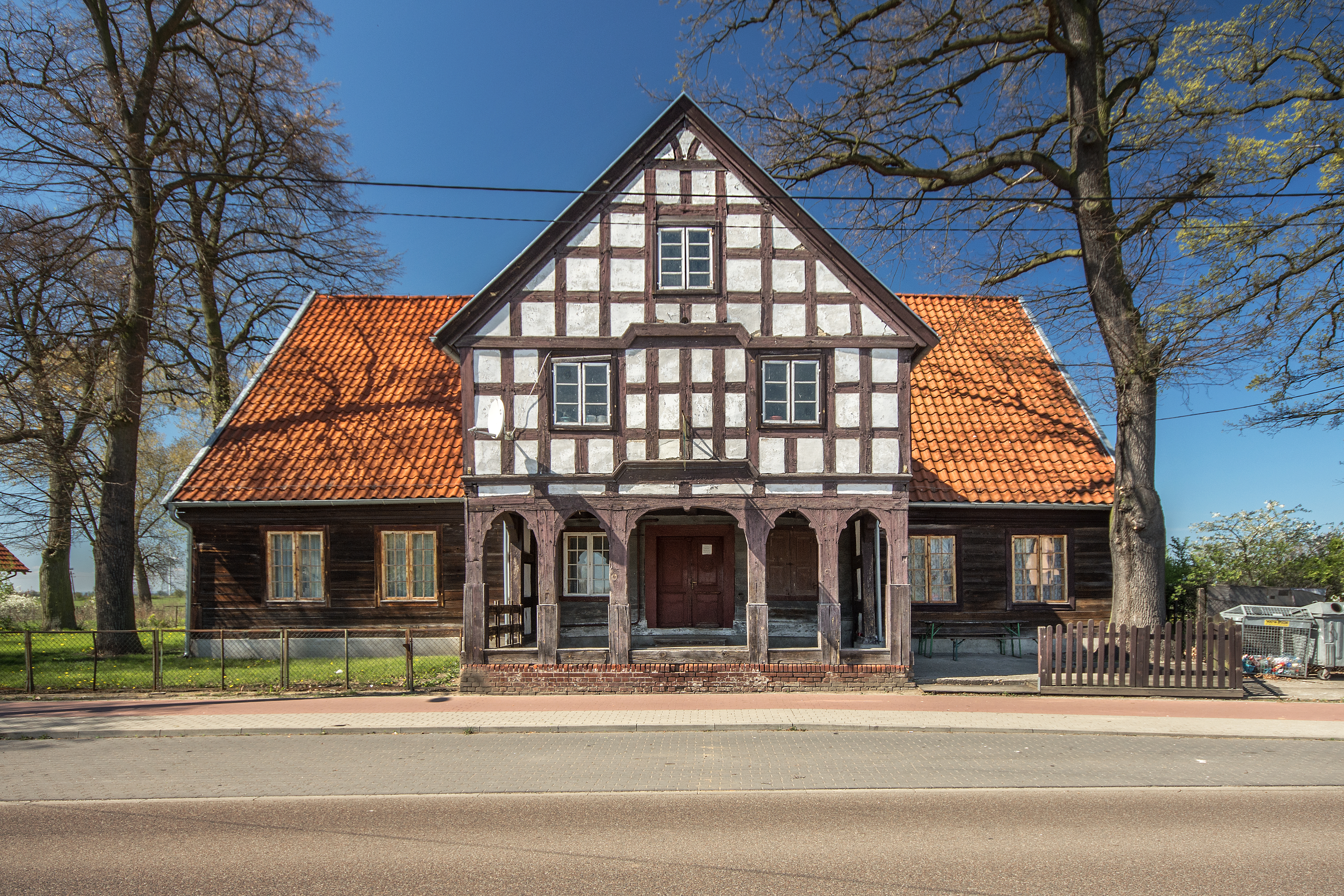
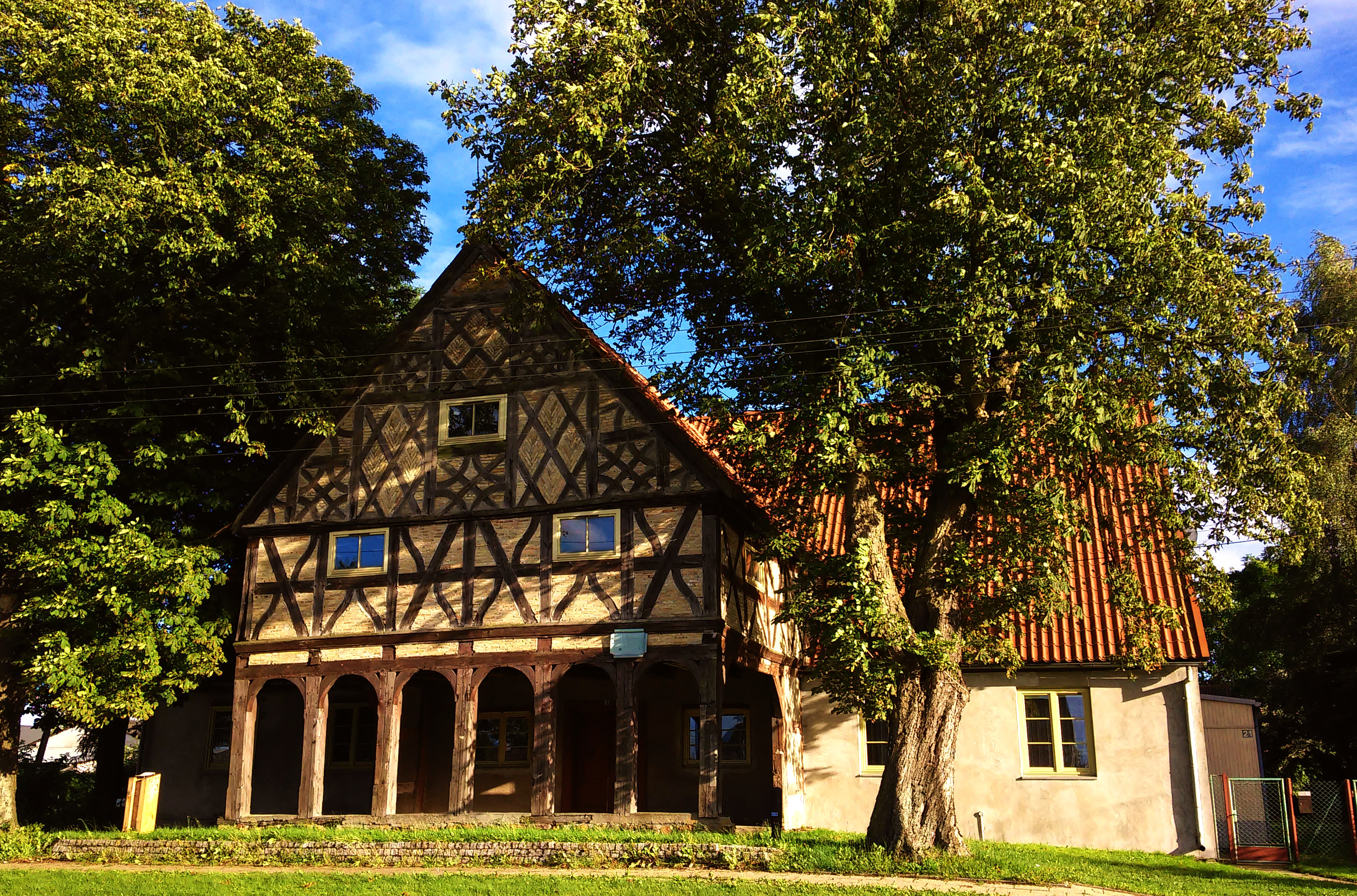
Old Mennonite houses in Trutnowy, Stalewo, Nowy Staw and Koszwały

While the situation of Mennonites in the city was often complicated, the settlement in the area along the Vistula became an appealing alternative.

Large areas of the Vistula Delta were in the possession of the city or its burghers (citizens). This area was however devastated in the Polish–Teutonic War (1519–1521) and furthermore destroyed by a severe flood in 1540. In 1543, the city council reported that many villages of formerly 15 to 20 farms did not exist any more.

Michael Loitz, a Danzig councillor and merchant, had received a thirty-year lease of an area at the river Tiege (Tuja) by the Polish King. Then in 1562 he invited Mennonites to settle there and cultivate the Vistula marshes. Low Country-style windmills to drain the swamps and Friesian-style houses coined the area from then on. Mennonites were allowed to run their own schools but had to pay school fees for the public school as well. While these charges remained usually undisputed, the duties to local Roman Catholic and Lutheran parishes were often refused.

Vistula delta Mennonites formed one of the largest Mennonite communities in Poland. Other notable communities were located near Warsaw and Przasnysz in Masovia and near Berdyczów in Volhynia.

The different origin of the Mennonites perpetuated in different theological opinions. While a liberal “Friesian” group of merchant traders were part of the Danzig community, a more conservative “Flemish” group dominated along the Vistula. The “Flemish” group kept close contacts to the Low Countries, printed Dutch-language Bibles and invited Dutch sermonizers, while the Dutch influence in the delta region declined.

Plautdietsch, a mixture of Dutch and the Low Prussian dialect of the Vistula Delta, became the typical language of the Mennonites in this region. The first German-language sermon in the Mennonite Church of Danzig in 1762 caused protests by community members and led to a return to the Dutch language. The use of High German language would become one of the basic motivations for subsequent migrations to Russia. In 1768, German hymnbooks were used and only some members continued to use Dutch. The Mennonites from Friesland and Flanders in the delta were over the years also joined by Mennonites from other regions, notably Switzerland and Saxony. A few Poles became Mennonites and were assimilated into the Vistula Delta Mennonites.

== Further emigration ==
In 1772, the Vistula delta and the Danzig suburbs became part of the Kingdom of Prussia after the First Partition of Poland, the city itself after the Second Partition in 1793, at that time 577 Mennonites lived within the city.

In 1772, 12,032 Mennonites lived in the now-Prussian territory. Though their faith was tolerated, the Mennonites became subject to special laws and extra taxes. Only men who had served in the Prussian Army were allowed to purchase land tenure; conscientious objectors were subject to special charges. These regulations led to a large number of young Mennonites without economic prospects.

In 1786, Georg von Trappe, a colonization agent of the Russian government, sought to recruit settlers for the regions recently conquered from the Ottoman Empire. In the following decades, about 6000 Mennonites, most of them from the delta settlements, left for Russia, forming the roots of the Russian Mennonites. The first Mennonite settlement in Russia, Chortitza Colony, was founded by these emigres in 1789.

The Mennonites who remained in the Vistula delta assimilated more and more. In the War of the Sixth Coalition, some young Mennonites were prepared to join the forces against Napoleon. In the Spring of Nations of 1848, Mennonites joined the armed municipal militia (Bürgerwehr), which included the right to bear arms. When, after the foundation of the North German Confederation, general conscription was invented, the Danzig community managed to receive exceptional permission to serve only in non-combat troops; however, a group of Mennonites emigrated to North America to avoid all kind of military service.

At the end of World War II, about 1000 Mennonites lived in Danzig. Along with the rest of the German-speaking population, Mennonites were expelled after World War II to remaining parts of Germany, many of them moving on to North and South America (including Uruguay). The low German Plautdietsch language remains a vital link of the Mennonite communities in North and South America.

== Notable members ==
- Johann Cornies
- Jacob Hoeppner
- Hilmar Kopper
- Wilhelm Mannhardt
- Klaas Reimer

== Mennonite settlements ==
Altendorf (Starza); Aschbuden (Szopy); Christfelde (Chrystkowo); Bärwalde (Niedźwiedzica); Beiershorst (Wybicko)	Ellerwald (Janowo); Heubuden (Stogi); Kerbswalde (Karczowiska Górne); Ladekopp (Lubieszewo); Orlofferfelde (Orłowskie Pole)	Petershagen (Żelichowo); Pietzkendorf (Pieczewo); Pletzendorf; Rehwalde; Reimerswalde (Leśnowo)	Scharpau (Szkarpawa); Siebenhuben; Stobbendorf (Stobiec); Tiegerweide (Cyganek); Tiege (Tuja)

== See also ==
- Olędrzy
- Hauländer
- Vistula Germans
