= 170th Rifle Division =

170th Rifle Division (September 15, 1939 – October 4, 1941) 170th Rifle Division (January 31, 1942 – August 20, 1945)
- Active: 1939–1945
- Country: Soviet Union
- Branch: Red Army
- Type: Infantry
- Size: Division
- Engagements: Battle of Smolensk (1941); Operation Typhoon; Battle of Demyansk Pocket; Battle of Kursk; Operation Kutuzov; Gomel-Rechitsa offensive Parichi-Bobruisk offensive Operation Bagration; Bobruysk offensive Minsk offensive Lublin-Brest offensive Vistula-Oder offensive East Prussian offensive Heiligenbeil Pocket
- Decorations: Order of the Red Banner (2nd Formation); Order of Suvorov (2nd Formation)
- Battle honours: Rechytsa (2nd Formation)

Commanders
- Notable commanders: Maj. Gen. Tikhon Konstantinovich Silkin; Col. Nikolai Matveevich Laskin; Col. Ivan Vladimirovich Panchuk; Col. Stepan Ignatevich Ushakov; Col. Abram Mikhailovich Cheryak; Col. Semyon Grigorovich Tsiplenkov

The 170th Rifle Division was originally formed as an infantry division of the Red Army in the Ural Military District in September 1939, based on the shtat (table of organization and equipment) of that same month. The division was relocated west with the 22nd Army in June 1941. After Germany invaded the Soviet Union, the division took part in the Battle of Smolensk as part of the Western Front. fighting north of Polotsk. During early July 1941 it was encircled along with its 51st Rifle Corps near the town of Nevel and struggled to break out at the cost of considerable losses in personnel and equipment. After the first battles around Velikiye Luki it was partly rebuilt with the escaped elements of the other divisions of its former Corps, but it was again encircled in late August and reduced to remnants. By the beginning of October this cadre had been moved to 24th Army in Reserve Front for another rebuilding, but during Operation Typhoon it was so severely depleted that it had to be disbanded a few days later.

A new 170th was formed between December 1941 and January 1942. In April it joined the 34th Army in the Northwestern Front, which was engaged in the dismal fighting around Demyansk. In July it was reassigned to 11th Army in the same Front and took part in three futile and costly offensives in August, September and November to sever the corridor that joined German 16th Army to its forces inside the pocket. After these forces evacuated Demyansk in February 1943, the 170th was assigned to 53rd Army and moved south to join Central Front inside the Kursk salient. In June it was moved to 48th Army of that Front and it would remain in this Army, with one brief exception, for the duration of the war, mostly as part of 42nd Rifle Corps. The division saw little combat during the German Kursk offensive, but went over to the offensive itself on July 15 when Central Front joined the operation against the German-held Oryol salient. This objective was reached around August 18, and within days the 170th began an advance through northeastern Ukraine toward eastern Belarus. In November, as part of the renamed Belorussian Front it won a battle honor for its part in the liberation of Rechytsa. Through the winter it participated in several battles through the frozen swamps and along the many river lines of this region, after February 1944 as part of the renamed 1st Belorussian Front. During the summer offensive the 170th operated on the northern axis of advance toward the city of Babruysk, assisting in an encirclement operation in the Rahachow–Zhlobin area, and then advancing on Babruysk where it mopped up the German forces that had been trapped there. For these accomplishments it was awarded the Order of Suvorov, 2nd Degree. In the second phase of the offensive the division advanced through Baranavichy in the direction of Brest. In January 1945, as part of 2nd Belorussian Front during the Vistula-Oder offensive, the 170th attacked out of a bridgehead over the Narew River toward Mława, and then in late January reached the Frisches Haff, cutting off the German forces in East Prussia; for its role in this success it was awarded the Order of the Red Banner. In the last months of the war it was in 3rd Belorussian Front and took part in the elimination of a group of German forces southwest of Königsberg, for which several of its subunits received decorations. It remained in the East Prussia area until it was disbanded in August.

== 1st Formation ==
The division was first organized at Sterlitamak in the Ural Military District in September 1939, based on a cadre from the 98th Rifle Division, as part of the major pre-World War II mobilization of the Red Army. The division was mostly composed of Bashkir soldiers and was commanded by Kombrig Tikhon Konstantinovich Silkin; this officer would have his rank modernized to major general on June 4, 1940. Divisional headquarters and most units were based at Sterlitamak. The 422nd Rifle and 512th Howitzer Regiments were at Belebey, and the 717th Rifle Regiment was at Davlekanovo. The 294th Light Artillery Regiment was based at Miass.

On June 22, 1941, its order of battle was as follows:

- 391st Rifle Regiment
- 422nd Rifle Regiment
- 717th Rifle Regiment
- 294th Light Artillery Regiment
- 512th Howitzer Regiment
- 210th Antitank Battalion
- 286th Antiaircraft Battalion
- 134th Reconnaissance Battalion
- 182nd Sapper Battalion
- 210th Signal Battalion
- 154th Medical/Sanitation Battalion
- 140th Chemical Defense (Anti-gas) Platoon
- 49th Motor Transport Battalion
- 132nd Field Bakery
- 481st Field Postal Station
- 366th Field Office of the State Bank

== Battle of Smolensk ==
As the German invasion began on June 22, 1941, the 170th was moving west from the Urals as part of the 22nd Army's 62nd Rifle Corps, and was scheduled to arrive, with its Corps, at Sebezh by July 2. This Army was under the command of Lt. Gen. F. A. Yershakov. By the beginning of July the division had been reassigned to the army's 51st Rifle Corps, joining the 98th and 112th Rifle Divisions. By July 10 the Army had been assigned to Western Front, where it took up positions on the Front's far right (north) flank.

Late on July 11 it was reported that the Front's forces:

fought with attacking enemy units in the Sebezh, Osveia, Borkovichi, Gorodok, Vitebsk, Barsuki Station, and Borkolobovo region, while directing its main efforts at liquidating the enemy's advancing Vitebsk grouping.

The 170th, on the north flank of the 22nd Army and therefore the extreme right flank of the Front, was said to have attacked with its right wing at 1000 hours, while continuing to fight along its previous positions with its left wing. The Army was facing the German VIII Army Corps and XXXIX Motorized Corps. At 0300 hours on July 12, Lt. Gen. G. K. Malandin, the Front's chief of staff, sent instructions to Yershakov and to 19th Army to his south to prepare for a counterstroke on Vitebsk, to start at 0800. These plans were completely preempted when the LVII Motorized Corps, with the cooperation of 9th Army's L and XXIII Army Corps, drove the 22nd Army out of its defenses along the Western Dvina River northwest of Polotsk, cut it into two parts, and threatened both with encirclement. The German armored units bypassed Polotsk and pushed north toward Nevel. Western Front's commander, Marshal S. K. Timoshenko, ordered Yershakov to withdraw to new defenses.

=== First Battle of Velikiye Luki ===
Timoshenko issued new orders on July 14 urging that the German penetrations be cut off and eliminated. Yershakov was to withdraw his 98th and 112th Divisions to "smooth out the front". Over the next two days he became more realistic, and directed his deputy, Lt. Gen. A. I. Yeryomenko, to establish a new defense line from Nevel south to just north of Smolensk. On July 15, General Silkin was removed from his command, replaced by Col. Nikolai Matveevich Laskin, chief of 22nd Army's combat training section. After taking Nevel on July 15, following a battle with the 170th and the 48th Tank Division, the LVII Motorized Corps was ordered to capture Velikiye Luki. This was accomplished at nightfall on July 18 with an isolated thrust by 19th Panzer and 14th Motorized Divisions. The loss of Nevel had already pocketed 51st Corps, the 179th Rifle Division of 62nd Corps, plus three divisions of Northwestern Front's 27th Army. The commander of Army Group North believed, from the papers found on a captured courier, that a total of 13 divisions were trapped, but the OKH was less optimistic. The elimination of this pocket would effectively dispose of any threat to the Army Group's right flank as it advanced on Leningrad.

After the loss of Nevel the 170th, 179th and 48th Tanks withdrew toward Velikiye Luki in some disorder but aided by the comparatively good road between these two places. 14th Motorized was especially overextended and vulnerable to counterattack, and the escaping troops pressed against the light screen it had erected south of Nevel and 12th Infantry Division's blocking positions north of that place. On July 19 the STAVKA ordered 29th Army to begin preparing an attack from the Toropets area toward Velikiye Luki with three divisions. Overnight on July 19/20 this force overran a sector lightly held by 14th Motorized and broke into the clear. 19th Panzer sent a battlegroup to intercept but this ran into unexpectedly stiff resistance. It then abandoned the city itself.

Meanwhile, on July 21 Yershakov was ordered to tie down German forces with local attacks beginning the next day. On July 24, Timoshenko reported the liberation of the city, with the attackers taking up defensive positions along the Lovat River to the north and south. In the process of withdrawing from encirclement, 51st Corps had lost its headquarters as well as the bulk of the 98th and 112th Divisions. The 170th was reported as fighting along a line from Stankovo to Lake Udrai with one group at 0600 hours on July 21 while a second group remained in encirclement and was attempting to escape. At 2000 on July 23 Yershakov effectively admitted that only remnants of the Corps had been able to break out; the division had been attacking to the southwest from the Kozhemiachkino area in and effort to assist its corps-mates to escape.

On July 26 the 170th moved to the Dokuhino area, where it absorbed the remnants of the 98th and 112th Divisions. The following day Yershakov reorganized his Army to defend along the Lovat through Velikiye Luki to Lake Dvina, which was 45km to the southeast. He was directed to hold the city "at all cost". German 9th Army now took up the front south of the city from LVII Motorized but made no immediate effort to retake it. Late on August 3, Western Front reported that the 170th, now back under 62nd Rifle Corps, had repelled an attack by a regiment of German infantry. A further report on August 7 stated that the positions of 22nd Army remained unchanged, with limited artillery exchanges and reconnaissance by both sides.

=== Second Battle of Velikiye Luki ===
Stalin approved a plan on August 15 by Timoshenko to renew the counteroffensive by Western Front, although the task allotted to 22nd Army was largely to continue to hold its positions. This began on August 17. Two days later Hitler and the OKH ordered Army Group Center to shift the bulk of 3rd Panzer Group to reinforce Army Group North's faltering drive toward Leningrad and also eliminate the perceived threat to Army Group Center's left flank. This set up a cat-and-mouse game between the two sides, with the German immediate objective of crushing 22nd Army and defeating 29th Army into the bargain.

Western Front first reported at 2000 hours on August 19 about the possibility of a German counterstroke on Velikiye Luki, but also stated that 22nd Army was fortifying its positions. A further report 48 hours later stated:

22nd Army - while defending on its right wing, attacked in its center and left wing at 1300 hours on 21 August to destroy the opposing enemy.

The 170th, which was now under command of 29th Rifle Corps, was said to have advanced toward Mulina and Pronino. This showed Timoshenko's complete ignorance about the true situation, as by now the Army was fighting for its existence. This ignorance continued the next day, although significantly there was no mention of the 170th. Finally, on August 23 the news of Yershakov's actual position broke through the fog, forcing Timoshenko to alter his plans significantly. Noon reports described a German attack affecting most of the Army and at 1430 the neighboring 29th Army stated that "at least an enemy panzer division has penetrated toward Velikiye Luki from the west" and armored reconnaissance troops were in 22nd Army's rear. At this time the 170th was in the vicinity of Balychi, some 35km southeast of the city, facing the 206th Infantry Division as LVII Motorized Corps began to break through farther east.

In his evening report to STAVKA Timoshenko reported that the left (east) flank of 22nd Army, on the sector of 186th Rifle Division, had been penetrated and the Army was "organizing a counterstroke", while the 170th's defenses were defeated and German armor pushed 20km to the north, cutting the Toropets–Velikiye Luki highway. Yershakov was scrambling to respond while being forced to move his headquarters. The next day, the summary identified the 19th and 20th Panzer Divisions as well as a panzer brigade and 206th Infantry, and that a captured order indicated that their objective was to encircle 22nd Army. The situation on 62nd Corps left flank (essentially the 186th) was said to be "unclear"; Yershakov had sent most of the 98th Rifle Division to support the 186th, but both had been effectively smashed by the attack and the 174th Division was forced to flee to the northeast. He was forced to try to defend the city as best he could, while also organizing a credible breakout to the east or northeast. 29th Army was ordered to detach forces to cover Toropets and Staraya Toropa, where the German forces appeared to be heading. In fact, the two panzer divisions were exploiting to take Velikiye Luki from the east while XXIII Army Corps invested it from the south and west. What remained of 22nd Army, some 40,000 personnel, were now confined to a pocket 12-15km from north to south and 16-20km east to west.

Yershakov issued his first breakout order at 1015 hours on August 24, calling for his forces to push eastward along and south of the Toropets–Velikiye Luki highway. The 170th, along with 48th Tanks and 214th Rifle Division, which were close to the breakout sector, were to defend until the evening, "destroy enemy forces in the Ushitsy State Farm region", and then, starting at 2200 hours, begin the breakout, with 126th Rifle Division and 48th Tanks in the first echelon, the 179th and 214th in second, followed by what remained of 62nd Corps and the 170th as rearguard. The artillery and trucks of the 214th were stretched out on the road along its axis of attack and on the morning of the 25th came under heavy air, artillery and mortar attacks, causing considerable losses. The escaping force numbered from 15–20,000 men while another 25,000 of the 22nd Army remained behind in small pockets south of Velikiye Luki and either fought to the death or surrendered over the following days.

The now-deputy chief of staff of Western Front, General Malandin, was sent to Yershakov's headquarters on August 26 to survey the situation as the survivors left the pocket. He reported back near midnight, in part, that the 170th, along with the 126th and 98th Divisions, "appeared in separate disorganized groups". Thus, although they had withdrawn, they were no longer combat-capable. On August 28 Malandin further stated that the division had just 300 men with "...no equipment, headquarters or staff". Despite this, the small handful was concentrated some 30km southwest of Toropets with instructions to operate toward Nazimovo. On September 8 General Yershakov, who had also escaped, wrote an after-action report in which, among other matters, praised the 170th for "stubbornly continu[ing] to hold onto its positions" on August 24. Colonel Laskin would lead a group of 150 armed men to friendly territory on September 18. He remained in command for the remaining weeks of the 1st formation's existence.

The 170th was transferred to 24th Army in Reserve Front for rebuilding in September, but was far from complete when Army Group Center launched Operation Typhoon. It was surrounded with its army north of Spas-Demensk by October 1, and was disbanded on October 4, due to a shortage of equipment. The remaining personnel were moved to 22nd Army headquarters to be reallocated.

== 2nd Formation ==
A new 170th Rifle Division was formed at Kungur, once again in the Ural Military District, based on the 439th Rifle Division which was already forming up when re-designated. Formed between December 20, 1941 and February 13, 1942 the division's personnel were mobilized from the cities of the Urals, with the 294th Artillery Regiment formed in the Kungur area, the 391st Rifle Regiment drawn from those mobilized in Krasnoufimsky District, the 422nd Rifle Regiment from residents of the city of Molotov, and the 717th Rifle Regiment from residents of Sverdlovsk. The division began an accelerated combat and political training program on January 15, and beginning on February 10 was moved to the west, boarding trains bound for the Vologda area. Concentrating at Vologda on February 22, the division was assigned to the 58th Army of the Reserve of the Supreme High Command. From March 28 the division was railed forward to the region of Krasnoborye village, and on April 4 subordinated to the Volkhov Front, remaining part of the front reserve until April 24. On April 29 the division was deployed to the vicinity of the village of Chirki, joining the 34th Army of the Northwestern Front.

The order of battle remained mostly the same as the 1st formation:

- 391st Rifle Regiment
- 422nd Rifle Regiment
- 717th Rifle Regiment
- 294th Artillery Regiment
- 210th Antitank Battalion
- 134th Reconnaissance Company (later 124th)
- 182nd Sapper Battalion
- 355th Signal Battalion (later 210th Signal Battalion, 353rd Signal Company)
- 154th Medical/Sanitation Battalion
- 536th Chemical Defense (Anti-gas) Platoon
- 49th Motor Transport Company
- 452nd Field Bakery
- 917th Divisional Veterinary Hospital
- 294th Field Postal Station (later 1673rd)
- 1094th Field Office of the State Bank

Col. Ivan Vladimirovich Panchuk was appointed to command on January 31, 1942. This officer had led the survivors of his 290th Rifle Regiment (186th Rifle Division) out of the August encirclement of 22nd Army.

== Battle of Demyansk ==
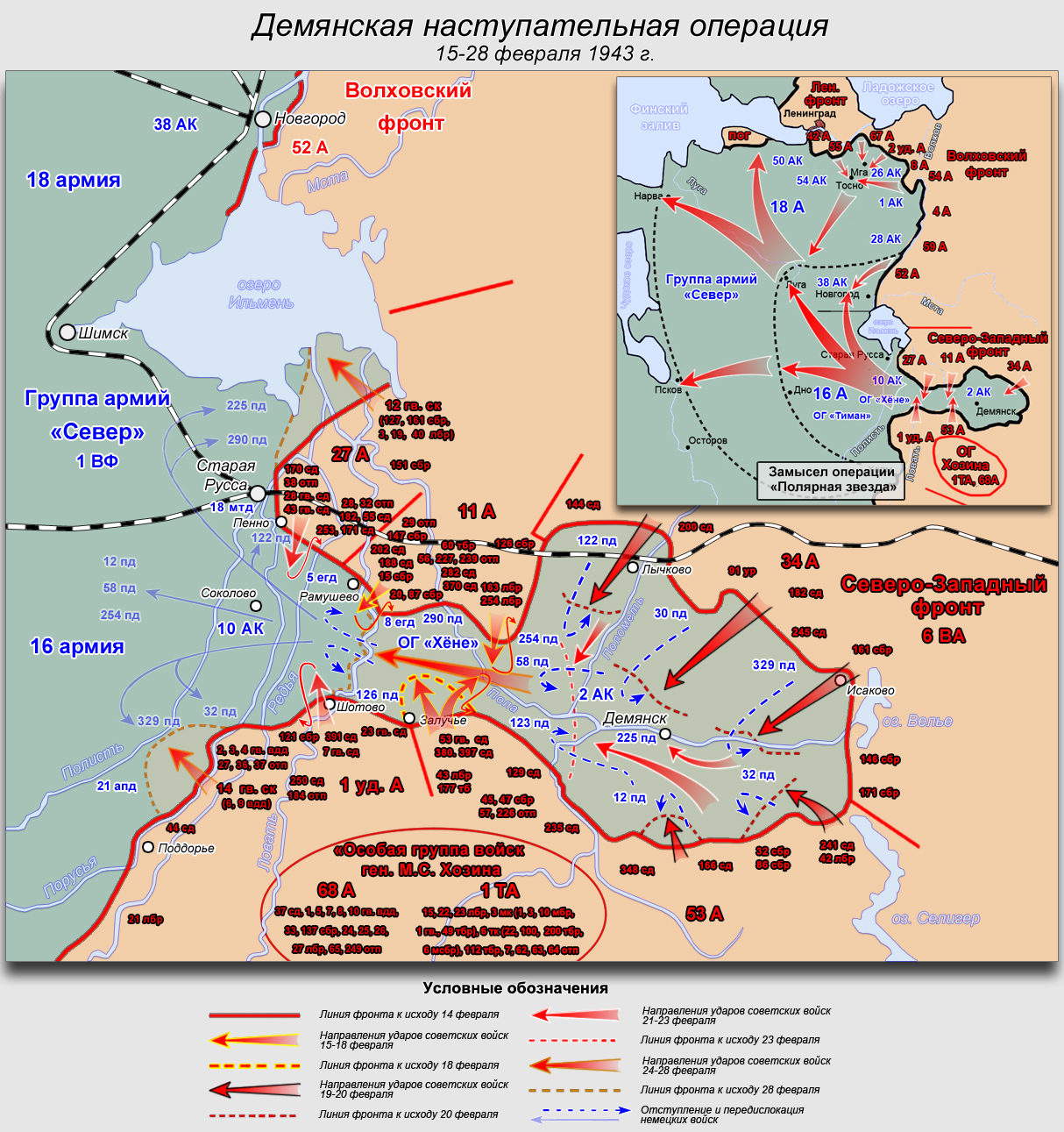
Demyansk Pocket, February 1943. Note position of the 170th northeast of Staraya Russa in 27th Army's sector.

Forces of this Front had isolated the II Army Corps of 16th Army in a pocket centered on Demyansk on February 25, but on April 21 a narrow corridor had been pushed through the village of Ramushevo from inside and out. Because the corridor was still under Soviet artillery fire it was not sufficient as a line of communications, and II Corps continued to rely on air supply for most of its needs through the remainder of the battle. Northwestern Front was under command of Lt. Gen. P. A. Kurochkin and at this time consisted of four Armies (1st Shock, 11th, 53rd and 34th). Maj. Gen. N. E. Berzarin was in command of the latter.

A first effort to cut the corridor was made in May by 1st Shock and 11th Armies, but this did not directly involve the 34th, which was positioned around the northeastern sector of the pocket. In June the 27th Army was added to the Front's forces, but a further effort to sever the corridor in July was unsuccessful. The STAVKA was now questioning the leadership of Kurochkin and Marshal Timoshenko was called on to supervise the next effort. During that month the 170th was reassigned to 11th Army. On July 24, Colonel Panchuk was removed from his command and replaced by Lt. Col. Stepan Ignatevich Ushakov, who would be promoted to the rank of colonel on September 4.

The 170th was one of six rifle divisions that made up the Army's shock group that attacked the corridor from the north, along with over 100 tanks, with the objective of linking up with 1st Shock to the south. The armies around the perimeter of the pocket, such as the 34th, were directed to make local attacks to tie down German reserves, but this cut into the logistic support for the main effort while producing no practical results. The offensive began on August 10, but there were only enough shells for a 10-minute artillery preparation, which was utterly inadequate against the strong German defenses. The shock groups of both Armies were shot to pieces after becoming enmeshed in obstacle belts, and in a week of fighting gained no more than a few hundred metres. By August 21 Kurochkin was obligated to call the offensive to a halt due to heavy casualties and low supplies of ammunition. A further assault in September fared much the same. Timoshenko reported on October 18 to the STAVKA on his plan for a new offensive in November:

The 11th Army's primary mission is to destroy the enemy in the sector between the Pola and Polomet Rivers by an attack from the Strelitsy, Gorby, Viazovka and Dedno (inclusive) line with the forces on the army's left wing and, after reaching the Rosino, Maslino, Kostkovo and Solovevo front on the northern and western banks of these rivers, complete the encirclement of the enemy's Demyansk grouping in close coordination with forces on the 1st Shock Army's right wing, which will be attacking from the south.

The 170th is specified in this plan as one of the three rifle divisions to be employed by 11th Army, along with three rifle brigades and a tank brigade. A prolonged thaw developed in November which delayed the regrouping and the actual offensive, which finally began early on November 28 and faltered almost immediately after it began.

Colonel Ushakov left his command on December 29, being replaced by Col. Fyodor Vasilevich Karlov, but this officer was in turn replaced on January 25, 1943, by Col. Sergei Ivanovich Aksyonov. In the same month, the 170th was reassigned to the 27th Army. While it was apparent that 16th Army's defenses in the salient were still formidable, the encirclement of German 6th Army at Stalingrad changed everything. Despite the Ramushevo corridor the fact was that II Corps continued to rely heavily on air supply, and every transport aircraft was now needed in the south. Finally, when it was too late to affect the outcome at Stalingrad, on January 31 Hitler authorized the evacuation of the Demyansk and Rzhev salients. In the wake of Operation Iskra, which broke the German land blockade of Leningrad in January, Marshal G. K. Zhukov conceived a plan to encircle and destroy Army Group North: Operation Polar Star. The first phase of the overall operation would be yet another attempt to cut off and eliminate the Demyansk salient. Zhukov finalized his plan during the week preceding the planned attack date of February 15, and the 11th and 27th Armies together had nine rifle divisions, including the 253rd, plus 150 tanks, massed between Penno and Ramushevo against the 5th Jäger Division, but the difficulties of logistics meant the 27th needed another week to redeploy. The piecemeal Soviet attacks were repulsed with heavy losses and Polar Star collapsed. Operation Ziethen began on February 17 before the delayed Soviet attack could get fully underway; Demyansk was abandoned on February 21 and by February 26 most of the corridor was evacuated as well.

On March 9, Colonel Aksyonov left the division, replaced by Col. Abram Mikhailovich Cheryak. In accordance with STAVKA Order No. 46079 issued at 0300 hours on March 20 the 170th is listed as one of seven rifle divisions and six rifle brigades to be removed from Northwestern Front along with 53rd Army and begin moving toward Livny. All of these formations were now in the Reserve of the Supreme High Command for much-needed rebuilding. By the beginning of June, the 170th was assigned to the Central Front in the Kursk salient. The division was assigned to Lt. Gen. P. L. Romanenko's 48th Army, and remained there for the duration, with the exception of a few months in early 1944.

== Battle of Kursk ==
When the German Zitadelle offensive began on July 5 the 48th Army was on the right flank of Central Front with seven rifle divisions defending a 38km-wide front from Droskovo to Stepanishchevo to Verkhnyaya Gnilusha to the 2nd Five-Year Plan Sovkhoz. Three divisions were in the first echelon with four, including the 170th, occupying the second defensive zone. It had the 2nd Antitank Brigade and three tank regiments in support, plus the 1168th Cannon Artillery Regiment and three self-propelled artillery regiments. While the possibility of the main German attack from the north striking 48th Army was anticipated it was considered more likely to come against 13th Army to its left. In the event the assault by German 9th Army followed the more likely path and 48th Army played little role in the defensive battle. By July 15 the German forces had been fought to a standstill and the 48th, 13th, 70th, and 2nd Tank Armies were prepared to go over to the counteroffensive against the German grouping in the Oryol salient.

=== Operation Kutuzov ===
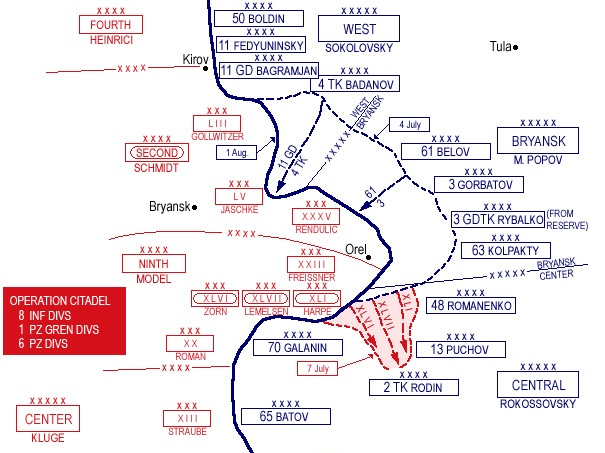
Map of Operation Kutuzov. Note position of 48th Army.

48th Army was ordered to attack with its left flank 42nd Rifle Corps along the sector Sondrovka–outside Krasnaya Slobodka in the direction of Yasnaya Polyana and Shamshin and by the end of July 17 to reach a line from Nagornyi to Shamshin, after which it was to develop the offensive toward Zmiyovka. At 0600 hours on July 15, following a 15-minute artillery fire onslaught, Central Front went over to the attack. Despite stubborn resistance, by 0800 Soviet forces had penetrated up to 2–3km on some sectors; 42nd Corps made considerable progress toward Kunach. The advance continued over the next week despite the defenders making good use of terrain and pre-existing defenses and after forcing the Neruch River on July 22 the right flank forces of 48th Army liberated the town of Bogodukhov on July 24 while its center and left flank reached a line from Glazunovka to Gremyachevo. Following this the Army sped up its advance to the northwest from the line of the Zmievka–Ponyri railroad.

During this advance, on July 27–29 Starshina Georgii Maksimovich Kudashov, a platoon commander of the 3rd Machine Gun Company of 391st Rifle Regiment, distinguished himself in the fighting for the village of Filosovo. Breaking in with a group of soldiers he soon found his group was surrounded. Kudashov organized a perimeter defense and, for two days, repelled all attacks despite being wounded twice, including the loss of his left eye. As relief was arriving from his battalion he personally destroyed a German firing point from the rear. On January 15, 1944, he was made a Hero of the Soviet Union. His injury made it impossible to return to the front, so he was employed on the railway system, where he had worked before the war. He entered the reserve in 1945 with the rank of lieutenant and moved back to Shepetivka, where he had lived pre-war. He died there in 2007 at the age of 88.

By this time Oryol was in danger of being encircled by the forces of Central and Bryansk Fronts and 9th Army was making preparations to evacuate it even as resistance at the front remained stubborn. Romanenko now ordered his Army in the general direction of Nesterovo and in an energetic advance it covered more than 60km by August 1, reaching a line from Ploskoe to Gutorovo and capturing both villages. On August 3, German sappers began demolition work within the city. The following morning elements of 63rd Army broke into Oryol and street fighting began; this continued until dawn on August 5. 9th Army now began falling back to the west to take up positions at the base of the diminishing salient. The right wing forces of 48th Army took Kromy on August 6 and five days later reached a line from Mytskoe to outside Dmitrovsk-Orlovsky. By August 18 the Soviet forces reached the Hagen position and the Oryol salient had been cleared.

== Into Ukraine and Belarus ==
Central Front struck German 2nd Army's center at Sevsk and east flank at Klintsy on August 26. The Front's forces quickly broke the German line with 60th Army in the lead. On September 2 the XIII Army Corps was ordered to fall back to the west and maintain contact with Army Group South, but instead was pushed south across the Seym River into the 4th Panzer Army sector, thereby opening a 30km wide gap between Army Groups South and Center. The following day, 2nd Army withdrew to the Desna River as the Front commander, Army Gen. K. K. Rokossovskii, paused to regroup. On September 9 the Front's forces forced this river south of Novhorod-Siverskyi and at Otsekin.

Central Front liberated Nizhyn on the Oster River on September 15, which finally triggered the OKH to order a full withdrawal to the Dniepr. Over the next five days the Front staged a two-pronged thrust northward on either side of Chernihiv which collapsed the flank of 2nd Army, allowing it to advance north toward Gomel.

=== Gomel-Rechytsa Offensive ===
48th Army closed up to the German defenses at Gomel from the east and south on September 29–30. Romanenko arrayed his five divisions under direct Army command in an arc extending from Dobrush along the Iput River for some 25km to where it entered the Sozh River. The Army largely faced the XXXV Army Corps. During the first two weeks of October, Rokossovskii launched his first attempt to seize Gomel and advance on Rechytsa, but this was unsuccessful. For the second attempt he called for the formation of three shock groups on Central Front's right wing (48th, 65th and 61st Armies). These were to attack on October 15 in the direction of Babruysk and Minsk. The first of these included seven divisions from 48th Army and four from 65th Army. Three divisions (102nd, 194th, and 307th), were moved into a bridgehead over the Sozh south of Gomel while the 170th, 137th and 175th took over their former sectors. In the event, this effort made little more progress than the first attempt.

On October 20, Central Front was redesignated as Belorussian Front, and at about the same time the 170th was subordinated to 42nd Corps. Two days later Colonel Chervyak left the division and was replaced by Col. Semyon Grigorovich Tsiplenkov, deputy commander of the 399th Rifle Division.

Rokossovskii planned for a renewed offensive to begin on November 10. Over the first ten days of the month the Front carried out another regrouping to continue the offensive and encircle and destroy the German Rechytsa-Gomel grouping. He ordered the 175th, 102nd and 73rd Rifle Divisions into the bridgehead between the Dniepr and Sozh while the 42nd Corps was moved to a bridgehead over the Dniepr south of Loyew where it was backed up by two other divisions in the Corps' second echelon. In three days of fighting the forces of 48th and 65th Armies managed to tear a gap 15km wide and from 8–12km deep in the German defenses, and were halfway to Rechytsa. Over the next four days XXXV Corps was driven back into the city, and on November 18 the German forces evacuated it, crossing to the east bank of the Dniepr. The division was one of several Red Army units granted honorifics for this victory:

RECHITSA – ...170th Rifle Division (Col. Tsiplenkov, Semyon Grigorovich)... The troops that participated in the liberation of Rechitsa, by order of the Supreme Commander-in-Chief of 18 November 1943 and a commendation in Moscow, are given a salute of 12 artillery salvoes by 124 guns.

Army Group Center's southern defenses were in a state of crisis by this point, and 9th Army had been forced out of Gomel. Along with a small group from 1st Guards Tank Corps the 48th joined the advance of 11th and 63rd Armies, which were pursuing the XXXV Corps as it withdrew from Gomel. By November 30 the combined armies had pushed the Corps westward and northwestward to the Klenovichi–Potapovka line, 25km southeast of Zhlobin.

=== Parichi-Bobruisk Offensive ===
For Rokossovskii's next attempt to reach Parichi and Babruysk General Romanenko formed a shock group with his 42nd and 29th Rifle Corps with armor support and it was to launch its attack in the 15km-wide sector from Shatsilki on the Berezina southwest to Zherd Station on the Shatsilki–Kalinkavichy rail line, facing elements of XXXXI Panzer. This was to begin on January 16, 1944, and was to reach a line from Oktyabirskii to Parichi by the end of the month, after which 48th and 65th Armies were to exploit to Babruysk. 42nd Corps' immediate objectives were the villages of Zareche and Sosnovka roughly 15km behind the front, so it attacked in a two-echelon formation to sustain its drive across the Zherdianka River and beyond. This required a regrouping in which the 194th Rifle Division provided cover for the 175th Division to move into first echelon and the 399th Division to move into second. The 170th was to be introduced once a penetration had been achieved.

From the beginning the 194th and 175th struggled to penetrate the German forward defenses. On January 19 the 73rd and 170th were committed to reinforce the assault. Tsiplenkov's troops passed through the 399th early the next day and attacked a strongpoint at Medved, 4km southwest of Pechishche. The weight of four rifle divisions gave the defenders of this latter place no choice but to withdraw, which took place late in the day, followed by a close pursuit. The advance of 42nd Corps was finally halted by the German 36th Infantry Division at Sosnovka and the large swath of swampy terrain that extended nearly 10km to its west. However, the 36th had given up considerable ground. Before the operation entered its second phase, the 170th was removed from 42nd Corps and came under Romanenko's direct command.

This phase began on February 2. Rokossovskii intended Romanenko's Army, which had been heavily reinforced and would be supported on the left by 65th Army's 95th Rifle Corps, to smash the defenses of 9th Army in the Dubrova area and advance northwest in the direction of Parichi and Babruysk. The Army's shock group would consist of the 25th and 53rd Rifle Corps and these would assault the positions of 36th and 134th Infantry Divisions. Once the penetration was achieved the 1st Guards Tanks would be introduced to lead the exploitation and, if necessary, the 170th and the 42nd Corps. Dubrova was cleared by 96th Rifle Division on the first day and the advance covered some 4km by February 5, but came under repeated counterattacks by infantry and tanks and Romanenko was ordered to go over to the defense the next day. By the time it was renewed on February 14 the 170th had returned to 42nd Corps. Again the attackers made initial gains of about 2km before being halted by reinforcements. Romanenko's next effort took place east and west of Iazvin beginning on February 22. He concentrated 42nd and 29th Corps backed by elements of 1st Guards Tanks. This amounted to eight understrength divisions supported by roughly 70 tanks, which penetrated the defense and pushed forward some 4km to the northwest; in three more days of heavy fighting another 5km were gained. The battle died out by February 25 due to mutual exhaustion. Belorussian Front was renamed 1st Belorussian during this month.

In the last week of March Rokossovskii set out to eliminate the remaining German bridgeheads on the east bank of the Dniepr. One of these was held by elements of 9th Army between Bykhaw and Chavusy and was to be attacked by the Front's 10th and 50th Armies, backed by 1st Guards Tanks, starting on March 25. In preparation for this ambitious offensive 42nd Corps was transferred to the 50th. This Army was to penetrate the defenses of German 4th Army's XII Army Corps on a 10km-wide front east of Bykhaw. The shock group would consist of the 121st Rifle Corps and part of 46th Rifle Corps with the objective of reaching the southern approaches of Mogilev by the end of April 1. 42nd Corps was to reinforce this exploitation once it completed its redeployment around March 30. In the event, in five days of heavy fighting the shock group managed to gain only 3km at the most, and 42nd Corps could do little to help.

In mid-April 1st Belorussian Front went over to the defense to prepare for the summer offensive. At about the same time the 170th and its Corps was transferred to 3rd Army, still in the same Front, but returned to 48th Army prior to the start of Operation Bagration.

== Operation Bagration ==
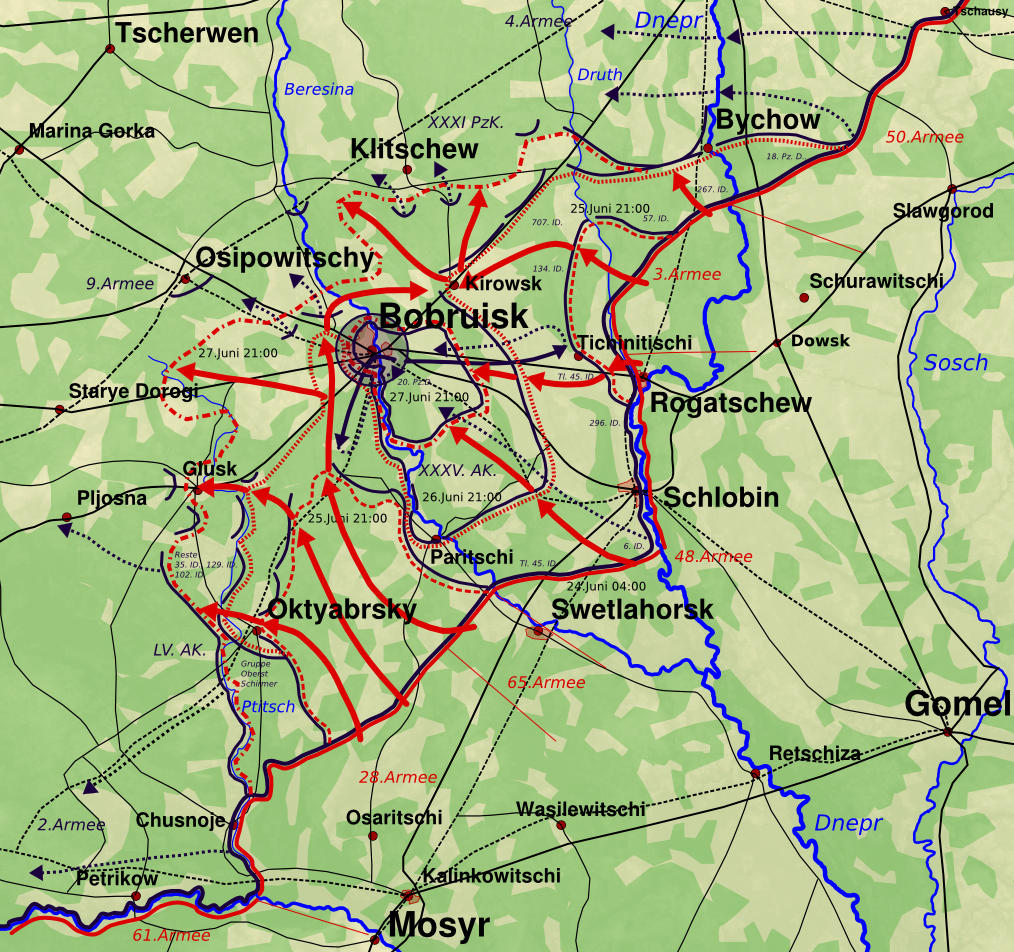
Babruysk operation. Note thrust of 48th Army's shock group north of Rahachow.

At the start of the offensive 42nd Corps was concentrated north of Rahachow to form the Army's shock group with 29th Corps, heavily backed by artillery and armor. The 7km-wide attack sector ran from Kostyashevo to Kolosy. 42nd Corps specifically was to attack on a 1,000m front just north of the former and develop its attack in the direction of Koshary, and was tasked with capturing bridgeheads on the west bank of the Dobysna River, using forward detachments, by the end of the second day. The shock group would then advance in the direction of Repki, Turki, and Babruysk, complete breaking the German defense, and then reach the rear of the three divisions in and around Zhlobin, cut them off from the crossings of the Berezina, and destroy them in cooperation with 65th Army. At the same time, the Army would seize crossings south of Babruysk and take the city with an attack from the south. Following this the offensive would be developed in the direction of Asipovichy and Pukhavichy. Romanenko deployed his Army in a single echelon. The Front's artillery preparation would last two hours and five minutes, and 42nd Corps would have support from the 22nd Breakthrough Artillery Division. Before the offensive, the division numbered 5,582 personnel, fielding 2,614 rifles, 1,539 submachine guns, 241 light and 67 medium machine guns. It was supplied with from 2.0 to 3.3 combat loads of ammunition for each weapon, from rifle rounds to artillery shells.

=== Babruysk Offensive ===
In the last days before the offensive a reconnaissance in force was carried out along the entire Front's 761km sector, even though its left wing armies would not be initially involved. The right wing armies, including the 48th, made their reconnaissance on the night of June 22/23 with 12 detachments roughly the size of a reinforced rifle battalion, although that of the 48th also contained two penal companies. This attacked following a 10-minute artillery preparation but had no success in seizing German positions, which were being stubbornly held. The main artillery preparation on the morning of June 24 was relatively ineffective on the breakthrough sector of the 48th and 3rd Armies, largely due to the distance from the firing positions to the forward defenses, 5–6km or more. As well, poor weather limited air support. The shock groups of the two Armies attempted to break the defense on a 15km sector from Ozerane to Kolosy. 42nd and 29th Corps had great difficulty in developing the offensive in part due to terrain; the broad and swampy valley of the Drut River was difficult to cross, especially by tanks and other heavy vehicles. Accurate German artillery and mortar fire on the approaches to the crossing points also caused trouble. Only after two hours of heavy fighting was the river line forced and the first trench line taken. The second line was captured by 1100 hours and the battle moved on to the third line, continuing without success until evening. Altogether, the two shock groups had penetrated 2.5–3.5km on a 20km front.

The offensive continued the next morning with a 45-minute artillery preparation, now supported by aviation, before the shock group went over to the attack at 1000 hours. Intensive fighting continued through the day, finally clearing the main defensive zone before closing up to the second zone, completing an advance of 5-10km. Getting the artillery over the Drut caused considerable delay. Tsiplenkov was wounded during the June 25 fighting with division deputy commander Col. Anton Mikhailovich Puzyrevskii taking command. June 26 saw the completion of the breakthrough as 3rd and 48th Armies cleared the final defensive line. At 0400 hours, following a short but powerful preparation, the latter resumed the attack and by 1300 had forced the Dniepr and captured Zhlobin, a linchpin of the defense. By 2000 the shock group had reached the German intermediate position along the Dobysna River and forced it off the march. In three days the shock group had advanced from 10-23km from its jumping-off positions. 46th Rifle and 9th Tank Corps were both committed from 3rd Army's reserve to exploit toward Babruysk and north of that place. Air reconnaissance revealed large columns of vehicles and equipment moving west.

Maj. Fyodor Ivanovich Ulyanin, a battalion commander in the 422nd Rifle Regiment, distinguished himself in the crossing of the Dobysna sufficiently to be made a Hero of the Soviet Union. He had first made a secret crossing of the Drut on the night of June 24/25 with the permission of his regimental commander. As soon as the artillery preparation ended his men surged forward, overrunning trenches, and occupied height 147.1 which dominated the surrounding terrain. After driving off several counterattacks he led his battalion forward to capture two key villages. The advance halted at the Dobysna until Ulyanin organized a crossing under heavy fire which seized a bridgehead. This came under counterattack by superior forces, but he led the defense by his personal example. When ammunition supply became critical he ordered his men to refrain from firing until point-blank range, also using grenades. This produced confusion in the German ranks, and Ulyanin left his trench to urge his men forward as their opponents fell back in retreat. He was then fatally struck by a shell fragment, but refused evacuation and continued to lead until he lost consciousness. On August 23 he was posthumously awarded the Gold Star.

During June 27 the 48th, 3rd and 65th Armies advanced without much opposition to both encircle Babruysk and eliminate the three isolated German divisions that had been in the Zhlobin–Rahachow area. Elements of the 48th were working in cooperation with the Dniepr Flotilla operating along the Berezina, and by the end of the day the Army it was fighting the encircled grouping on a line from Barak to outside Malinova to Kavali to Malevo. In the morning, mobile units of 65th Army cut all the roads from Babruysk to the west and northwest, while its 105th Rifle Corps cut the paved road to Hlusk and 1st Guards Tanks broke into the northern and northwestern outskirts. During the day the encircled grouping prepared for a breakout to the north as it had no prospect of reaching Babruysk; artillery and other equipment was destroyed, as were livestock and other supplies. At 1900 hours the pocket came under attack from 526 aircraft of 16th Air Army. The destruction caused by bombing and strafing led to panic, vehicle collisions, and massive traffic jams. At 2015, supported by armor and artillery, 48th Army went over to the attack along its entire front. While the German units closest to the front line, which had suffered less from the air assault, put up stiff resistance, other groups and individuals that had been more directly affected began to surrender. Rokossovskii entrusted Romanenko with the final liquidation of this grouping.

Fighting went on through the night of June 27/28 and the morning as the remaining organized German forces continued to attempt to break out to the north. The left flank forces of 3rd Army beat off 15 heavy attacks in up to divisional strength. Meanwhile, 48th Army was launching powerful concentric attacks with the 42nd Corps operating from the east toward Savichy and the 29th and 53rd Corps drove from the southeast toward Dubovka. During the night the pocket was split in two, and with all hope of escape gone German troops began surrendering in groups of 100-250 men, led by their officers. Only a small fraction attempted to evade captivity. By 1300 hours the fighting had effectively ceased; 48th Army reached the Berezina while leaving detachments to mop up. In recognition for its part in this victory, on July 2 the 170th would be awarded the Order of Suvorov, 2nd Degree.

By 0200 hours on June 29 the division was withdrawn from the fight and placed in the second echelon of the corps. On the night of June 29/30 the division marched through Sabichi, Titovka and Yеloviki and by 2000 concentrated in the forest 2km west of Yeloviki, where it put its units in order and brought up ammunition in readiness for further action. On June 30 the division had a strength of 4,669 officers and men, with 798 mobilized from liberated areas and 300 replacements arriving. On July 1 Colonel Puzyrevskii returned to his deputy command and Col. Vasilii Ivanovich Matronin took over. During the day, the division continued to put its units in order and combed through the forests searching for remaining German troops, taking 204 prisoners including 50 Hiwis. During the following days the division marched in the second echelon of the corps, putting its units in order, bringing up ammunition and rear units, and conducted sweeps of the surrounding forests for German stragglers. At 0400 on July 9 the division came under air attack, suffering casualties of one killed and 12 wounded, in addition to the loss of 13 horses. Two days later, an airstrike against the vanguard 391st Rifle Regiment killed regimental deputy commander Major Andrey Ivanovich Shcherbina and wounded division deputy commander Puzyrevskii. In total, from July 1 to 11 the division lost two killed and eighteen wounded, while capturing a total of 322 German soldiers.

=== Minsk Offensive ===
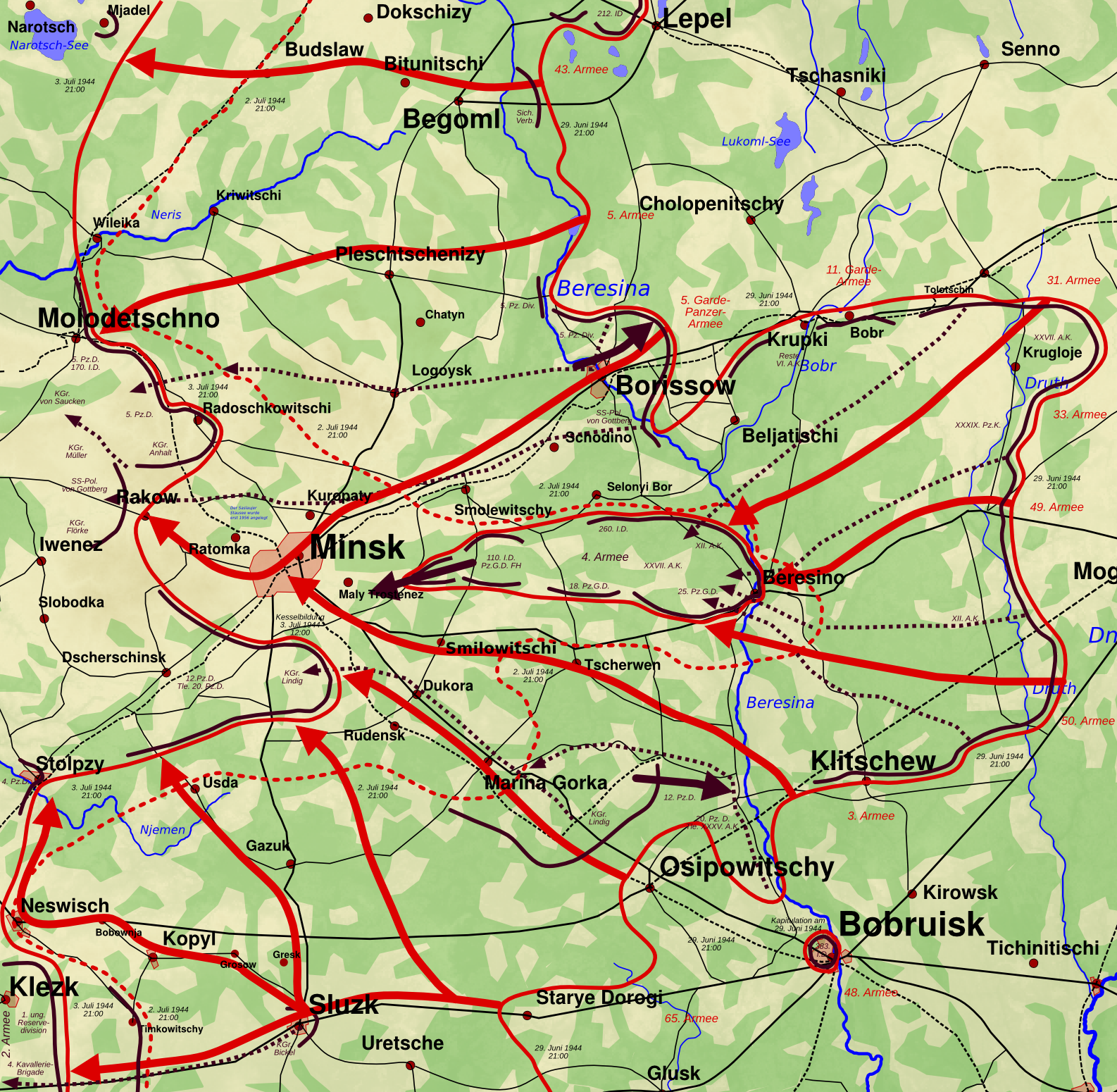
Minsk Offensive

Babruysk had a nominal garrison of 10,000 men but remnants of nearly every division of 9th Army had taken refuge there. Fighting was building by building and block by block, but overnight on June 28/29 the remaining defenders largely gathered in the north and northwest to attempt a breakout. This grouping managed to break through the defenses of 105th Corps' 356th Rifle Division with heavy losses, but the escapees were largely re-encircled later. By 1000 hours the lead divisions of 42nd Corps and 105th Corps met and completely captured the city. In all it took 42nd Corps, 105th Corps, and two corps of 3rd Army about three days to mop up all the escapees from Babruysk, which slowed the development of the offensive toward Minsk and Baranavichy. The 29th and 53rd Corps took up the pursuit toward Asipovichy and Pukhavichy, while 42nd Corps completed its part in the mopping up in the Solomenka area on July 1.

At 2300 hours on July 2, Rokossovskii issued an order to 1st Guards and 9th Tank Corps, and an hour later to 3rd and 48th Armies, to advance on a 24-hour basis to liberate Minsk. 1st Guards broke into the city's southeastern outskirts at 1300 on July 3 and linked up 3rd Belorussian Front's 2nd Guards Tank Corps, completing the encirclement. 48th Army supported this advance from the south. Now it was directed to reach the line Negoreloe–Logvishche–Mogilno–Nesvizh–Golynka by the end of July 4. This was a redirection from the northwest to the west. It was unable to fully reach this line due to swampy and forested terrain and poor roads.

=== Lublin-Brest Offensive ===
The right wing armies of 1st Belorussian Front (48th, 65th and 28th) were now given the task of developing the offensive to the southwest, in the direction of Baranavichy and Brest. The line from Slonim to Pinsk was to be taken no later than July 10-12 and the armies were to subsequently take Brest while also seizing bridgeheads on the west bank of the Western Bug River. The Front's left wing armies, largely inactive to this point, would join the offensive. By July 5 the remnants of organized German forces had fallen back to a defense line that had been constructed during WWI from Daugavpils to Maladzyechna to Baranavichy, but this was understandably in a poor state of repair. Under the favorable circumstances the Soviet forces carried on the operation without and real break. The German forces put up a stubborn defense of the latter place to cover the withdrawal of a grouping from Polesye. The attack by 48th and 65th Armies, backed by 4th Guards Cavalry and 1st Mechanized Corps, developed slowly and it wasn't until July 7 that they were able to break into the town following a powerful artillery and aviation preparation. Baranavichy was completely cleared the next day, and the Soviet forces occupied Luninyets on July 10, with Pinsk falling four days later.

On July 12 the 42nd Rifle Corps was released from second echelon and ran into sustained resistance from remnants of the 28th Jäger Division and 4th Panzer Division, defending a line along the western bank of the Zelvyanka. The 391st Rifle Regiment went into action at midnight on July 11/12, conducting a night reconnaissance of the German positions and forcing a crossing of the river, but without further success. At 1900 on July 12, with artillery support and in cooperation with its Corps-mate 137th Division, a crossing of the Zelvyanka was forced and the settlement of Ivashkovichi taken, with the 391st continuing the pursuit towards Sudzevichi. The opposing German troops attempted to hold the Rudzevichi–Terekhovichi line on the next day, but the 391st and 717th Regiments broke their resistance on the eastern slopes on the hills west of Ivashkovichi and Kosheli and by 0400 on July 13 reached the line of Patski and Dobroseltsy. During the fighting on July 12-13 the 294th Artillery Regiment commander Lt. Col. Boris Ilyich Krivopishin was seriously wounded, while the 170th suffered casualties of 15 killed and 73 wounded.

Between June 24 and July 20, the division suffered casualties of 163 killed, 1,743 wounded, and 65 sick. In the same period, 2,218 German soldiers were taken prisoner, while trophies included 30 tanks and self-propelled guns, 170 guns, 96 mortars, 1,351 vehicles, and 1,633 horses. On the latter date Colonel Tsyplenkov returned to his command, where he would remain into the postwar. The right flank armies of the Front had by now occupied Kobryn, were approaching the Western Bug and had outflanked Brest from the northeast. The Brest garrison had been ordered to hold at all costs, and a counterattack force had been gathered to retake Kobryn. The fighting with this grouping continued through July 23-27 before it was defeated and the river was reached. Brest was now enveloped on two sides, and it fell to combined forces of 28th, 61st and 70th Armies on July 28. The advance now shifted to the Warsaw axis as German resistance increased, and this, combined with logistic constraints, brought the offensive to a halt, generally along the line of the Vistula.

== Into Poland and East Prussia ==
Тhe 170th was withdrawn to the 48th Army reserve on August 7 for rebuilding and concentrated in the vicinity of the settlement of Załuskie Koronne. In reserve, the division conducted training and received replacements. While conducting a training exercise involving a simulated crossing of the Western Bug on August 25, troops of the 717th Rifle Regiment downed an overflying Messerschmitt Bf 109 with salvo fire near Rytele Suche. The division returned to the 42nd Rifle Corps on September 18, taking defensive positions north of the Narew on the line of Napiórki, Ladne, Grabnik, and Yavoren relieving the 194th, 137th, and 399th Divisions. At this time the army was transferred to the 2nd Belorussian Front, which was now under command of Marshal Rokossovskii. The division numbered 6,611 officers and men on September 26. Its transport included 1,230 horses and 125 trucks. Infantry weapons included 3,153 rifles, 1,369 submachine guns, 236 light machine guns, 65 medium machine guns, 18 DShK heavy machine guns, and 155 anti-tank rifles. Division artillery included 12 122mm howitzers, 25 76mm divisional guns, 11 76mm regimental guns, 25 45mm antitank guns, 16 120mm mortars, 55 82mm mortars, and 37 50mm mortars.

In October the division was moved to 29th Corps, but returned to 42nd Corps in November. In preparation for the Vistula-Oder offensive 48th Army was moved into the bridgehead over the Narew at Różan. It was tasked with launching the Front's main attack in conjunction with 2nd Shock Army on a 6km front with the immediate goal of reaching Mława. The Corps was deployed along the sector from the Army's right boundary line as far as the Orzyc River and had two divisions in the first echelon. The Corps had been reinforced with the 35th Howitzer Brigade, 16th Guards Howitzer Regiment, 18th Mortar Brigade (all of 15th Artillery Division), and the 286th Mortar Regiment.

=== Vistula-Oder Offensive ===
On the first day of the offensive, January 14, the Army's forces advanced 3-6km against stubborn resistance and reached the approaches to Maków, which was taken the next day. A further gain of up to 10km was made on January 16, aided by clearing weather which allowed greater air support. While 48th Army covered another 16km the following day, the 8th Mechanized Corps, which was exploiting through the Army's breakthrough, captured the outer ring of the Mława fortified area. On the 17th the 5th Guards Tank Army deployed southwest of Maków and before long passed through the combat formations of 53rd Corps and attacked the 7th and 299th Infantry Divisions from the march. These divisions had been reinforced with 20 tanks and assault guns and put up stiff resistance before their positions were broken through. The next day 5th Guards Tanks completed the blockade of Mława and by the evening elements of 48th Army reached its outskirts. The German garrison, consisting of remnants of the 7th and 299th Divisions and the 30th Panzergrenadier Regiment, contested the major brick structures and a series of concrete pillboxes, but despite this units of 42nd Corps soon broke into the town. Heavy fighting continued overnight and by morning the garrison had been destroyed with its remnants taken prisoner while the 29th Corps stormed the important road junction and strongpoint of Przasnysz, allowing Marshal Rokossovskii to commit his 3rd Guards Cavalry Corps.

The 48th and 2nd Shock Armies now took up the pursuit northward toward the Frisches Haff, advancing as much as 30km and reaching a line from Działdowo to Bieżuń by day's end. On January 26 the 29th and 53rd Corps were fighting along the approaches to Guttstadt and had captured Wormditt while the 42nd Corps assisted 5th Guards Tanks in capturing the towns of Tolkemit and Mühlhausen, severing land communications to the Germans' East Prussian group of forces. In recognition of this victory the 391st Rifle Regiment (Lt. Colonel Boris Vasilevich Bersenev) was given the battle honor "Marienburg"; on April 5 the 170th as a whole would be awarded the Order of the Red Banner, and the 717th Rifle Regiment won the Order of Suvorov, 3rd Degree, for the capture of these several objectives. 48th Army now turned its front to the northeast to securely close this group's escape route. German attacks to restore communications began almost immediately and 42nd Corps was attached to 5th Guards Tanks in support. By January 30 the escape attempts had been beaten off and 5th Guards Tanks began advancing, reaching the Passarge River and fighting for Frauenburg.

=== East Prussian Offensives ===
On February 11 the 48th Army was transferred to 3rd Belorussian Front; 42nd Corps now had just the 170th and 137th Divisions under command. This Front was responsible for eliminating the remaining German forces in East Prussia. By this time the Army's divisions, on average, did not exceed 3,500 personnel and it had only 85 tanks and self-propelled guns on strength. During late February and early March the Front prepared for a new offensive. 48th Army was to remain on the defensive against any further breakout attempts while the remainder of the Front advanced on Königsberg. It was to maintain a strong antitank defense in the direction of Braunsberg and also along the highway to Elbing. The offensive began at 1100 hours on March 13 following a 40-minute artillery preparation and the German defenses were broken into despite fierce resistance. On the night of March 15/16 the division handed over its sector of the offensive to the 152nd Fortified Region and concentrated in the corps' second echelon in the vicinity of Marienau, Klein Mausdorf and Kmiecin. The 391st Rifle Regiment briefly took over a defensive sector to the northwest on 17/18 March but on the next night handed over its positions and returned to Klein Mausdorf. The division relieved the 137th Rifle Division on the night of 23/24 March, taking over a defensive sector near Petershagen, which it handed over to elements of the 137th and 399th Divisions on the night of 29/30 March. This regrouping reduced the division's frontage to a regimental strip on the south bank of the Frisches Haff and the mouth of the Nogat.

Braunsberg was captured on March 20. Three subunits of the 170th received rewards on April 26 for their parts in the elimination of German forces that had been trapped in the Heiligenbeil Pocket: the 391st Rifle Regiment was awarded the Order of Suvorov, 3rd Degree; the 294th Artillery Regiment won the Order of Kutuzov, 3rd Degree; and the 182nd Sapper Battalion got the Order of the Red Star. On March 25 the Army advanced up to 6km and captured the towns of Rossen and Runenberg. At this point it went over to the defensive and remained so until the first days of May when it took part in attacks along the Baltic coast. Throughout April the 391st Rifle Regiment held the division's sector, observing and conducting reconnaissance of the opposing German positions, held by the 61st Infantry Regiment of the 7th Infantry Division with occasional operations to take prisoners on the opposite bank, while the division conducted training in preparation for the anticipated crossing of the mouth of the Nogat. On the night of 24/25 April the foot reconnaissance platoon of the 422nd Rifle Regiment and the 192nd Separate Penal Company conducted a reconnaissance in force, probing the opposing defenses by establishing a bridgehead on the west bank of the mouth of the Nogat. The German counterattack with an estimated battalion-strength force, supported by four self-propelled guns and artillery fire, drove the reconnaissance group back across the mouth of the Nogat in three hours. The reconnaissance force lost 30 killed, 85 wounded, and 43 missing, while three prisoners of war were captured together with five machine guns, three 82 mm mortars, and three anti-aircraft guns.

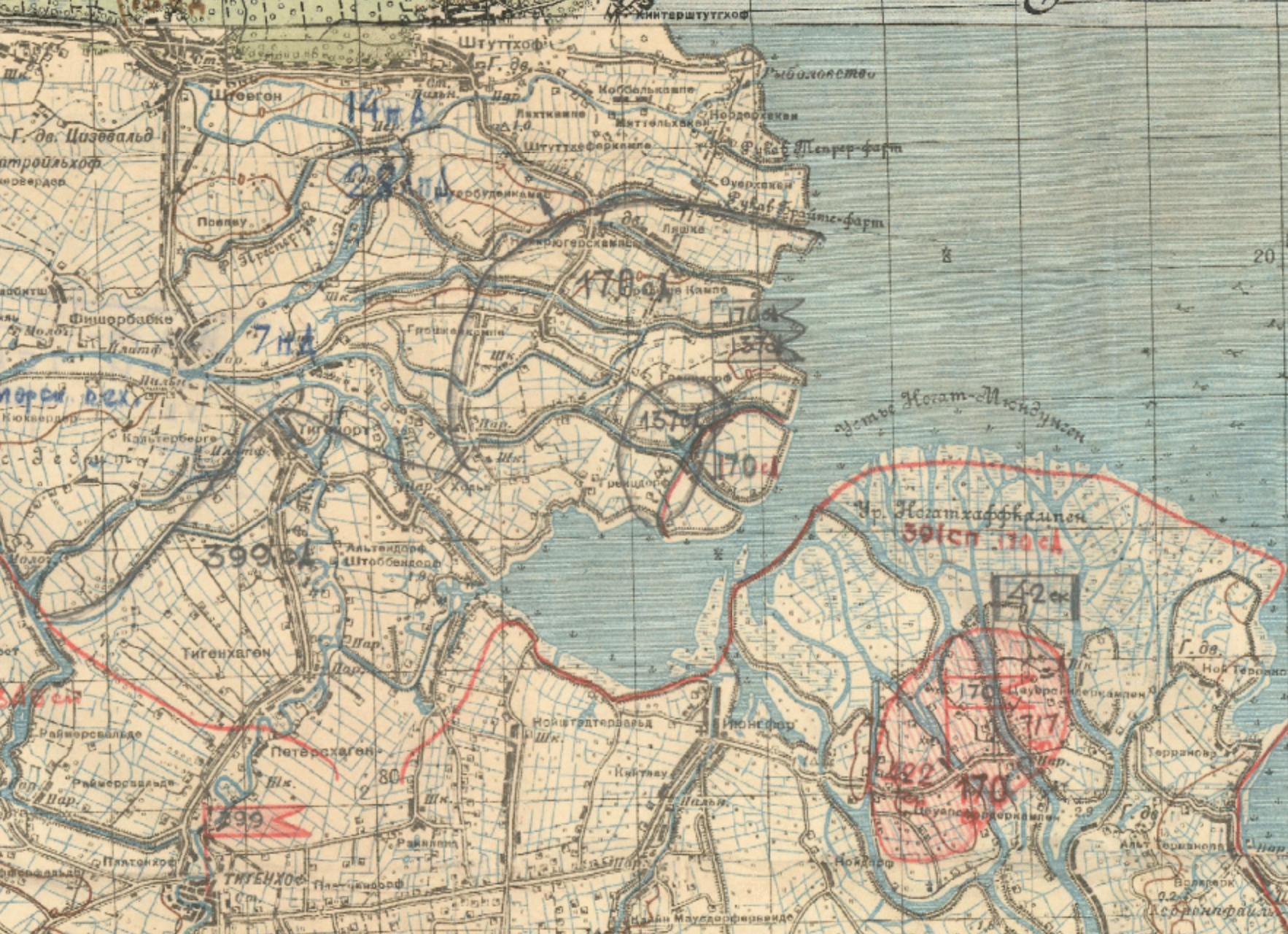
Positions of the 170th Rifle Division on 7 May (red line) and 8 May (black line)

Before the crossing operation, the 422nd Rifle Regiment, with the attached 192nd and 172nd Separate Penal Companies, took jumping-off positions on the night of 6/7 May. After an hourlong artillery bombardment, the 3rd Rifle Battalion of the 422nd and the 172nd Penal Company forced a crossing of the mouth of the Nogat at 1100 on 7 May under strong artillery and machine gun fire, breaking through the German defenses consisting of concrete pillboxes, barbed wire, and minefields. The attack secured a bridgehead of five kilometers with a depth of 2–3 kilometers, which came under repeated counterattacks throughout the day. At 0500 on 8 May, after the commitment of the 717th Rifle Regiment and a battalion of the 391st, elements of the division dislodged German troops from their line and continued to drive them north, capturing a series of settlements and farms. By 2000 the 422nd and 717th reached the line of the Königsberger Weichsel (Wisła Królewiecka). Continuing the offensive, the 717th forced a crossing of the Königsberger Weichsel, capturing the dominating height 1.1. At 2230, a German force estimated at up to 300 troops, supported by four to five self propelled guns, launched two fruitless counterattacks against the 717th, endeavoring to drive the regiment back across the Königsberger Weichsel. In the final two days of the war, the division suffered casualties of 32 killed and 56 wounded.

== Postwar ==
At the end of the war the men and women of the division carried the full title 170th Rifle, Rechytsa, Order of the Red Banner, Order of Suvorov Division. (Russian: 170-я стрелковая Речицкая Краснознамённая ордена Суворова дивизия.) Following the German capitulation on May 9, elements of the opposing 7th Infantry Division surrendered to the 170th. These included division commander general Fritz-Georg von Rappard, six senior officers, 148 other officers, and 6,736 non-commissioned officers and soldiers. As trophies the 170th took 5,000 rifles, 250 machine guns, 90 mortars, twelve tanks and self-propelled guns, 350 vehicles, 1,370 horses, 700 cows, 150 pigs, and seven depots with materiel. At the same time the division liberated Stutthof concentration camp. The 170th ended the war with a strength of 4,298 officers and men.

On May 12 the division marched through Grosskenkampe, Haffkrug, Lange, Pugkampe, Alt-Terranova, Bolberk, Gross Rebern, and Elbing, and by 2200 hours that day concentrated northeast of the latter with its headquarters in the village of Damerau. Its troops transitioned to a routine of peacetime training, and a picked contingent from the division formed part of the front's representatives at the Moscow Victory Parade. The first party of older troops slated for demobilization was dispatched on July 11, and during late July and early August elements of the division took part in the gathering of the grain harvest in the area of Preussisch Holland. The process of drawing down the division began in early August with the dispatch of more than 800 troops as well as the divisional training battalion to Königsberg, where they were used to strengthen other units of the Special Military District. After a two-day march, the division arrived at its final concentration area near Gutenfeld, southeast of Königsberg, on August 13. The 170th was disbanded between August 14 and 20, 1945, with its personnel being used to strengthen the 1st Tank Division and other units of the district.
