= Tuja =

Tuja may refer to:

- Tuja (river), a river in Poland
- Tuja, Gmina Nowy Dwór Gdański, a village in Poland
- KTRI Tuja, a Polish military vehicle

== See also ==
- Tuja-Stadion, a stadium in Germany
- Thuja, a genus of trees
