= Różewo, Pomeranian Voivodeship =

Różewo
- Village
- Location within Poland
- Coordinates: 54°11′58″N 19°10′46″E
- Country: Poland
- Voivodeship: Pomeranian
- County: Nowy Dwór
- Gmina: Nowy Dwór Gdański
- Population: 90

Różewo ([ruˈʐɛvɔ]; German: Fürstenauerweide) is a village in the administrative district of Gmina Nowy Dwór Gdański, within Nowy Dwór County, Pomeranian Voivodeship, in northern Poland.

== See also ==
- History of Pomerania
