= Starocin =

- Village
- Location within Poland
- Coordinates: 54°13′15″N 19°9′6″E
- Country: Poland
- Voivodeship: Pomeranian
- County: Nowy Dwór
- Gmina: Nowy Dwór Gdański

Starocin ([staˈrɔt͡ɕin]; German: Reinland) is a village in the administrative district of Gmina Nowy Dwór Gdański, within Nowy Dwór County, Pomeranian Voivodeship, in northern Poland.
