= Wężownica =

- Village
- Location within Poland
- Coordinates: 54°10′43″N 19°11′56″E
- Country: Poland
- Voivodeship: Pomeranian
- County: Nowy Dwór
- Gmina: Nowy Dwór Gdański

Wężownica [vɛ̃ʐɔvˈnit͡sa] is a village in the administrative district of Gmina Nowy Dwór Gdański, within Nowy Dwór County, Pomeranian Voivodeship, in northern Poland.
