= Ryki, Pomeranian Voivodeship =

Ryki
- Village
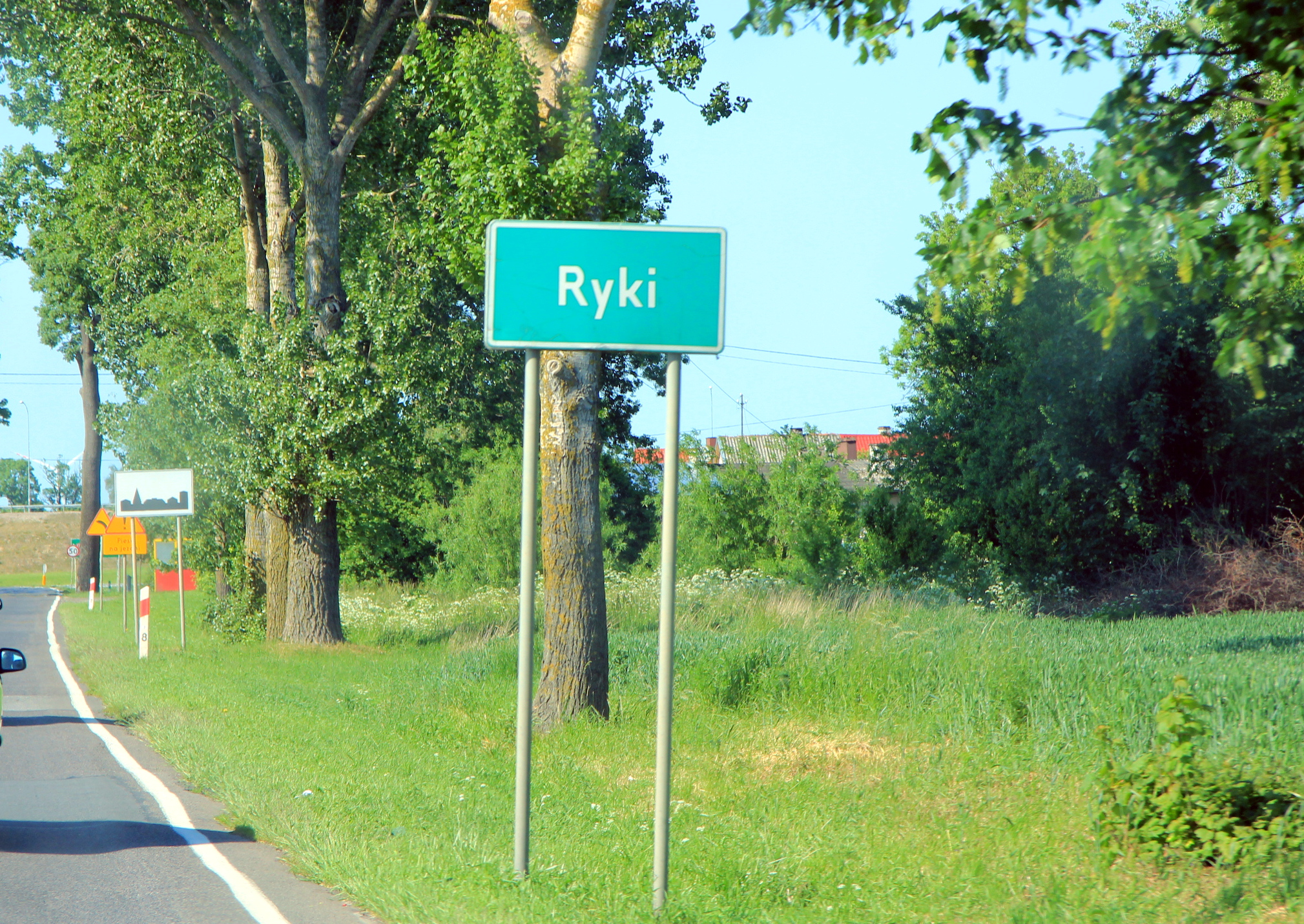

- Location within Poland
- Coordinates: 54°11′49″N 19°7′17″E
- Country: Poland
- Voivodeship: Pomeranian
- County: Nowy Dwór
- Gmina: Nowy Dwór Gdański

Ryki [ˈrɨki] is a village in the administrative district of Gmina Nowy Dwór Gdański, within Nowy Dwór County, Pomeranian Voivodeship, in northern Poland.
