= Orłówko =

- Settlement
- Location within Poland
- Coordinates: 54°11′39″N 19°6′15″E
- Country: Poland
- Voivodeship: Pomeranian
- County: Nowy Dwór
- Gmina: Nowy Dwór Gdański

Orłówko [ɔrˈwufkɔ] is a settlement in the administrative district of Gmina Nowy Dwór Gdański, within Nowy Dwór County, Pomeranian Voivodeship, in northern Poland.
