= Jazowa Druga =

- Settlement
- Location within Poland
- Coordinates: 54°9′12″N 19°14′27″E
- Country: Poland
- Voivodeship: Pomeranian
- County: Nowy Dwór
- Gmina: Nowy Dwór Gdański

Jazowa Druga [jaˈzɔva ˈdruɡa] is a settlement in the administrative district of Gmina Nowy Dwór Gdański, within Nowy Dwór County, Pomeranian Voivodeship, in northern Poland.
