= Orliniec, Pomeranian Voivodeship =

Orliniec
- Village
- Location within Poland
- Coordinates: 54°12′16″N 19°13′21″E
- Country: Poland
- Voivodeship: Pomeranian
- County: Nowy Dwór
- Gmina: Nowy Dwór Gdański
- Population: 110

Orliniec ([ɔrˈliɲɛt͡s]; German: Neulanghorst) is a village in the administrative district of Gmina Nowy Dwór Gdański, within Nowy Dwór County, Pomeranian Voivodeship, in northern Poland.
