= Wężowiec, Pomeranian Voivodeship =

Wężowiec
- Village
- Location within Poland
- Coordinates: 54°14′49″N 19°16′11″E
- Country: Poland
- Voivodeship: Pomeranian
- County: Nowy Dwór
- Gmina: Nowy Dwór Gdański
- Population: 200

Wężowiec [vɛ̃ˈʐɔvjɛt͡s] is a village in the administrative district of Gmina Nowy Dwór Gdański, within Nowy Dwór County, Pomeranian Voivodeship, in northern Poland.
