= Stobna =

- Village
- Location within Poland
- Coordinates: 54°12′7″N 19°16′53″E
- Country: Poland
- Voivodeship: Pomeranian
- County: Nowy Dwór
- Gmina: Nowy Dwór Gdański
- Population: 340

Stobna ([ˈstɔbna]; German: Stuba) is a village in the administrative district of Gmina Nowy Dwór Gdański, within Nowy Dwór County, Pomeranian Voivodeship, in northern Poland.

== Notable residents ==
- Ewald Lindloff (1908–1945), German military officer
