= Wierciny =

- Village
- Location within Poland
- Coordinates: 54°9′14″N 19°15′10″E
- Country: Poland
- Voivodeship: Pomeranian
- County: Nowy Dwór
- Gmina: Nowy Dwór Gdański

Population
  - Total: 260

Wierciny ([vjɛrˈt͡ɕinɨ]; German: Wolfsdorf) is a village in the administrative district of Gmina Nowy Dwór Gdański, within Nowy Dwór County, Pomeranian Voivodeship, in northern Poland.

== See also ==
- History of Pomerania
