= Zawadka, Pomeranian Voivodeship =

Zawadka
- Settlement
- Location within Poland
- Coordinates: 54°9′33″N 19°14′34″E
- Country: Poland
- Voivodeship: Pomeranian
- County: Nowy Dwór
- Gmina: Nowy Dwór Gdański

Zawadka ([zaˈvatka]; German: Hakendorf) is a settlement in the administrative district of Gmina Nowy Dwór Gdański, within Nowy Dwór County, Pomeranian Voivodeship, in northern Poland.
