= Rakowe Pole =

- Village
- Location within Poland
- Coordinates: 54°11′8″N 19°10′40″E
- Country: Poland
- Voivodeship: Pomeranian
- County: Nowy Dwór
- Gmina: Nowy Dwór Gdański
- Population: 140

Rakowe Pole [raˈkɔvɛ ˈpɔlɛ] is a village in the administrative district of Gmina Nowy Dwór Gdański, within Nowy Dwór County, Pomeranian Voivodeship, in northern Poland.
