= Jazowa, Pomeranian Voivodeship =

Jazowa
- Village
- Location within Poland
- Coordinates: 54°10′15″N 19°14′38″E
- Country: Poland
- Voivodeship: Pomeranian
- County: Nowy Dwór
- Gmina: Nowy Dwór Gdański
- Population: 595

Jazowa ([jaˈzɔva]; German: Einlage) is a village in the administrative district of Gmina Nowy Dwór Gdański, within Nowy Dwór County, Pomeranian Voivodeship, in northern Poland.

Before 1772 the area was part of Kingdom of Poland, 1772-1919 Prussia and Germany, 1920-1939 Free City of Danzig, 1939 - February 1945 Nazi Germany.

== See also ==
- History of Pomerania
