= Powalina =

- Village
- Location within Poland
- Coordinates: 54°12′52″N 19°11′59″E
- Country: Poland
- Voivodeship: Pomeranian
- County: Nowy Dwór
- Gmina: Nowy Dwór Gdański
- Population: 160

Powalina ([pɔvaˈlina]; German: Walldorf) is a village in the administrative district of Gmina Nowy Dwór Gdański, within Nowy Dwór County, Pomeranian Voivodeship, in northern Poland.
