= Cyganka, Pomeranian Voivodeship =

Cyganka
- Village
- Location within Poland
- Coordinates: 54°13′39″N 19°7′5″E
- Country: Poland
- Voivodeship: Pomeranian
- County: Nowy Dwór
- Gmina: Nowy Dwór Gdański

Cyganka ([t͡sɨˈɡanka]; German: Platenhof) is a village in the administrative district of Gmina Nowy Dwór Gdański, within Nowy Dwór County, Pomeranian Voivodeship, in northern Poland.
