= Solnica =

- Village
- Location within Poland
- Coordinates: 54°11′19″N 19°12′34″E
- Country: Poland
- Voivodeship: Pomeranian
- County: Nowy Dwór
- Gmina: Nowy Dwór Gdański
- Population: 260

Solnica ([sɔlˈnit͡sa]; German: Lakendorf) is a village in the administrative district of Gmina Nowy Dwór Gdański, within Nowy Dwór County, Pomeranian Voivodeship, in northern Poland.

The village was founded in 1600 by the Olęder settlers in the area of Wielkie Żuławy Malborskie.

Until 1772 Laakendorf was part of the Kingdom of Poland. The First Partition of Poland in 1772 resulted in the creation of a new province in 1773, called West Prussia, in which Laakendorf was located. The village was situated in the district (Kreis) of Marienburg until the establishment of the Free City of Danzig in 1920. Later came under the control of Nazi Germany during World War II until February 1945, when it was occupied by Soviet forces and returned to Poland.
