= Lesnovo =

Lesnovo may refer to:

- Lesnovo, Sofia Province, a village in central-western Bulgaria, part of Elin Pelin Municipality, Sofia Province
- Lesnovo, North Macedonia, a village in North Macedonia, near Probištip
- Lesnovo monastery, North Macedonia

== See also ==
- Leśnowo
