= Trojaki =

- Settlement
- Location within Poland
- Coordinates: 54°11′40″N 19°15′26″E
- Country: Poland
- Voivodeship: Pomeranian
- County: Nowy Dwór
- Gmina: Nowy Dwór Gdański

Trojaki ([trɔˈjaki]; German: Drillinge) is a settlement in the administrative district of Gmina Nowy Dwór Gdański, within Nowy Dwór County, Pomeranian Voivodeship, in northern Poland.

== See also ==
- History of Pomerania
