= Lubieszynek Drugi =

- Village
- Location within Poland
- Coordinates: 54°11′24″N 19°0′47″E
- Country: Poland
- Voivodeship: Pomeranian
- County: Nowy Dwór
- Gmina: Nowy Dwór Gdański
- Population: 240

Lubieszynek Drugi [lubjɛˈʂɨnɛk ˈdruɡi] is a village in the administrative district of Gmina Nowy Dwór Gdański, within Nowy Dwór County, Pomeranian Voivodeship, in northern Poland.
