= Orłowo, Pomeranian Voivodeship =

Orłowo
- Village
- Location within Poland
- Coordinates: 54°12′22″N 19°4′45″E
- Country: Poland
- Voivodeship: Pomeranian
- County: Nowy Dwór
- Gmina: Nowy Dwór Gdański
- Population: 580

Orłowo ([ɔrˈwɔvɔ]; German: Orloff) is a village in the administrative district of Gmina Nowy Dwór Gdański, within Nowy Dwór County, Pomeranian Voivodeship, in northern Poland.
