= Gozdawa, Pomeranian Voivodeship =

Gozdawa
- Village
- Location within Poland
- Coordinates: 54°13′18″N 19°11′22″E
- Country: Poland
- Voivodeship: Pomeranian
- County: Nowy Dwór
- Gmina: Nowy Dwór Gdański
- Population: 560

Gozdawa ([ɡɔzˈdava]; German: Neustädterwald) is a village in the administrative district of Gmina Nowy Dwór Gdański, within Nowy Dwór County, Pomeranian Voivodeship, in northern Poland.
