= Kępki, Pomeranian Voivodeship =

Kępki
- Village
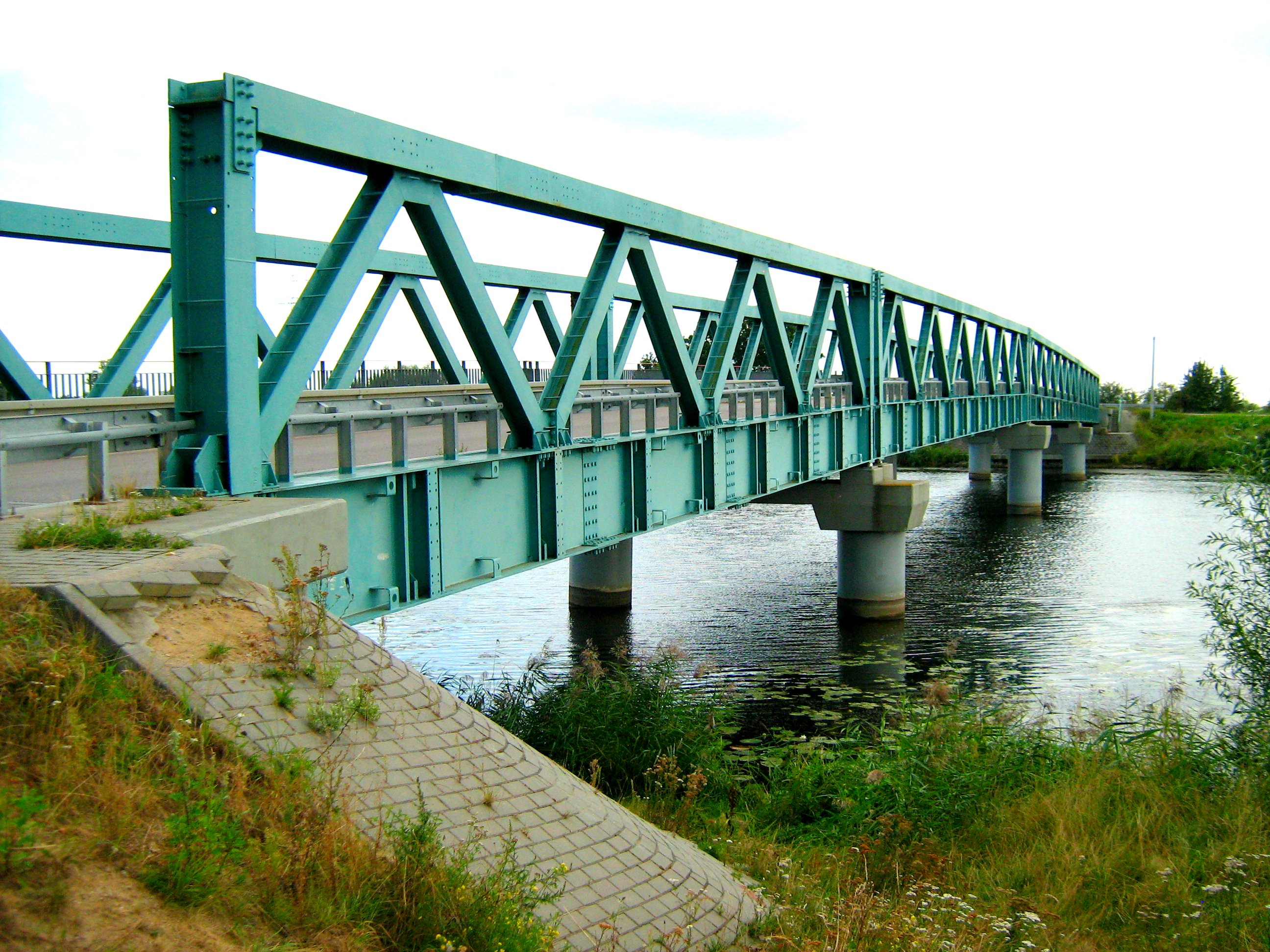
- Bridge over the Nogat River in Kępki

- Location within Poland
- Coordinates: 54°11′26″N 19°18′41″E
- Country: Poland
- Voivodeship: Pomeranian
- County: Nowy Dwór
- Gmina: Nowy Dwór Gdański
- Population: 270

Kępki ([ˈkɛmpki]; German: Zeyer) is a village in the administrative district of Gmina Nowy Dwór Gdański, within Nowy Dwór County, Pomeranian Voivodeship, in northern Poland.
