= Stawiec =

Stawiec may refer to the following places in Poland:

- Stawiec, Lower Silesian Voivodeship (south-west Poland)
- Stawiec, Malbork County in Pomeranian Voivodeship (north Poland)
- Stawiec, Gmina Nowy Dwór Gdański in Pomeranian Voivodeship (north Poland)
- Stawiec, Warmian-Masurian Voivodeship (north Poland)
