= Myszkowo, Pomeranian Voivodeship =

Myszkowo
- Village
- Location within Poland
- Coordinates: 54°8′57″N 19°8′39″E
- Country: Poland
- Voivodeship: Pomeranian
- County: Nowy Dwór
- Gmina: Nowy Dwór Gdański
- Population: 320

Myszkowo [mɨʂˈkɔvɔ] is a village in the administrative district of Gmina Nowy Dwór Gdański, within Nowy Dwór County, Pomeranian Voivodeship, in northern Poland.
