= Kępiny Małe =

- Village
- Location within Poland
- Coordinates: 54°13′42″N 19°16′28″E
- Country: Poland
- Voivodeship: Pomeranian
- County: Nowy Dwór
- Gmina: Nowy Dwór Gdański
- Population: 440

Kępiny Małe ([kɛmˈpinɨ ˈmawɛ]; German: Zeyersvorderkampen) is a village in the administrative district of Gmina Nowy Dwór Gdański, within Nowy Dwór County, Pomeranian Voivodeship, in northern Poland.
