= Nowy Dwór County =

Nowy Dwór County may refer to either of two counties (powiats) having the Polish name powiat nowodworski:

- Nowy Dwór County, in Pomeranian Voivodeship (north Poland)
- Nowy Dwór County, Masovian Voivodeship, in Masovian Voivodeship (east-central Poland)
