= Swaryszewo =

- Settlement
- Location within Poland
- Coordinates: 54°13′31″N 19°13′35″E
- Country: Poland
- Voivodeship: Pomeranian
- County: Nowy Dwór
- Gmina: Nowy Dwór Gdański

Swaryszewo ([sfarɨˈʂɛvɔ]; German: Keitlau) is a settlement in the administrative district of Gmina Nowy Dwór Gdański, within Nowy Dwór County, Pomeranian Voivodeship, in northern Poland.

== See also ==
- History of Pomerania
