= Rychnowo Żuławskie =

- Village
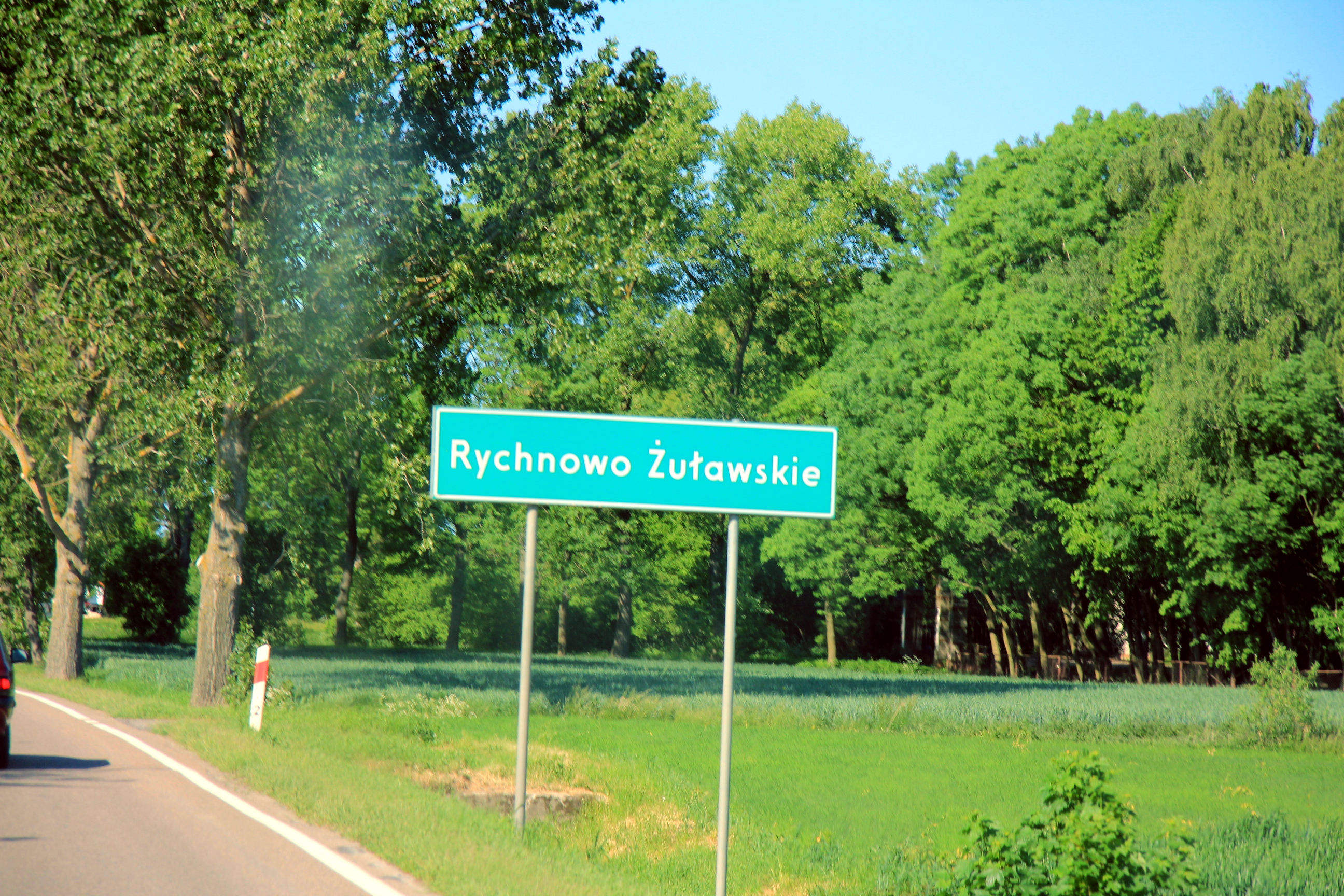

- Location within Poland
- Coordinates: 54°11′15″N 19°6′49″E
- Country: Poland
- Voivodeship: Pomeranian
- County: Nowy Dwór
- Gmina: Nowy Dwór Gdański
- Population: 230

Rychnowo Żuławskie ([rɨxˈnɔvɔ ʐuˈwafskʲɛ]; German: Rückenau) is a village in the administrative district of Gmina Nowy Dwór Gdański, within Nowy Dwór County, Pomeranian Voivodeship, in northern Poland.

== See also ==
- History of Pomerania
