= Suchowo, Pomeranian Voivodeship =

Suchowo
- Settlement
- Location within Poland
- Coordinates: 54°11′37″N 19°11′8″E
- Country: Poland
- Voivodeship: Pomeranian
- County: Nowy Dwór
- Gmina: Nowy Dwór Gdański

Suchowo ([suˈxɔvɔ]; German: Rosenort) is a settlement in the administrative district of Gmina Nowy Dwór Gdański, within Nowy Dwór County, Pomeranian Voivodeship, in northern Poland.

== See also ==
- History of Pomerania
