= Nowinki, Gmina Nowy Dwór Gdański =

Nowinki
- Village
- Location within Poland
- Coordinates: 54°12′49″N 19°15′52″E
- Country: Poland
- Voivodeship: Pomeranian
- County: Nowy Dwór
- Gmina: Nowy Dwór Gdański
- Population: 160

Nowinki ([nɔˈvinki]; German: Neudorf) is a village in the administrative district of Gmina Nowy Dwór Gdański, within Nowy Dwór County, Pomeranian Voivodeship, in northern Poland.
