= Lubieszewo Pierwsze =

- Village
- Location within Poland
- Coordinates: 54°10′51″N 18°59′18″E
- Country: Poland
- Voivodeship: Pomeranian
- County: Nowy Dwór
- Gmina: Nowy Dwór Gdański
- Population: 120

Lubieszewo Pierwsze [lubjɛˈʂɛvɔ ˈpjɛrfʂɛ] is a village in the administrative district of Gmina Nowy Dwór Gdański, within Nowy Dwór County, Pomeranian Voivodeship, in northern Poland.
