= Piotrowo, Gmina Nowy Dwór Gdański =

Piotrowo
- Village
- Location within Poland
- Coordinates: 54°13′23″N 19°10′5″E
- Country: Poland
- Voivodeship: Pomeranian
- County: Nowy Dwór
- Gmina: Nowy Dwór Gdański

Piotrowo ([pjɔˈtrɔvɔ]; German: Niederpetershagen) is a village in the administrative district of Gmina Nowy Dwór Gdański, within Nowy Dwór County, Pomeranian Voivodeship, in northern Poland.
