= Pieczewo, Pomeranian Voivodeship =

Pieczewo
- Settlement
- Location within Poland
- Coordinates: 54°12′58″N 19°3′31″E
- Country: Poland
- Voivodeship: Pomeranian
- County: Nowy Dwór
- Gmina: Nowy Dwór Gdański

Pieczewo ([pjɛˈt͡ʂɛvɔ]; German: Pietzkendorf) is a settlement in the administrative district of Gmina Nowy Dwór Gdański, within Nowy Dwór County, Pomeranian Voivodeship, in northern Poland.
