= Stawiec, Gmina Nowy Dwór Gdański =

Stawiec
- Village
- Location within Poland
- Coordinates: 54°11′18″N 19°0′10″E
- Country: Poland
- Voivodeship: Pomeranian
- County: Nowy Dwór
- Gmina: Nowy Dwór Gdański

Stawiec ([ˈstavjɛt͡s]; German: Neuteichsdorf) is a village in the administrative district of Gmina Nowy Dwór Gdański, within Nowy Dwór County, Pomeranian Voivodeship, in northern Poland.

== See also ==
- History of Pomerania
