= Orłowskie Pole =

- Settlement
- Location within Poland
- Coordinates: 54°12′55″N 19°4′17″E
- Country: Poland
- Voivodeship: Pomeranian
- County: Nowy Dwór
- Gmina: Nowy Dwór Gdański

Orłowskie Pole ([ɔrˈwɔfskʲɛ ˈpɔlɛ]; German: Orlofferfelde) is a settlement in the administrative district of Gmina Nowy Dwór Gdański, within Nowy Dwór County, Pomeranian Voivodeship, in northern Poland.
