= Marynowy =

- Village
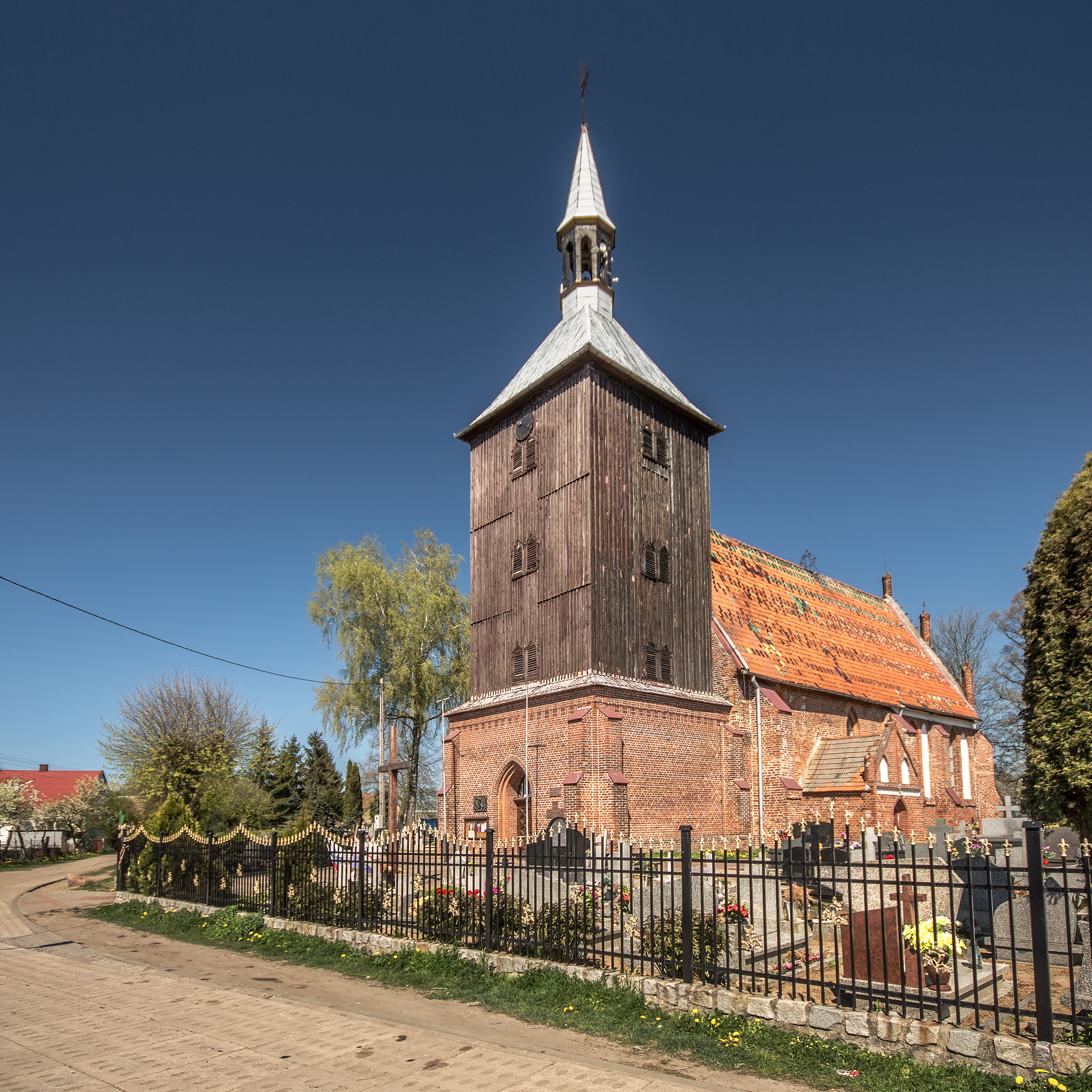

- Location within Poland
- Coordinates: 54°9′48″N 19°5′32″E
- Country: Poland
- Voivodeship: Pomeranian
- County: Nowy Dwór
- Gmina: Nowy Dwór Gdański
- Population: 570

Marynowy ([marɨˈnɔvɨ]; German: Marienau) is a village in the administrative district of Gmina Nowy Dwór Gdański, within Nowy Dwór County, Pomeranian Voivodeship, in northern Poland.
