= Myszewko =

- Village
- Location within Poland
- Coordinates: 54°10′12″N 19°8′0″E
- Country: Poland
- Voivodeship: Pomeranian
- County: Nowy Dwór
- Gmina: Nowy Dwór Gdański
- Population: 320

Myszewko ([mɨˈʂɛfkɔ]; German: Kleinmausdorf) is a village in the administrative district of Gmina Nowy Dwór Gdański, within Nowy Dwór County, Pomeranian Voivodeship, in northern Poland.

== Geography ==
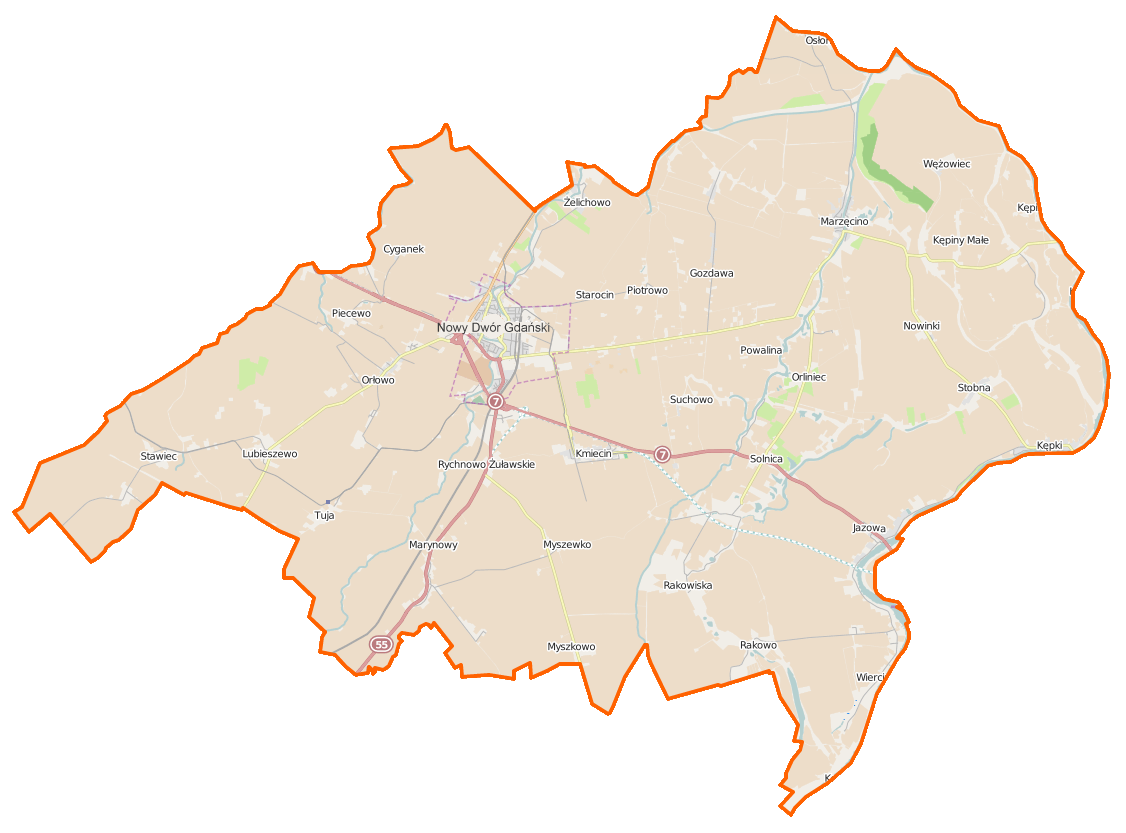
Nowy Dwór Gdański (gmina) location map
