= Cyganek =

- Village
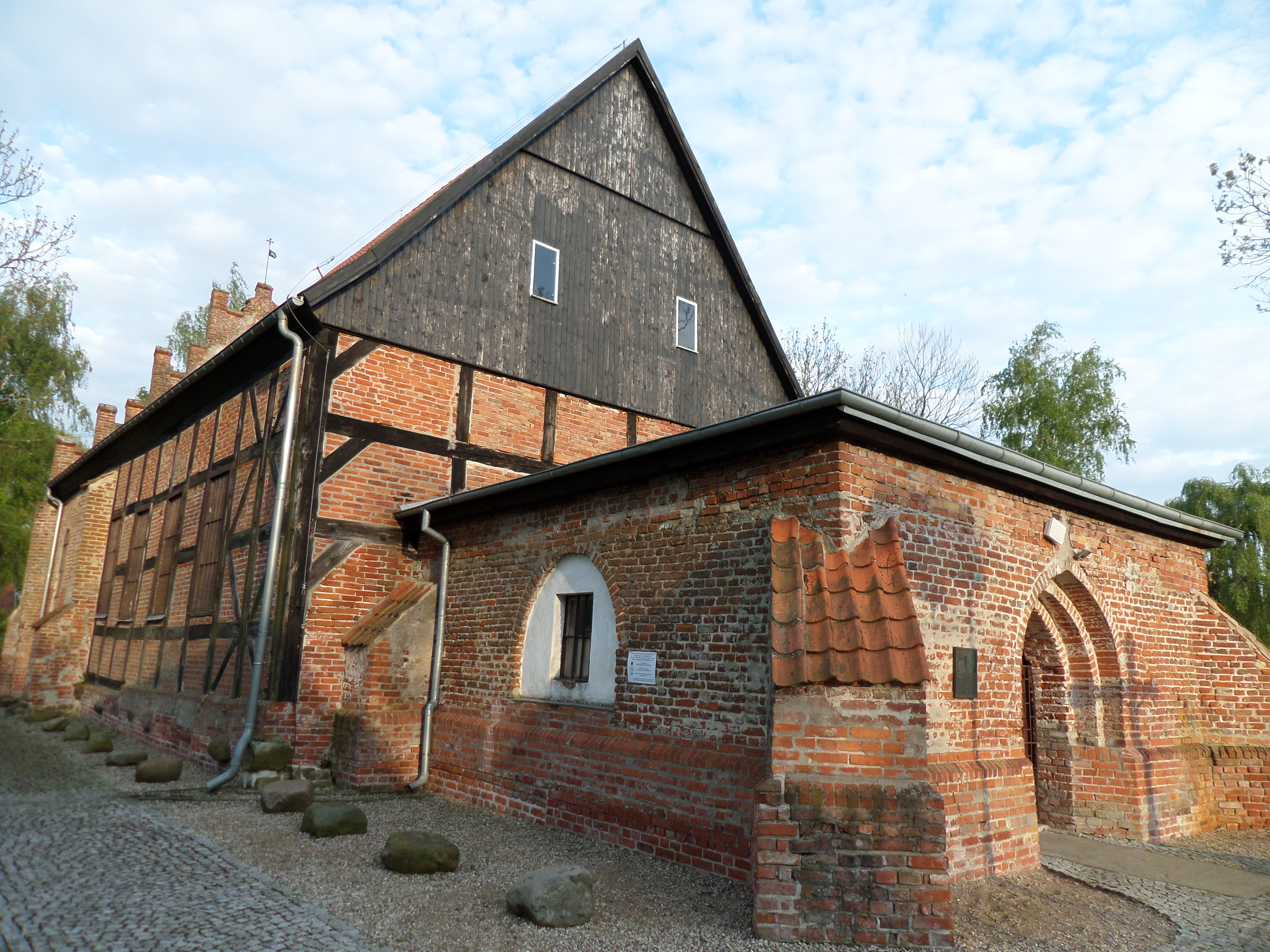
- Saint Nicholas church in Cyganek

- Location within Poland
- Coordinates: 54°13′49″N 19°5′2″E
- Country: Poland
- Voivodeship: Pomeranian
- County: Nowy Dwór
- Gmina: Nowy Dwór Gdański
- Population: 80

Cyganek [t͡sɨˈɡanɛk] (formerly German: Tiegenhagen) is a village in the administrative district of Gmina Nowy Dwór Gdański, within Nowy Dwór County, Pomeranian Voivodeship, in northern Poland.
