= Gmina Nowy Dwór Gdański =

Gmina Nowy Dwór Gdański Nowy Dwór Gdański Commune
- Gmina
- Coat of arms
- Interactive map of Gmina Nowy Dwór Gdański
- Coordinates (Nowy Dwór Gdański): 54°13′N 19°7′E
- Country: Poland
- Voivodeship: Pomeranian
- County: Nowy Dwór
- Seat: Nowy Dwór Gdański

Area
  - Total: 213 km^{2} (82 sq mi)

Population (2006)
  - Total: 17,887
  - Density: 84.0/km^{2} (217/sq mi)
  - Urban: 9,948
  - Rural: 7,939
- Website: http://www.miastonowydwor.pl/

Gmina Nowy Dwór Gdański is an urban-rural gmina (administrative district) in Nowy Dwór County, Pomeranian Voivodeship, in northern Poland. Its seat is the town of Nowy Dwór Gdański, which lies approximately 36 kilometres (22 mi) south-east of the regional capital Gdańsk.

The gmina covers an area of 213 square kilometres (82.2 sq mi), and as of 2006 its total population is 17,887 (out of which the population of Nowy Dwór Gdański amounts to 9,948, and the population of the rural part of the gmina is 7,939).

== Villages ==
Apart from the town of Nowy Dwór Gdański, Gmina Nowy Dwór Gdański contains the villages and settlements of Cyganek, Cyganka, Gozdawa, Jazowa, Jazowa Druga, Kępiny Małe, Kępki, Kmiecin, Łączki Myszewskie, Leśnowo, Lubieszewo, Lubieszewo Pierwsze, Lubieszynek Drugi, Marynowy, Marzęcino, Myszewko, Myszkowo, Nowinki, Orliniec, Orłówko, Orłowo, Orłowskie Pole, Osłonka, Pieczewo, Piotrowo, Powalina, Rakowe Pole, Rakowiska, Rakowo, Robakowiec, Różewo, Rychnowo Żuławskie, Ryki, Solnica, Starocin, Stawiec, Stobna, Suchowo, Swaryszewo, Trojaki, Tuja, Wężowiec, Wężownica, Wierciny, Zawadka and Żelichowo.

== Neighbouring gminas ==
Gmina Nowy Dwór Gdański is bordered by the gminas of Elbląg, Gronowo Elbląskie, Nowy Staw, Ostaszewo, Stegna and Sztutowo.
