= Tuja, Gmina Nowy Dwór Gdański =

Tuja
- Village
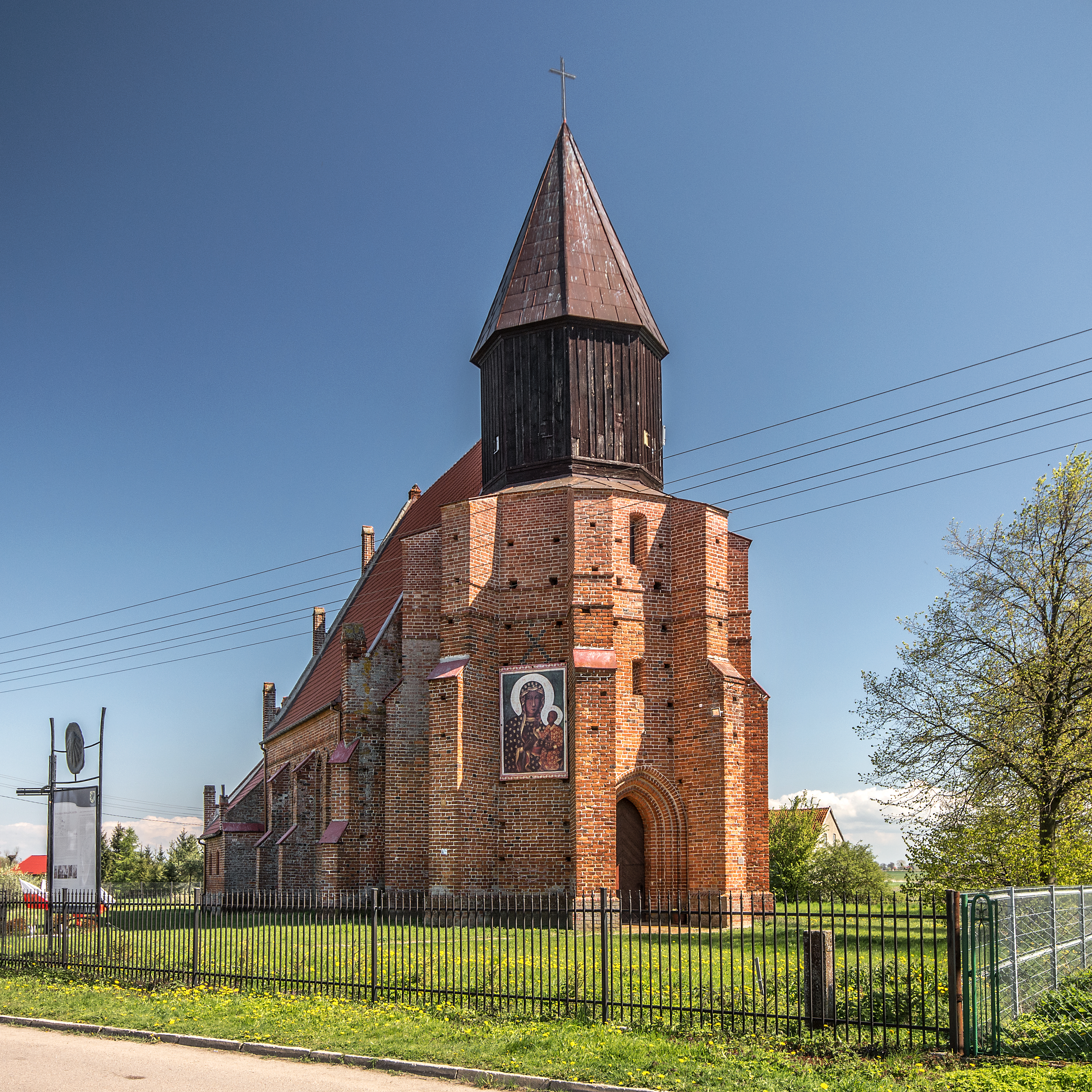
- Church of Saint James the Greater

- Location within Poland
- Coordinates: 54°10′42″N 19°3′37″E
- Country: Poland
- Voivodeship: Pomeranian
- County: Nowy Dwór
- Gmina: Nowy Dwór Gdański

Population
  - Total: 190

Tuja ([ˈtuja]; German: Tiege) is a village in the administrative district of Gmina Nowy Dwór Gdański, within Nowy Dwór County, Pomeranian Voivodeship, in northern Poland.

== See also ==
- History of Pomerania
