= Żelichowo, Pomeranian Voivodeship =

Żelichowo
- Village
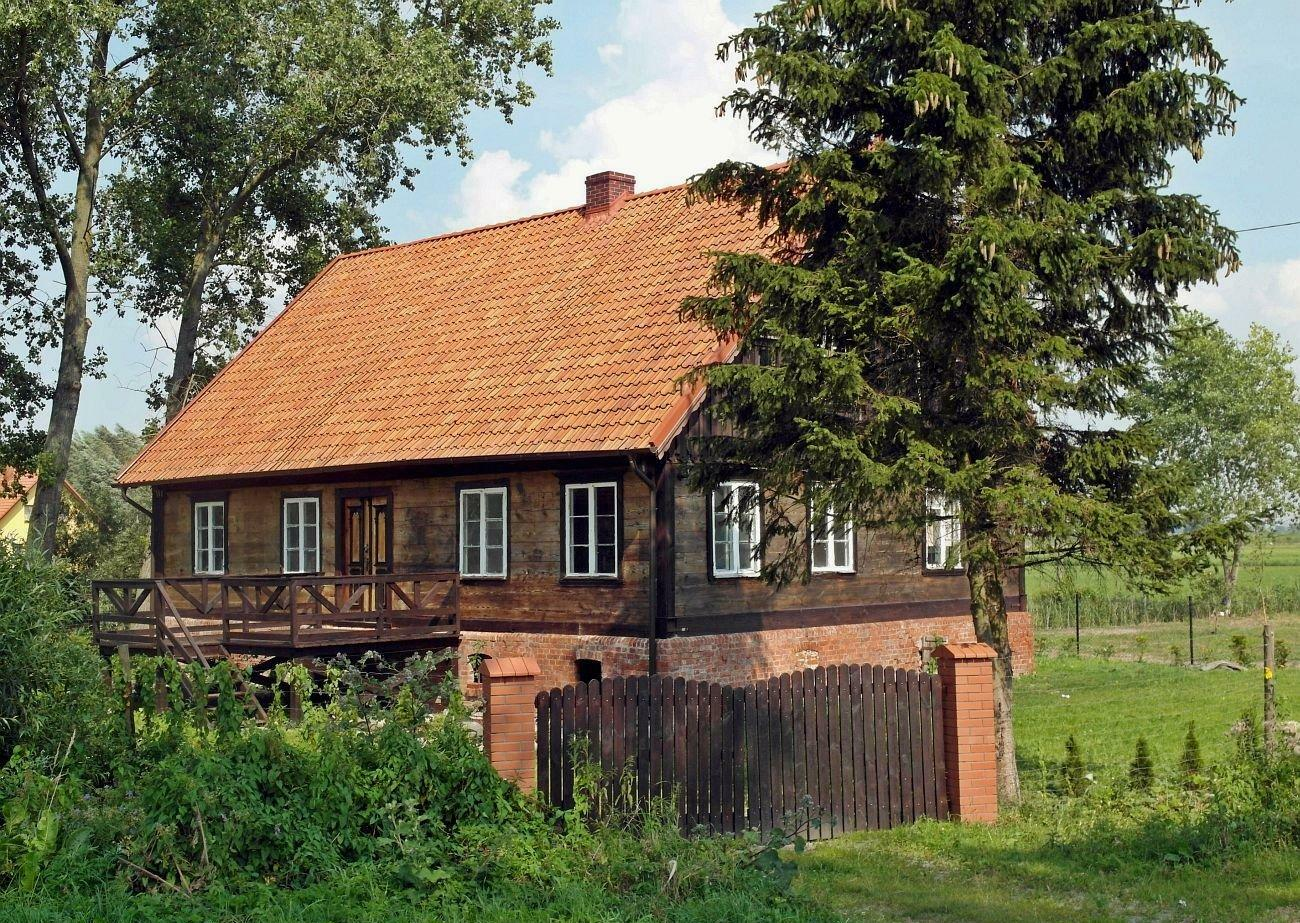

- Location within Poland
- Coordinates: 54°14′34″N 19°8′33″E
- Country: Poland
- Voivodeship: Pomeranian
- County: Nowy Dwór
- Gmina: Nowy Dwór Gdański
- Population: 510 (2,008)

Żelichowo ([ʐɛliˈxɔvɔ]; German: Petershagen) is a village in the administrative district of Gmina Nowy Dwór Gdański, within Nowy Dwór County, Pomeranian Voivodeship, in northern Poland.

The village was founded in 1328. In 1768 a Catholic chapel was built (also used by Mennonites), which burned down in 1778 and has not been rebuilt. In 1776, there were 63 names of Mennonites. In 1820, 366 people lived in Petershagen and Pendelmuehle, including 208 Mennonites. The petition from 1868 signed Mennonite Jacob Wiens from this village. The area of the village was at the time 87 voloks (1 volok = 17.9550 ha) and 4 morgens (1 Kulmer Morgen = 0.560117 ha), 60 houses stood there, and among 472 residents, 143 were Mennonites.

== See also ==
- History of Pomerania
