= Tuja (river) =

Tuga
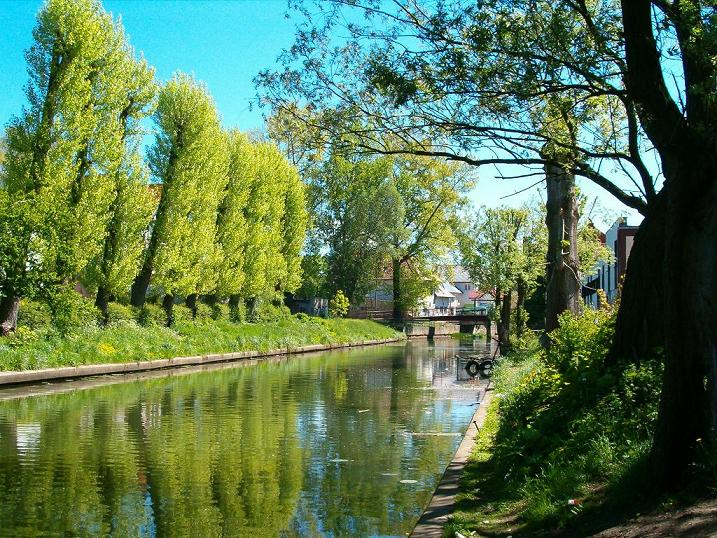

Location
- Country: Poland

Physical characteristics
- Mouth
  - location: Szkarpawa
  - coordinates: 54°17′04″N 19°08′20″E

Basin features
- Progression: Szkarpawa→ Vistula Lagoon

Tuga (German: Tiege) is a river of northern Poland. It flows through Nowy Dwór Gdański, and joins the Szkarpawa near Tujsk.
