= Nowy Dwór County, Pomeranian Voivodeship =

Nowy Dwór County Powiat nowodworski
- County
- Flag Coat of arms

- Division into gminas
- Coordinates (Nowy Dwór Gdański): 54°13′N 19°7′E
- Country: Poland
- Voivodeship: Pomeranian
- Seat: Nowy Dwór Gdański
- Gminas: Total 5 (incl. 1 urban): Krynica Morska; Gmina Nowy Dwór Gdański; Gmina Ostaszewo; Gmina Stegna; Gmina Sztutowo

Area
  - Total: 652.75 km^{2} (252.03 sq mi)

Population (2019)
  - Total: 35,656
  - Density: 54.624/km^{2} (141.48/sq mi)
  - Urban: 11,208
  - Rural: 24,448
- Car plates: GND
- Website: www.nowydworgdanski.pl

Nowy Dwór County (Polish: powiat nowodworski, formerly Nowy Dwór Gdański County) is a unit of territorial administration and local government (powiat) in Pomeranian Voivodeship, northern Poland, on the Baltic coast. It came into being on 1 January 1999 as a result of the Polish local government reforms passed in 1998. Its administrative seat and largest town is Nowy Dwór Gdański, which lies 36 kilometres (22 mi) south-east of the regional capital Gdańsk. The only other town in the county is Krynica Morska, lying 29 km (18 mi) north-east of Nowy Dwór Gdański, on the Vistula Spit.

The county covers an area of 652.75 square kilometres (252.0 sq mi). As of 2019 its total population is 35,656, out of which the population of Nowy Dwór Gdański is 9,905, that of Krynica Morska is 1,303, and the rural population is 24,448.

Nowy Dwór County on a map of the counties of Pomeranian Voivodeship

Nowy Dwór County is bordered by the Vistula Lagoon to the east, Elbląg County to the south-east, Malbork County to the south, Gdańsk County and the city of Gdańsk to the west, and the Baltic Sea to the north. It also has a short land border with Russia (Kaliningrad Oblast) to the north-east, on the Vistula Spit.

== Administrative divisions ==
The county is subdivided into five gminas (one urban, one urban-rural and three rural). These are listed in the following table, in descending order of population.

Gmina	Type	Area (km^{2})	Population (2019)	Seat
Gmina Nowy Dwór Gdański	urban-rural	213.0	17,745	Nowy Dwór Gdański
Gmina Stegna	rural	169.6	9,745	Stegna
Gmina Sztutowo	rural	107.5	3,657	Sztutowo
Gmina Ostaszewo	rural	60.7	3,206	Ostaszewo
Krynica Morska	urban	102.0	1,303	
