= Vistula Fens =

River delta of the Vistula

Żuławy Wiślane
- Vistula Fens
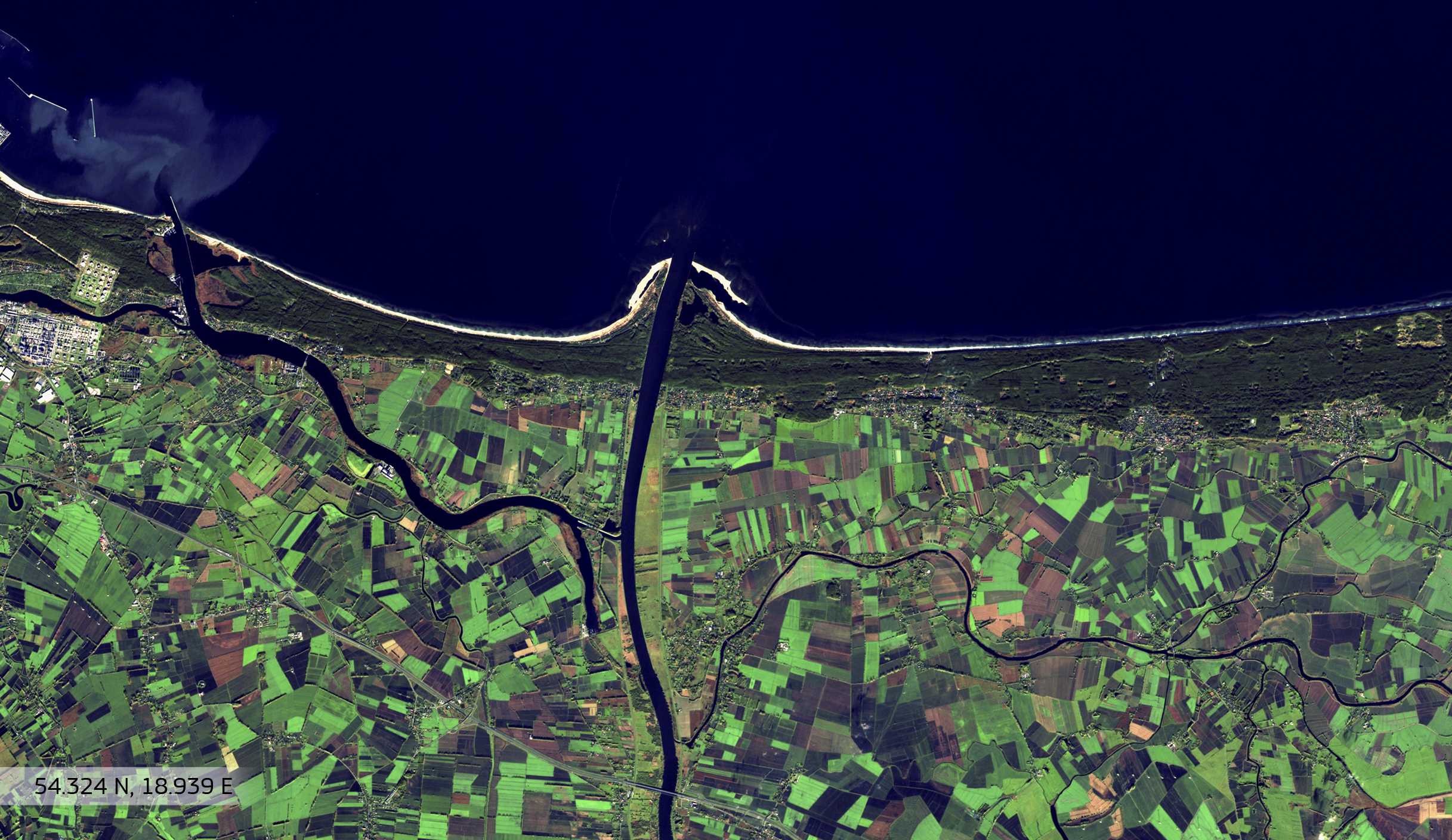
- Where the Vistula enters the Baltic Sea

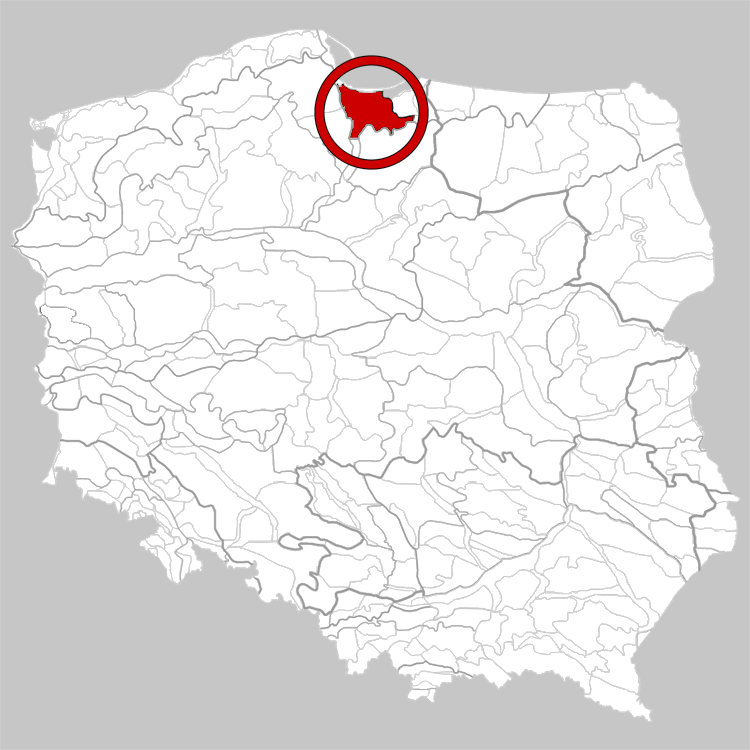
- Location of Żuławy (red) on a map of Poland
- Location: Pomeranian Voivodeship and western parts of Warmian-Masurian Voivodeship, Poland
- Nearest town: Nowy Dwór Gdański and Nowy Staw
- Coordinates: 54.16667°N 19°E
- Area: 1,700 km^{2} (170,000 ha)
- Elevation: >10 metres above sea level

Ramsar Wetland
- Official name: Vistula River Mouth
- Designated: 9 April 2015
- Reference no.: 2321

Żuławy Wiślane (plural from "żuława", meaning fen), in English known as the Vistula Fens, is the alluvial delta area of the river Vistula, in the northern part of Poland. It is a flat and deforested region comprising wetlands and agricultural plains that cover approximately 1,700 square kilometres, with much of the land being situated below sea level. Poland's lowest point (1.8 metres below sea level) is located at Raczki Elbląskie in the Żuławy region.

The area was largely reclaimed artificially by means of dykes, pumps, channels and an extensive drainage system. Its shape is similar to a reversed triangle formed by the branching of the Vistula into two separate rivers, Leniwka and Nogat at its height, confined by the rivers themselves, and closed by the Vistula Lagoon at its base.

Żuławy Wiślane extends from Poland's Pomerania Province in the west to the Warmian-Masurian Voivodeship in the east, roughly between the cities of Elbląg, Malbork, Tczew and Gdańsk. The two largest towns which belong to the region are Nowy Dwór Gdański and Nowy Staw. Żuławy are also categorised as an ethnographic region, historically settled by immigrant Mennonites from the Netherlands (Friesland) and Flanders who became collectively known as Hollanders, or Olęders in Polish. Much of the local architecture and other cultural aspects have been shaped by those communities.

== Etymology ==
There is no definite statement for the origin of the name "Żuławy". The term is believed to be derived from the word "solov" in the now-extinct Prussian language, or from Polish noun "żuł" for mud.

== History ==
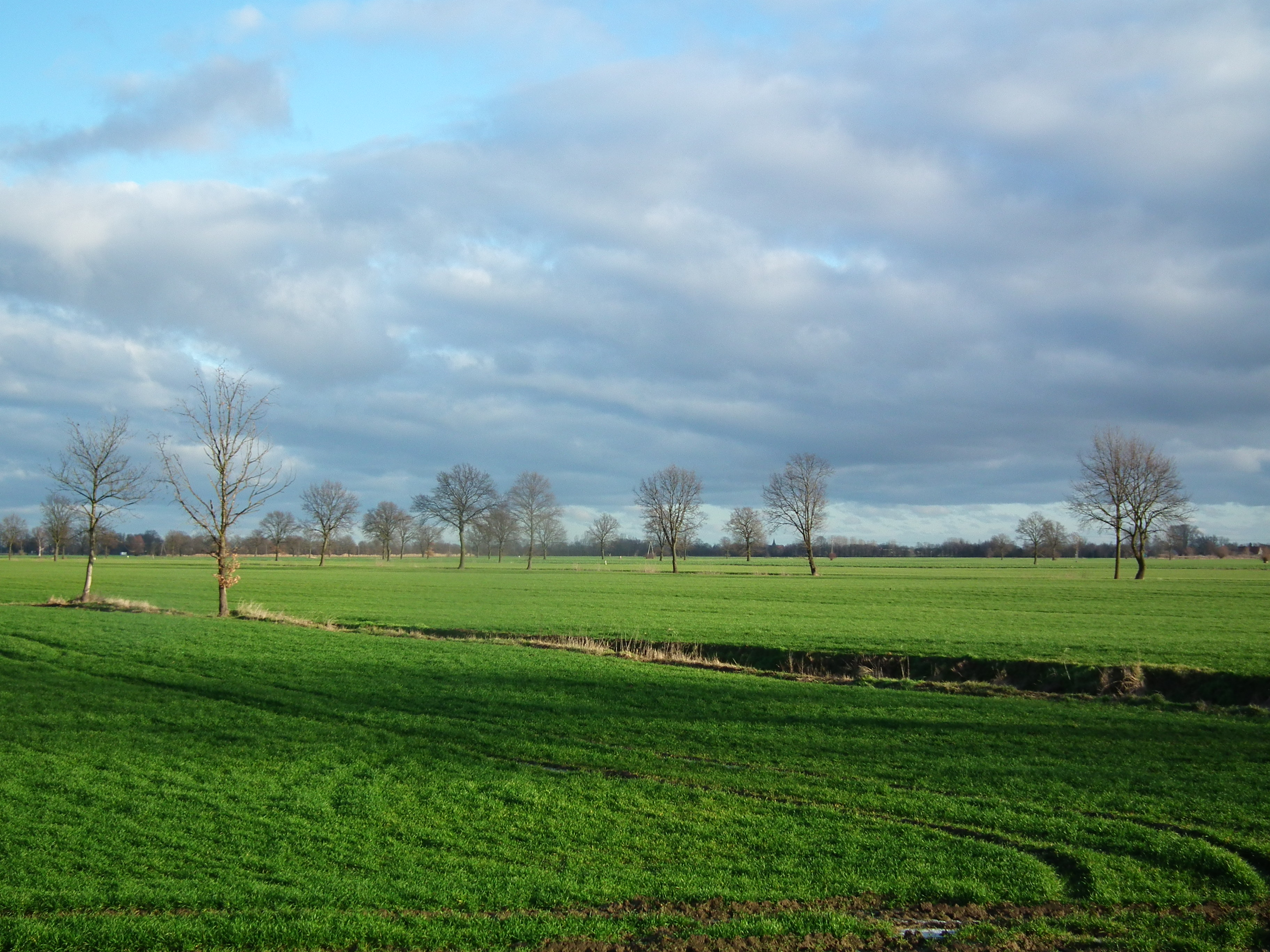
Landscape of the Vistula Fens region

=== Prehistory and initial settlement ===
The first traces of settlements reach back to the period between 2,500 and 1,700 BC, being proved by excavation sites from Niedźwiedziówka, Lubieszewo, Ostaszewo, Kaczynos, Kończewice, Krasnołęka, Lasowice Wielkie or Lichnowy. They appear to have been of impermanent form, as they served presumably for fishery and amber acquisition. The range and density of settlements had not changed in the course of the next centuries until around the ninth century, when the emergence of the Baltic tribe Estowie boosted occupation of Żuławy Wiślane. One, the best known, is Truso, a large fishery-trading center in present-day Janów Pomorski near Elbląg. Before the thirteenth century population was generally restricted to morainic heights around the delta, in the surroundings of Gdańsk, Miłobądzu, Gorzędzieju, Lichnowach and Węgrach (the Slavic people), and alongside Lake Drużno and Wysoczyźnie Elbląskiej (for Old Prussians).

=== Expansion ===
In the 13th century by contrast, the local population experienced a rapid growth brought about by mixed Slavic-Prussian colonization. In effect, new villages had emerged, and from them many have survived up to now under unchanged names. In a space of one hundred years, the Slavic settlements reached the line Płonia Wielka, Cedry Wielkie, Ostaszewo, Lubieszewo, Świerki, Malbork. On the other hand, Żuławy Wiślane drew numerous Dutch and German immigrants.

=== After the Partitions of Poland ===
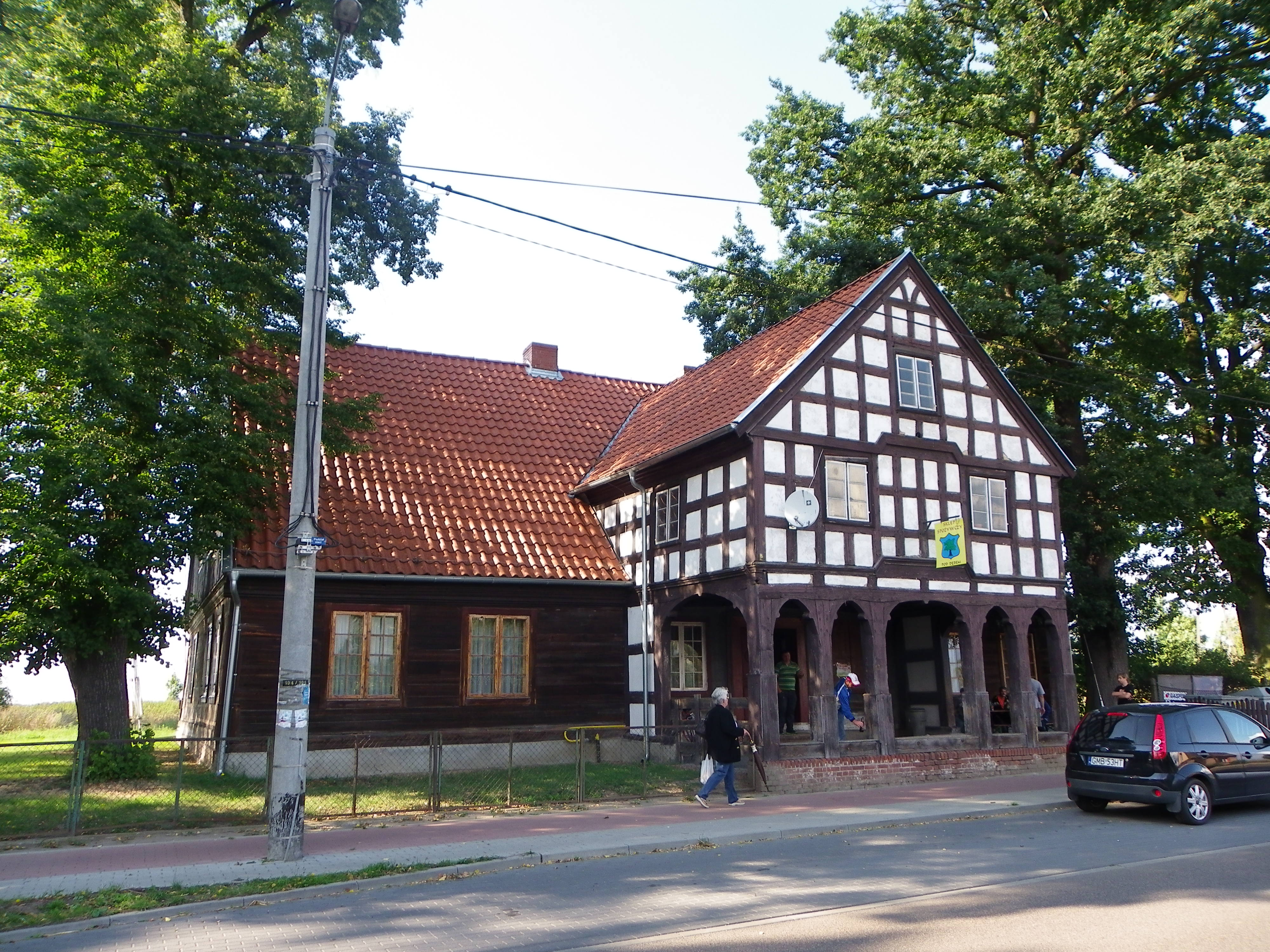
An arcaded timber-framed house in Nowy Staw from the early 19th century – an architectural remnant of the Olęders (Holländern) in Żuławy

In the aftermath of the Second Partition of Poland in 1793, the Żuławy Wiślane settlements were incorporated into the Prussian Kingdom as two districts: Danziger Niederung and Danziger Höhe. After Poland regained independence in 1918, the settlements neither stayed in Germany nor were they included in the new Polish state; instead, they became part of the Free City of Danzig. When Hitler came into power in Germany, the Free City of Danzig in due course fell into the influence zone of Germany. When World War II was finally over, the two Żuławy Wiślane were turned over to the Polish state in 1945. Almost all of the German inhabitants have been expelled, and the region has been resettled with Polish people.

Historically part of Royal Prussia and then West Prussia, since 1999 the area covers the easternmost part of the Pomeranian Voivodeship.

== Kursenieki ==
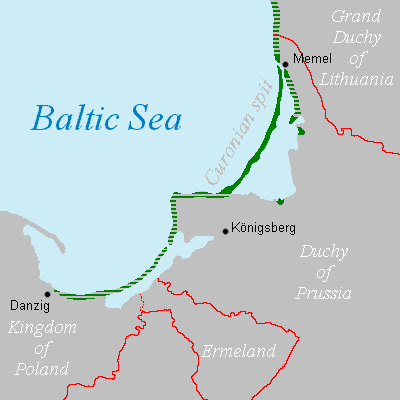
Curonian-populated area in 1649.

While today the Kursenieki, also known as Kuršininkai are a nearly extinct Baltic ethnic group living along the Curonian Spit, in 1649 Kuršininkai settlement spanned from Memel (Klaipėda) to Danzig (Gdańsk), including in the area of the Nemunas Delta. The Kuršininkai were eventually assimilated by the Germans, except along the Curonian Spit where some still live. The Kuršininkai were considered Latvians until after World War I when Latvia gained independence from the Russian Empire, a consideration based on linguistic arguments. This was the rationale for Latvian claims over the Curonian Spit, Memel, and other territories of East Prussia which would be later dropped.

== Geography ==
Żuławy is traditionally divided, according to the historical ownership, into:

- Żuławy Gdańskie - the western part, from Gdańsk to the Vistula
- Żuławy Malborskie or Żuławy Wielkie (Greater Zulawy) - the part between Vistula and its right arm Nogat
- Żuławy Elbląskie - on the eastern bank of the Nogat.

Terrain seems to look strikingly flat, but a topographic map states otherwise. For instance, land slopes down at some points below sea level. Depressions account for 28% of the overall area of the delta. The lowest point, 1.8 m below the surface, is located by Jezioro Drużno, at the state road 22 between Elbląg and Malbork in Raczki Elbląskie, making that terrain the lowest point in Poland. Second in size depression land area is placed around Nowy Dwór Gdański.

Surface water has lost its unique character due to impact of human activity. Water does not flow as freely as in other parts of the country, because most of the water is on equal altitude, and in fact its circulation is carried out artificially.

(..) Centuries of human activities are visible in the thousands of kilometers of canals and drainage ditches, a dense drainage network, the banking up of the rivers, pumping stations and the formation of a system of polders. In effect, the natural environment underwent such transformation that it would be difficult to find any fragments, which remain unchanged." (B. Augustowski, Żuławy Wiślane, Gdańskie Towarzystwo Naukowe, Gdańsk 1976)
