= Katarzyna Tomiak-Siemieniewicz =

First female fighter pilot in Poland

- Born: 1987 (age 38–39); Niedźwiedź, Poland
- Military career
- Allegiance: Poland
- Branch: Polish Air Force
- Rank: Kapitan (kpt.)

Katarzyna Tomiak-Siemieniewicz (born in 1987 in Niedźwiedz, Poland) is a captain in the Polish Air Force and the first Polish woman to become a fighter pilot. She currently flies the MiG-29 at the 22nd Tactical Air Base near Królewo Malborskie in northern Poland.

== Biography ==
She is a graduate of Eugeniusz Horbaczewski High School (named for Polish pilot and World War II ace Eugeniusz Horbaczewski) in Zielona Góra. Between 2006 and 2011, she studied at the Polish Air Force Academy (dubbed "school of the eaglets") in Dęblin. She graduated with the title of master of engineering. Following her officer promotion to the rank of second lieutenant, she was assigned to the 22nd Tactical Air Base in Malbork as a pilot in the Aviation Action Group's air squadron on 5 December 2011.

Tomiak-Siemieniewicz underwent technical training in the construction and operation of the MiG-29 fighter at the Engineering and Aviation Training Center in Dęblin and completed flight preparation at the 23rd Air Base. She began instructor-aided training flights in May 2012 in the MiG-29UB aircraft. On 18 October 2012, as the first of the members of the Polish Air Force Academy's class of 2011 stationed at Malbork, she completed her first solo flight in the MiG-29G. On 28 November 2014, she received her first combat duty assignment for NATO and the Republic of Poland's defense system. She is the first woman to serve as a fighter pilot in the Polish Air Force.

Tomiak-Siemieniewicz has indicated that she is faced with sexist comments regarding her aspirations, revealing that when she expressed her wish to join the military as a primary school student to a current Polish serviceman, he responded stating that it was not a woman's career.

In 2018, she starred in one of NATO's promotional videos for the "We are NATO" campaign.

As of 2018, Tomiak-Siemieniewicz possessed roughly 500 flight hours in the MiG-29 aircraft and about 750 overall flight hours. By 31 December 2019, she had flown a total of 1300 hours across various aircraft. Though she specializes in operations of the MiG-29, she also flies the Cessna 150, PZL-130 Orlik, TC-1, and PZL TS-11 Iskra.

== Personal life ==
Among friends, Katarzyna Tomiak-Siemieniewicz uses the callsign "Witch". Her husband, also a pilot, is known to the media as "Leszek". She has two brothers.

== Awards and honors ==
- Readers of the online portal lotniczapolska.pl awarded then-second-lieutenant Katarzyna Tomiak-Siemieniewicz with the title "Woman of the Year" in the Lotnicze Orły 2012 plebiscite.
- In January 2013, she was nominated for the "Buzdygany 2012" award of the "Polska Zbrojna" monthly journal.
- On 5 February 2018, she was named Pilot of the Year by the commander of the 22nd Tactical Air Base in Malbork.
- She received 5th place in the "Ten ambitious women in the Polish military 2018" ranking published by the Foundation for Women in Defense and Security (milwomen.pl).
