= Lichnówki =

- Village
- Location within Poland
- Coordinates: 54°6′28″N 18°53′54″E
- Country: Poland
- Voivodeship: Pomeranian
- County: Malbork
- Gmina: Lichnowy
- Population: 291

Lichnówki [lixˈnufki] is a village in the administrative district of Gmina Lichnowy, within Malbork County, Pomeranian Voivodeship, in northern Poland. It lies approximately 2 km (1 mi) south-west of Lichnowy, 13 km (8 mi) north-west of Malbork, and 34 km (21 mi) south-east of the regional capital Gdańsk.

For the history of the region, see History of Pomerania.
