= Lichnówki Pierwsze =

- Village
- Location within Poland
- Coordinates: 54°5′31″N 18°52′23″E
- Country: Poland
- Voivodeship: Pomeranian
- County: Malbork
- Gmina: Lichnowy
- Population: 59

Lichnówki Pierwsze [lixˈnufki ˈpjɛrfʂɛ] is a village in the administrative district of Gmina Lichnowy, within Malbork County, Pomeranian Voivodeship, in northern Poland.

For the history of the region, see History of Pomerania.
