= Złotowo, Malbork County =

Złotowo
- Village
- Location within Poland
- Coordinates: 54°2′N 19°14′E
- Country: Poland
- Voivodeship: Pomeranian
- County: Malbork
- Gmina: Stare Pole
- Population: 312

Złotowo [zwɔˈtɔvɔ] is a village in the administrative district of Gmina Stare Pole, within Malbork County, Pomeranian Voivodeship, in northern Poland.
