= Janówka, Pomeranian Voivodeship =

Janówka
- Village
- Location within Poland
- Coordinates: 54°4′0″N 19°8′1″E
- Country: Poland
- Voivodeship: Pomeranian
- County: Malbork
- Gmina: Stare Pole
- Population: 93

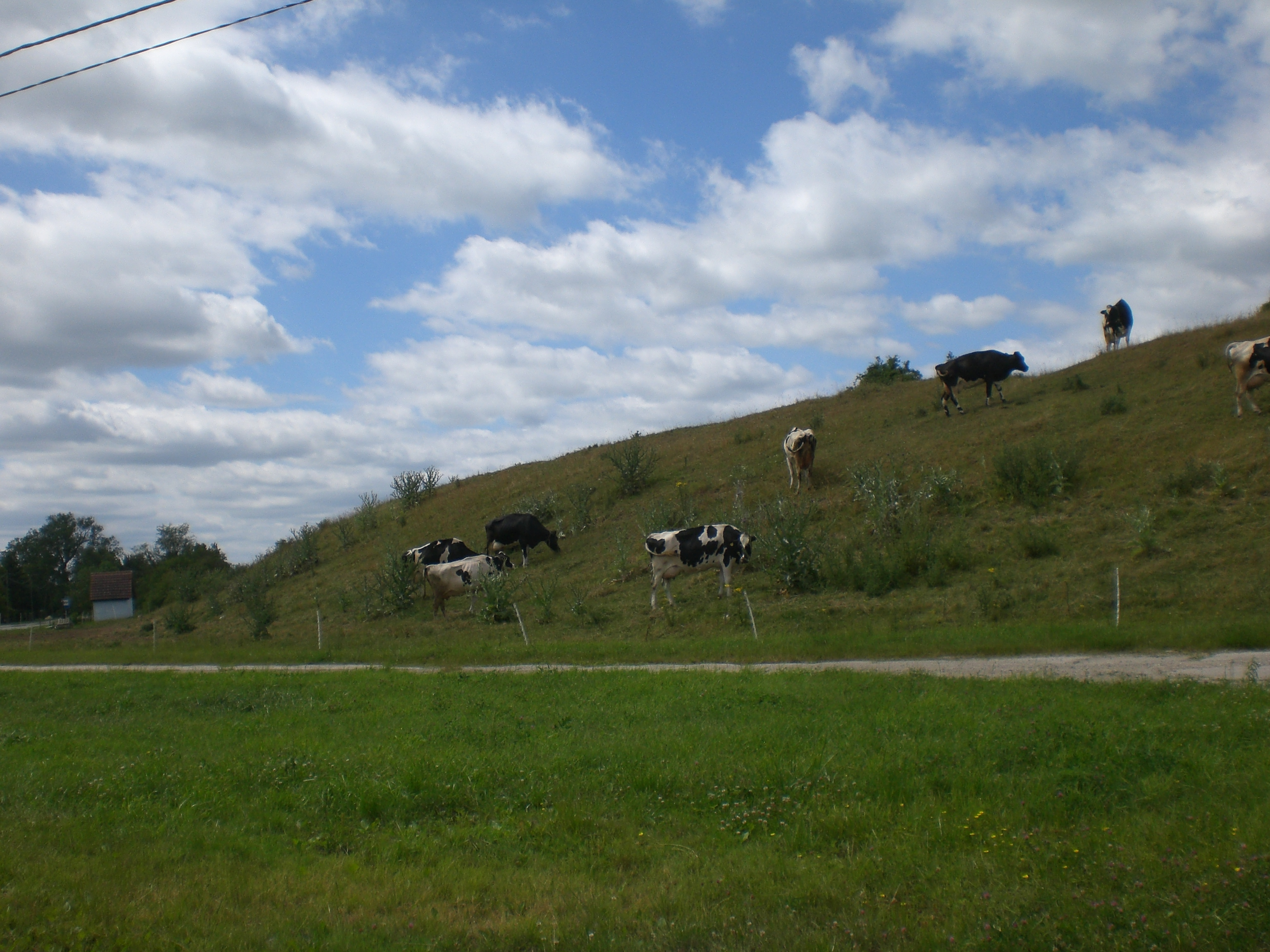
Janówka

Janówka [jaˈnufka] is a village in the administrative district of Gmina Stare Pole, within Malbork County, Pomeranian Voivodeship, in northern Poland.
