= Stożki, Pomeranian Voivodeship =

Stożki
- Settlement
- Location within Poland
- Coordinates: 54°05′32″N 18°57′17″E
- Country: Poland
- Voivodeship: Pomeranian
- County: Malbork
- Gmina: Lichnowy

Stożki [ˈstɔʂki] is a settlement in the administrative district of Gmina Lichnowy, within Malbork County, Pomeranian Voivodeship, in northern Poland.

For the history of the region, see History of Pomerania.
