= Boręty Drugie =

- Village
- Location within Poland
- Coordinates: 54°8′13″N 18°52′38″E
- Country: Poland
- Voivodeship: Pomeranian
- County: Malbork
- Gmina: Lichnowy
- Population: 173

Boręty Drugie [bɔˈrɛntɨ ˈdruɡʲɛ] is a village in the administrative district of Gmina Lichnowy, within Malbork County, Pomeranian Voivodeship, in northern Poland.

Before 1772 the area was part of Kingdom of Poland, in 1772-1919 and 1939-1945, it belonged to Prussia and Germany. For the history of the region, see History of Pomerania.
