= Julius Dickert =

- Born: 25 June 1816; Neuteich, West Prussia, German Confederation
- Died: 12 August 1896 (aged 80); Neuhäuser (Samland), East Prussia, Germany
- Occupations: Teacher; Politician
- Political party: DFP (Progressives)
- Spouse: Louise Friedmann (1828–1901)
- Children: Margarethe Dickert (b. 1852); Georg Dickert (1855–1904)

Julius Dickert (25 June 1816 – 12 August 1896) was a teacher from West Prussia who later entered into politics. After the Unification, he served as a Progressive member of the national Reichstag between 1871 and 1878.

== Life ==
Julius Dickert was born in Neuteich, a small town then in West Prussia. He attended the protestant Gymnasium (secondary school) at Elbing, a short distance to the east, before progressing to the University of Königsberg where, starting in 1837, for three years he studied Protestant Theology then moving on to include Philology. There is a water-colour portrait of Dickert included in the contents listing Pages of Memory, a compilation of student portraits by Wilhelm Schmiedeberg who was a contemporary at Königsberg, although the portrait itself is now missing.

For some time after this he taught at the city's prestigious Burgschule (Castle School). In 1859 he became a city councillor: he then served as leader of the council for the ten years between 1861 and 1871. Julius Dickert participated in the war which opened the way for German political unification after 1870.

Dickert was a founder member of the Progressive Party, established in 1861 to try and preserve the hopes for political liberalism that had been disappointed after the revolutionary stirrings of 1848. The first general election of a united Germany was held in March 1871 and Dickert was elected as the member for Königsberg with nearly 55% of the constituency vote. The Progressive Party ended up with 45 of the 382 seats in the Reichstag and Dickert served on the 7th parliamentary committee during the lifetime of the parliament, which lasted till the start of 1874. He was re-elected for his Königsberg seat in the 1874 general election, this time with more than 56% of the constituency vote, although nationally the Progressive Party's share of the vote was barely changed. He won the seat again in the 1877, now aged 60, with a further increase in vote share. However, the life of the 1877 parliament was cut short at the instigation of the Chancellor, and after the 1878 general election Königsberg was represented in the Reichstag not by a Progressive but by Otto Stellter of the Free Conservative Party.
