= Parwark =

- Village
- Location within Poland
- Coordinates: 54°1′58″N 19°11′31″E
- Country: Poland
- Voivodeship: Pomeranian
- County: Malbork
- Gmina: Stare Pole
- Population: 62

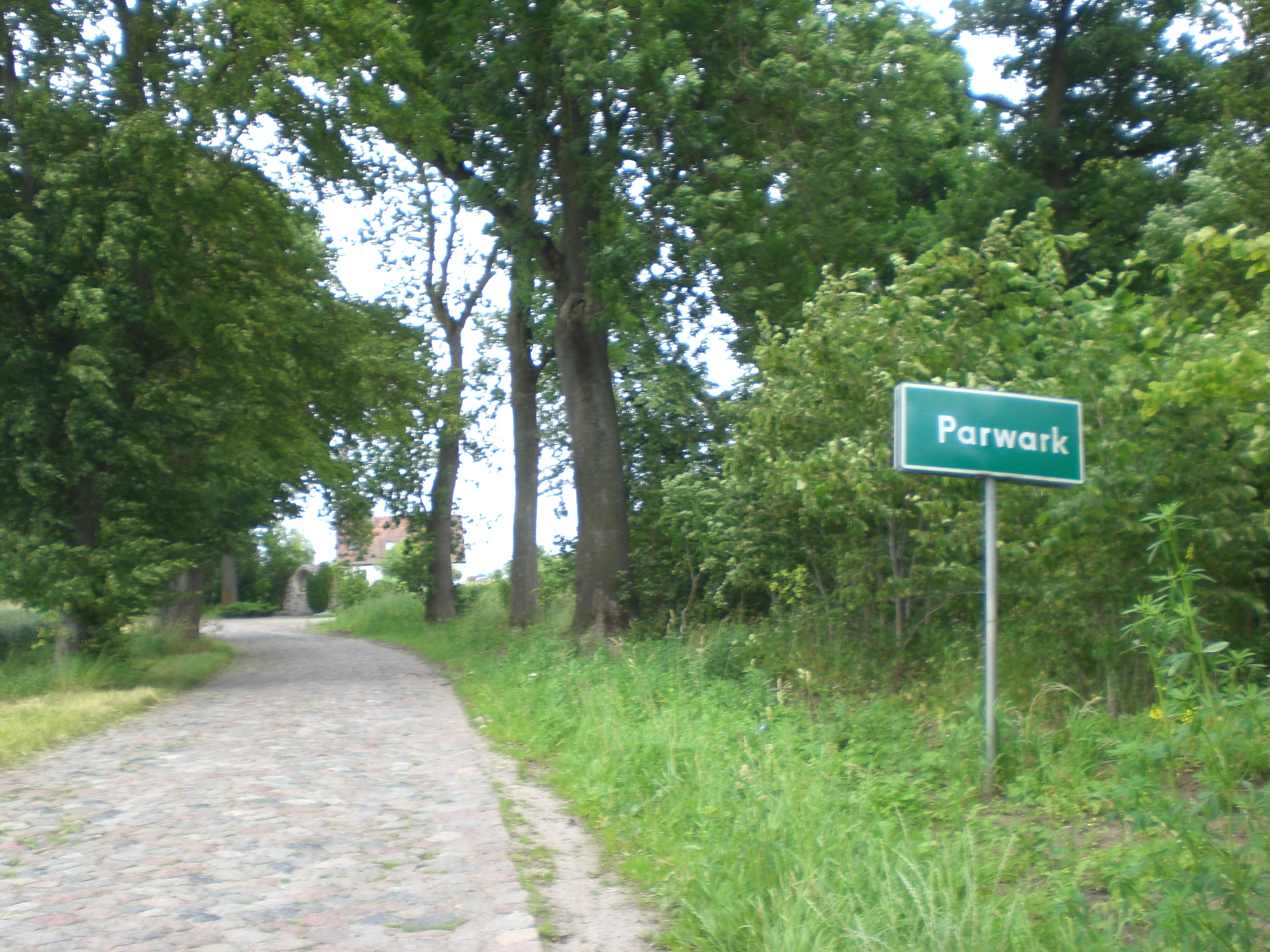
Parwark

Parwark [ˈparvark] is a village in the administrative district of Gmina Stare Pole, within Malbork County, Pomeranian Voivodeship, in northern Poland.

For the history of the region, see History of Pomerania.
