= Klecie, Pomeranian Voivodeship =

Klecie
- Village
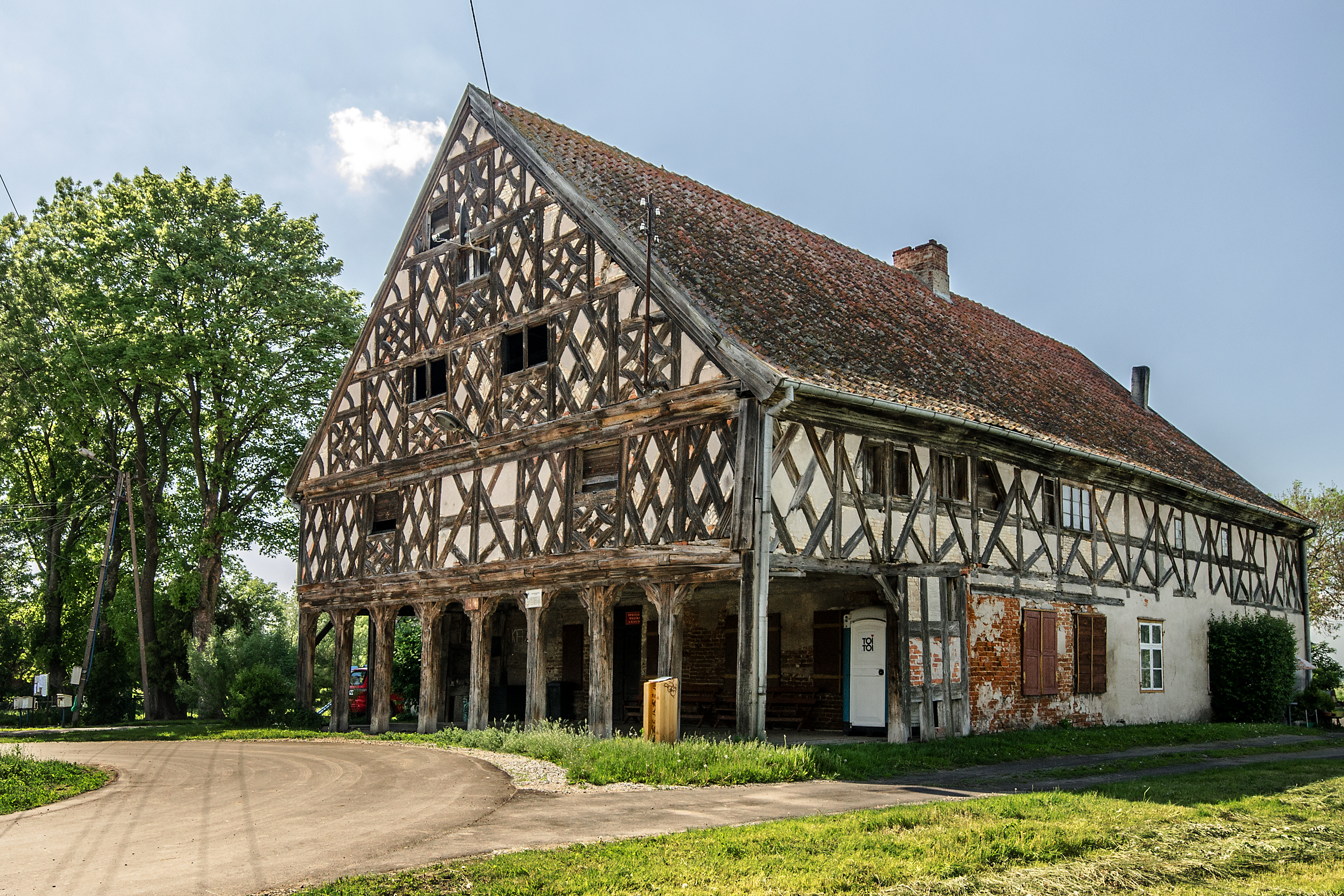
- Vorlaubenhaus in Klecie

- Location within Poland
- Coordinates: 54°1′42″N 19°10′22″E
- Country: Poland
- Voivodeship: Pomeranian
- County: Malbork
- Gmina: Stare Pole

Population
  - Total: 79

Klecie [ˈklɛt͡ɕɛ] is a village in the administrative district of Gmina Stare Pole, within Malbork County, Pomeranian Voivodeship, in northern Poland.

== Notable residents ==
- Hans Wiehler (1930–2003), German botanist
- Franz Wegner (1897-1937)
