= Nowy Staw =

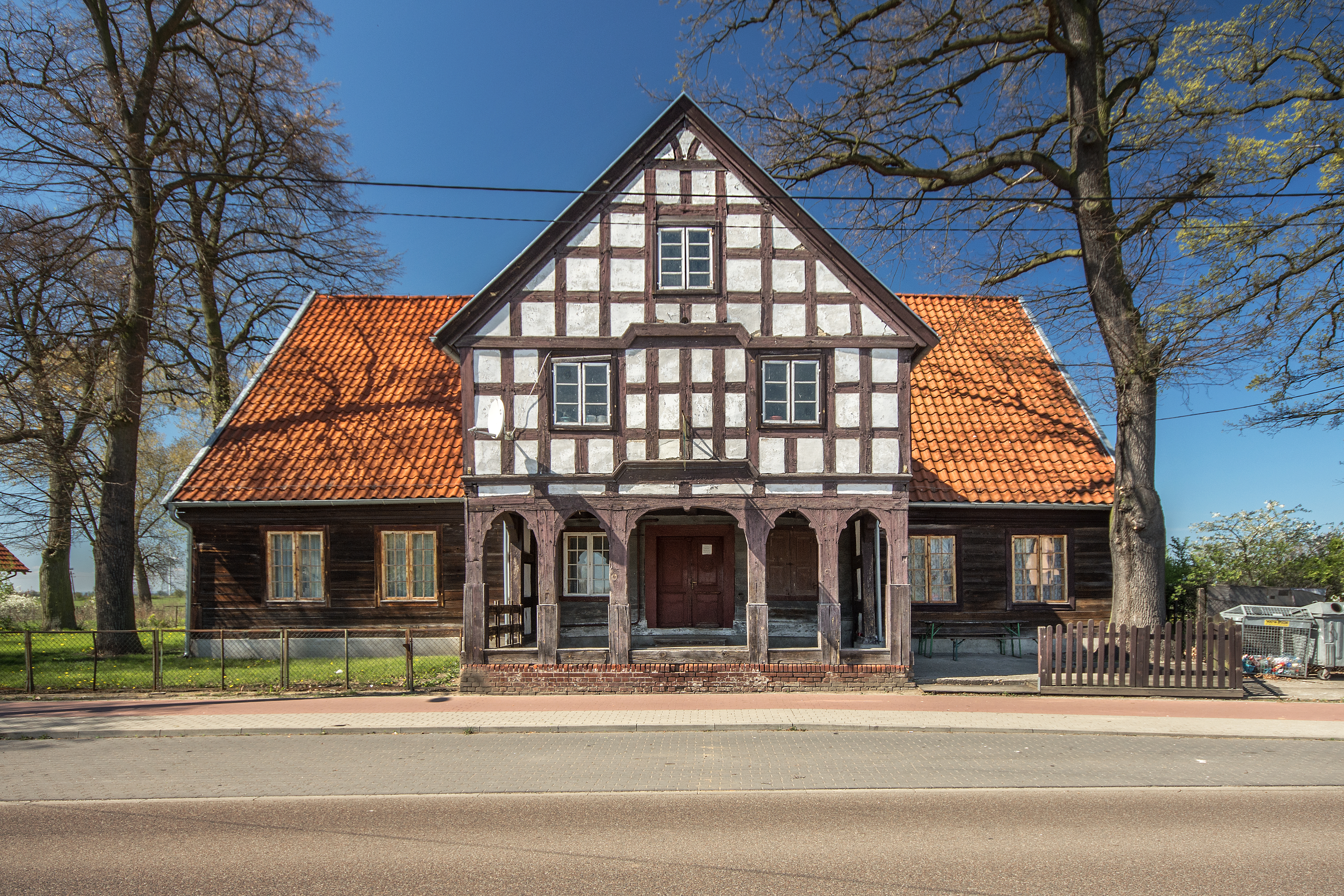
- Mennonite house

- Flag Coat of arms

- Location within Poland
- Coordinates: 54°8′8″N 19°0′48″E
- Country: Poland
- Voivodeship: Pomeranian
- County: Malbork
- Gmina: Nowy Staw
- Established: 14th century
- Town rights: 1343

Government
  - Mayor: Jerzy Szałach

Area
  - Total: 4.65 km^{2} (1.80 sq mi)

Population (2022)
  - Total: 3,766
  - Density: 810/km^{2} (2,100/sq mi)
- Time zone: UTC+1 (CET)
  - Summer (DST): UTC+2 (CEST)
- Postal code: 82-230
- Area code: +48 55
- Car plates: GMB
- Website: nowystaw.pl

Nowy Staw [ˈnɔvɨ ˈstaf] (German: Neuteich; Kashubian: Nowi Stôw, Nytëch; Kocievian: Niytych) is a small town in northern Poland on the Święta river in the Żuławy region, with 3,766 inhabitants (2022), situated in Malbork County in the Pomeranian Voivodeship. The name of the town means New Pond.

== History ==
The oldest part of Nowy Staw is the formerly independent village of Stawiec, north of the town. It was founded in 1316 by the Teutonic Order. Town rights were applied in 1343. In 1409, the Teutonic Knights started producing black gunpowder in the town, and a few decades later in the middle of the fifteenth century merchants from nearby Danzig (Gdańsk) erected an oil mill. In 1454, King Casimir IV Jagiellon incorporated it to the Kingdom of Poland, which was confirmed in the peace treaty of 1466. From 1466 on it was part of the Polish Malbork Voivodeship. During the various Polish–Swedish wars the town was occupied and plundered several times. During the eighteenth century a new district, the "New town" grew up between the existing settlement and the Tuja river. Since that time urban development has taken place in a southerly direction along the right bank of the river.

With the First Partition of Poland in 1772, the town, as Neuteich was annexed by Prussia and had belonged to the Marienburg district in the Prussian Province of West Prussia, which had belonged to the German Reich since 1871. In October–December 1831, some interned Polish infantry units of the November Uprising stopped in the town and its environs on the way to their final internment places. In 1886, the railway line from Szymankowo (Simonsdorf) via Nowy Staw (Neuteich) to Nowy Dwór Gdański (Tiegenhof) was put into operation.

In 1920, as a consequence of the Treaty of Versailles, Neuteich was ceded by Germany to the Free City of Danzig, within which it became part of the district of Großes Werder. With the capture of the Free City of Danzig at the beginning of World War II in 1939, Neuteich came under German rule. On March 11, 1945 it was captured by the Red Army and soon became again part of Poland. In the following years, the remaining German population was expelled in accordance with the Potsdam Agreement and the town was repopulated by Poles.

From 1975 to 1998, it was administratively assigned to Elbląg Voivodeship.

== Architecture ==
Main town buildings:

- Saint Matthew Collegiate church (year 1450)
- Old town market square
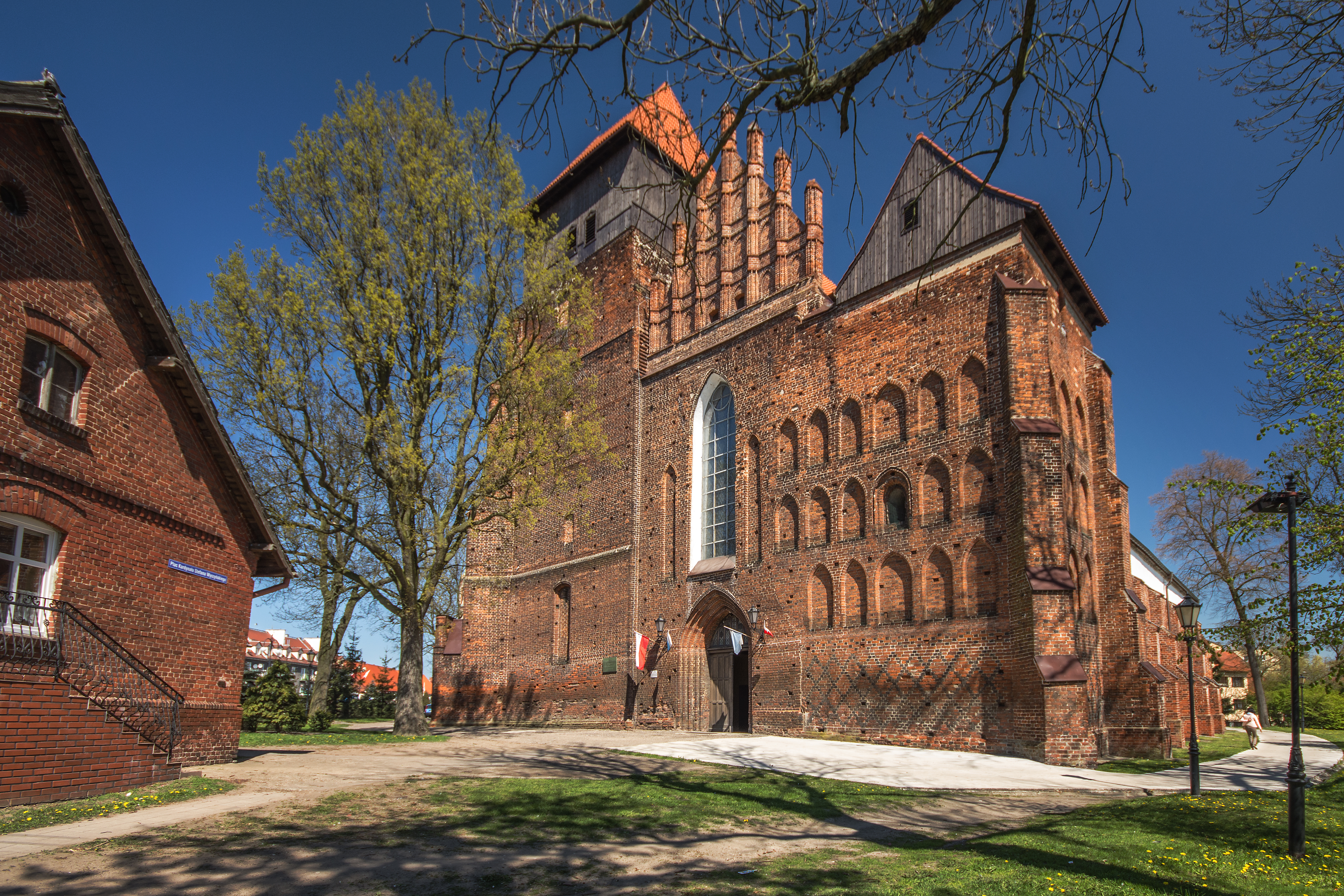
Saint Matthew Collegiate church

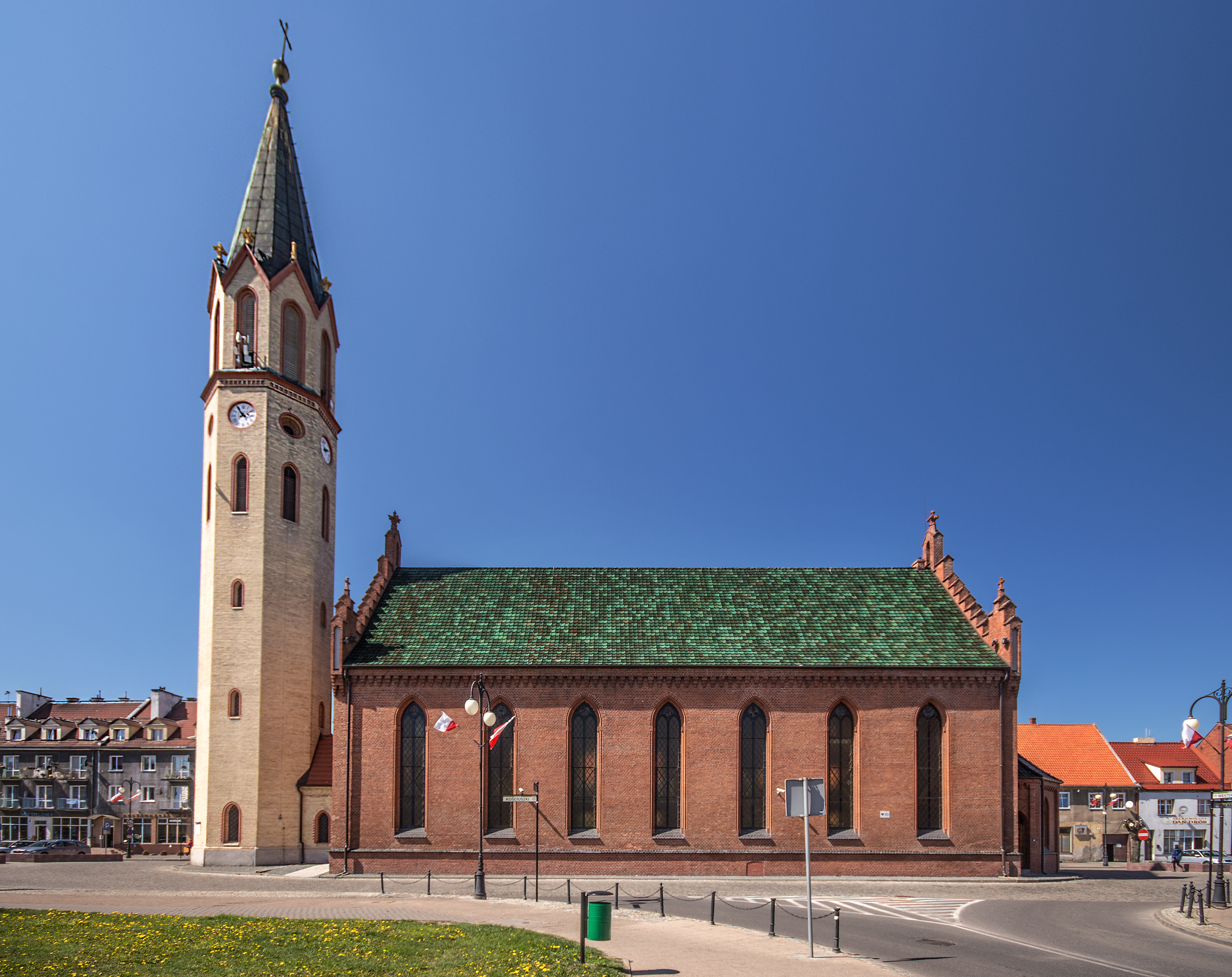
Former church building

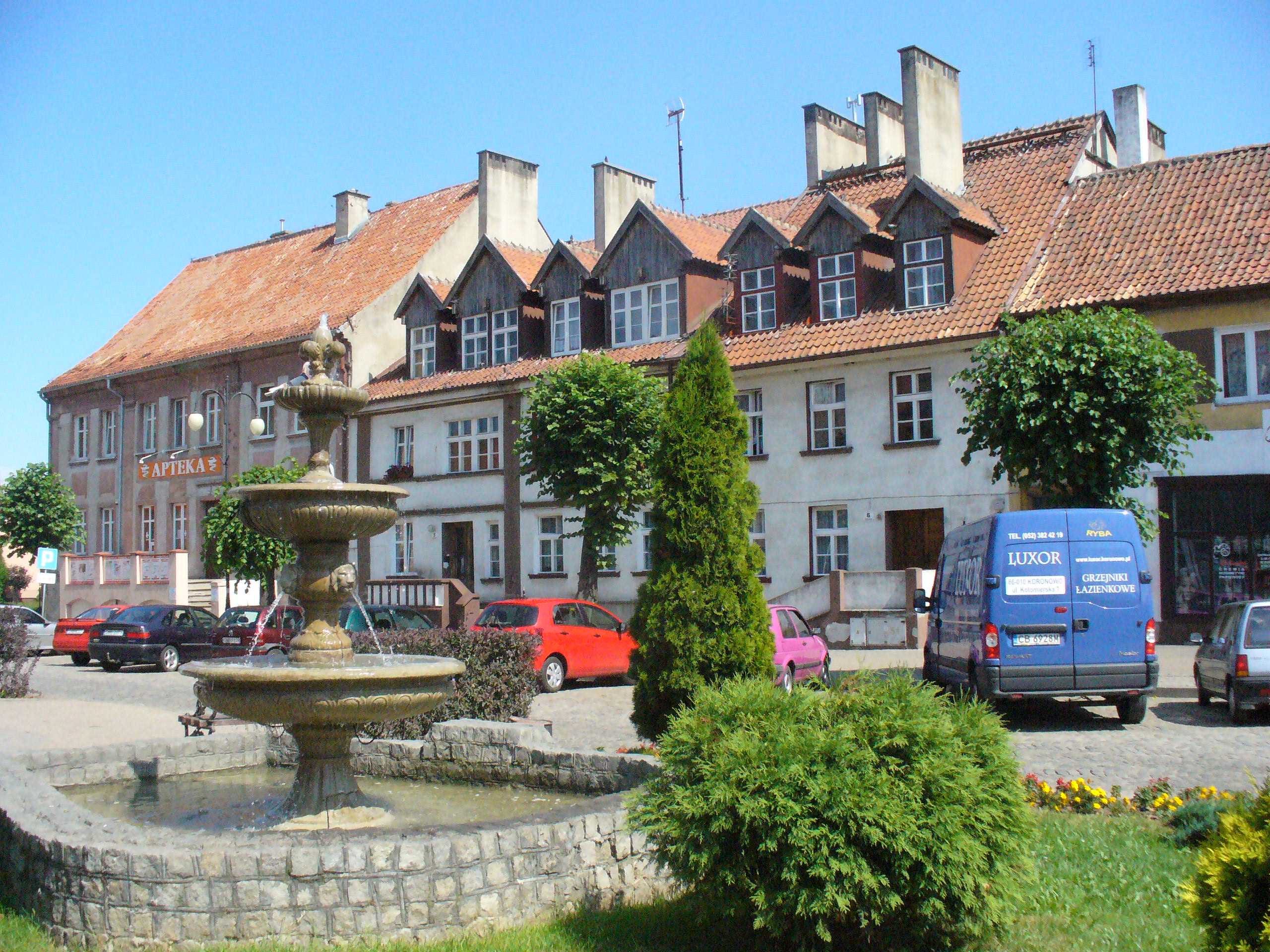
Market square

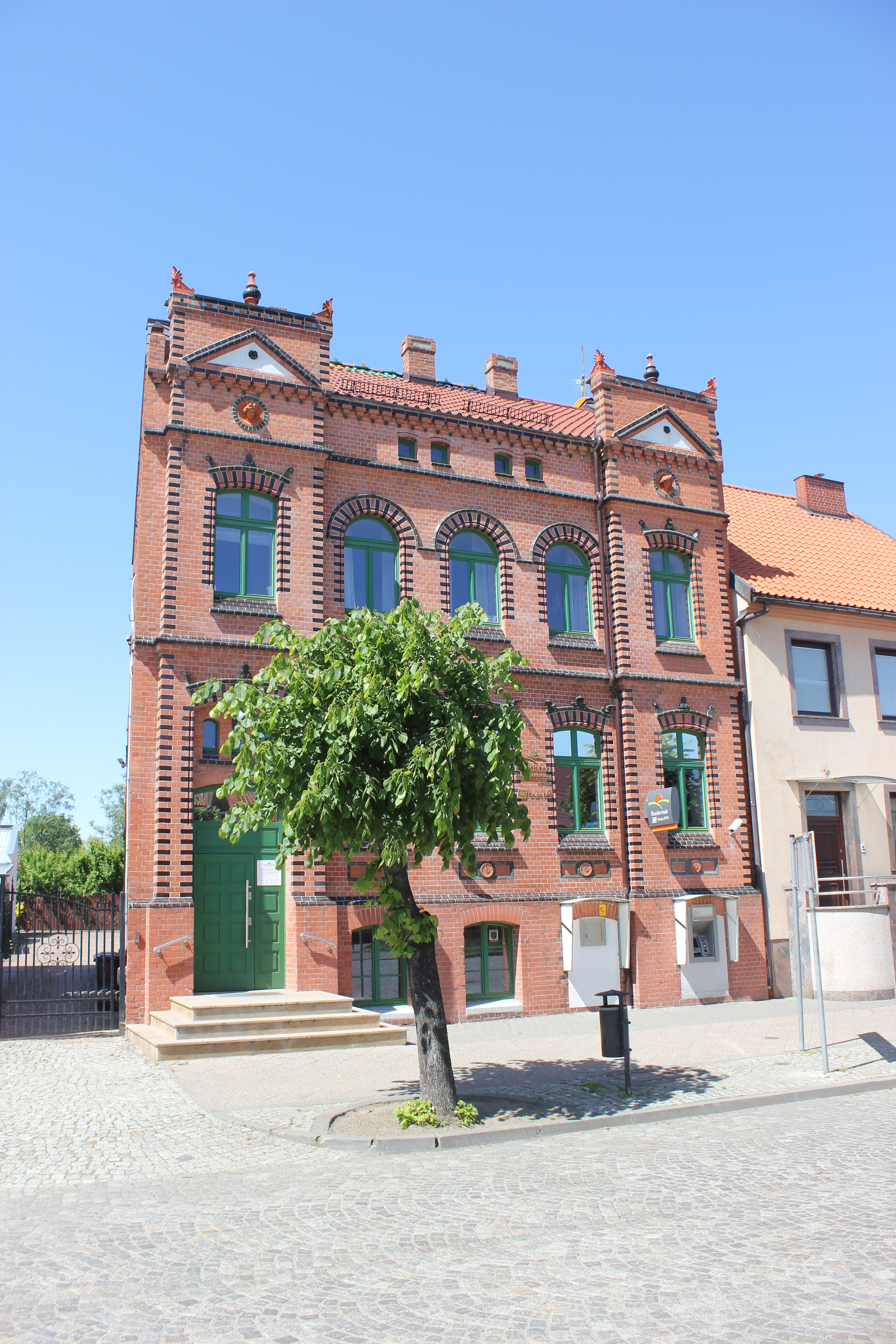
Old townhouse at the Market Square

== Notable residents ==
- Julius Dickert (1816-1896) a teacher and a Progressive member of the national Reichstag between 1871 and 1878
- Walter Reek (1878–1933), mayor of Neuteich (1925-1933)
- Erna Beilhardt (1907–1946) an SS-Aufseherin at several concentration camps and a member of the German Red Cross during the last year of WWII
- Elisabeth Becker (1923–1946), SS concentration camp guard executed for war crimes
- Tadeusz Cymański (born 1955) a Polish conservative politician.
