= Nowa Cerkiew =

Nowa Cerkiew may refer to the following places:

- Nowa Cerkiew, Chojnice County in Pomeranian Voivodeship (north Poland)
- Nowa Cerkiew, Gmina Ostaszewo, Nowy Dwór County in Pomeranian Voivodeship (north Poland)
- Nowa Cerkiew, Tczew County in Pomeranian Voivodeship (north Poland)
