= Krzyżanowo, Pomeranian Voivodeship =

Krzyżanowo
- Village
- Location within Poland
- Coordinates: 54°2′42″N 19°12′16″E
- Country: Poland
- Voivodeship: Pomeranian
- County: Malbork
- Gmina: Stare Pole
- Population: 356

Krzyżanowo [kʂɨʐaˈnɔvɔ] is a village in the administrative district of Gmina Stare Pole, within Malbork County, Pomeranian Voivodeship, in northern Poland.
