= Janowo, Malbork County =

Janowo
- Village
- Location within Poland
- Coordinates: 54°4′41″N 19°10′9″E
- Country: Poland
- Voivodeship: Pomeranian
- County: Malbork
- Gmina: Stare Pole

Janowo [jaˈnɔvɔ] is a village in the administrative district of Gmina Stare Pole, within Malbork County, Pomeranian Voivodeship, in northern Poland.

For the history of the region, see History of Pomerania.
