= Dąbrowa, Malbork County =

Dąbrowa
- Village
- Location within Poland
- Coordinates: 54°6′56″N 18°52′2″E
- Country: Poland
- Voivodeship: Pomeranian
- County: Malbork
- Gmina: Lichnowy
- Population: 244

Dąbrowa [dɔmˈbrɔva] is a village in the administrative district of Gmina Lichnowy, within Malbork County, Pomeranian Voivodeship, in northern Poland.

Before 1772 the area was part of Kingdom of Poland, in 1772-1919 and 1939-1945 to Prussia and Germany, and in 1920-1939 to Free City of Danzig. For the history of the region, see History of Pomerania.
