= Lisewo Malborskie =

- Village
- Location within Poland
- Coordinates: 54°5′51″N 18°49′47″E
- Country: Poland
- Voivodeship: Pomeranian
- County: Malbork
- Gmina: Lichnowy
- Population: 1,210

Lisewo Malborskie [liˈsɛvɔ malˈbɔrskʲɛ] is a village in the administrative district of Gmina Lichnowy, within Malbork County, Pomeranian Voivodeship, in northern Poland.

== Notable residents ==
- Jakob Sigismund Beck (1761–1840), German philosopher
