= Kikojty =

- Village
- Location within Poland
- Coordinates: 54°3′27″N 19°14′39″E
- Country: Poland
- Voivodeship: Pomeranian
- County: Malbork
- Gmina: Stare Pole
- Population: 34

Kikojty [kiˈkɔi̯tɨ] is a village in the administrative district of Gmina Stare Pole, within Malbork County, Pomeranian Voivodeship, in northern Poland.
