= Parszewo =

- Village
- Location within Poland
- Coordinates: 54°8′27″N 18°56′18″E
- Country: Poland
- Voivodeship: Pomeranian
- County: Malbork
- Gmina: Lichnowy
- Population: 276

Parszewo [parˈʂɛvɔ] is a village in the administrative district of Gmina Lichnowy, within Malbork County, Pomeranian Voivodeship, in northern Poland.

For the history of the region, see History of Pomerania.
