= Kraszewo, Pomeranian Voivodeship =

Kraszewo
- Village
- Location within Poland
- Coordinates: 54°2′31″N 19°10′45″E
- Country: Poland
- Voivodeship: Pomeranian
- County: Malbork
- Gmina: Stare Pole
- Population: 162

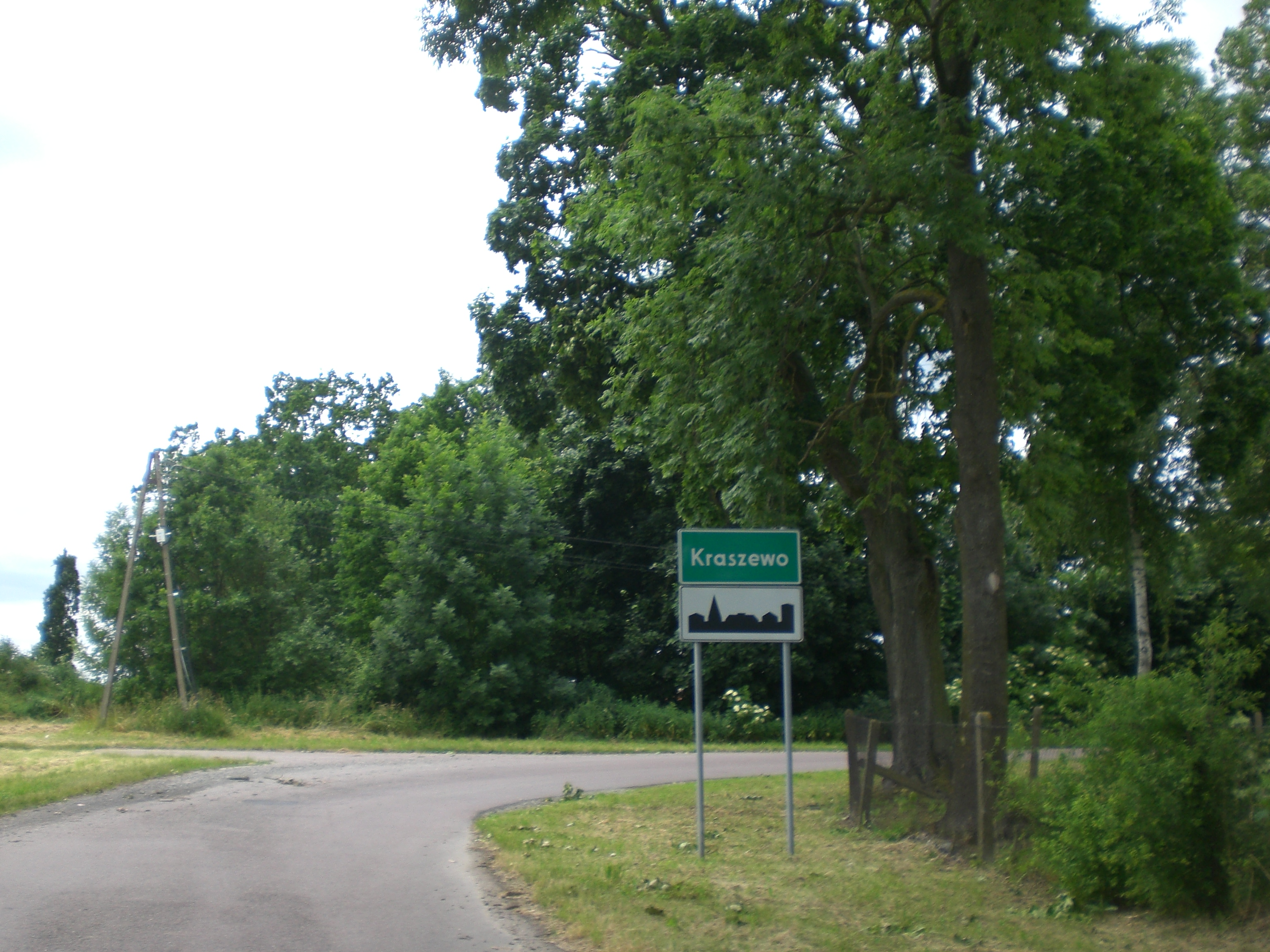
Kraszewo

Kraszewo [kraˈʂɛvɔ] is a village in the administrative district of Gmina Stare Pole, within Malbork County, Pomeranian Voivodeship, in northern Poland.

For the history of the region, see History of Pomerania.
