= Christian Jakob Kraus =

German linguist (1753–1807)

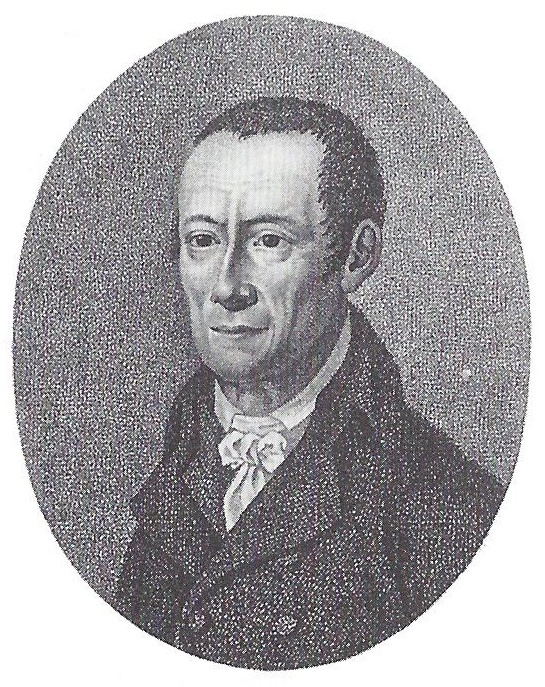
- Born: 27 July 1753; Osterode, Kingdom of Prussia
- Died: 25 August 1807 (aged 54); Königsberg, East Prussia, Kingdom of Prussia

Education
- Education: University of Königsberg; University of Göttingen
- Academic advisor: Immanuel Kant

Philosophical work
- Era: 18th-century philosophy
- Region: Western philosophy
- School: Cameralism
- Institutions: University of Königsberg
- Notable students: Jakob Sigismund Beck
- Main interests: Practical philosophy Economics; Historical linguistics

Christian Jakob Kraus (German: [ˈkʁɪsti̯a(ː)n ˈjaːkɔp ˈkʁaʊs]; 27 July 1753 – 25 August 1807) was a German comparative and historical linguist.

== Biography ==
A native of Osterode, Kraus studied at the universities of Königsberg and Göttingen. In 1782 he became a professor of practical philosophy and cameralism at Königsberg. A student of Immanuel Kant, Kraus was famous for importing the ideas of Adam Smith into the German academic scene. He was also a librarian of the Königsberg Public Library from 1786 to 1804. Kraus encouraged the East Prussian officials and nobility to improve rural conditions in the province; some of his ideas were later adapted in the era of Prussian reforms. Kraus died in Königsberg in 1807.
