= Królewo, Pomeranian Voivodeship =

Królewo
- Village
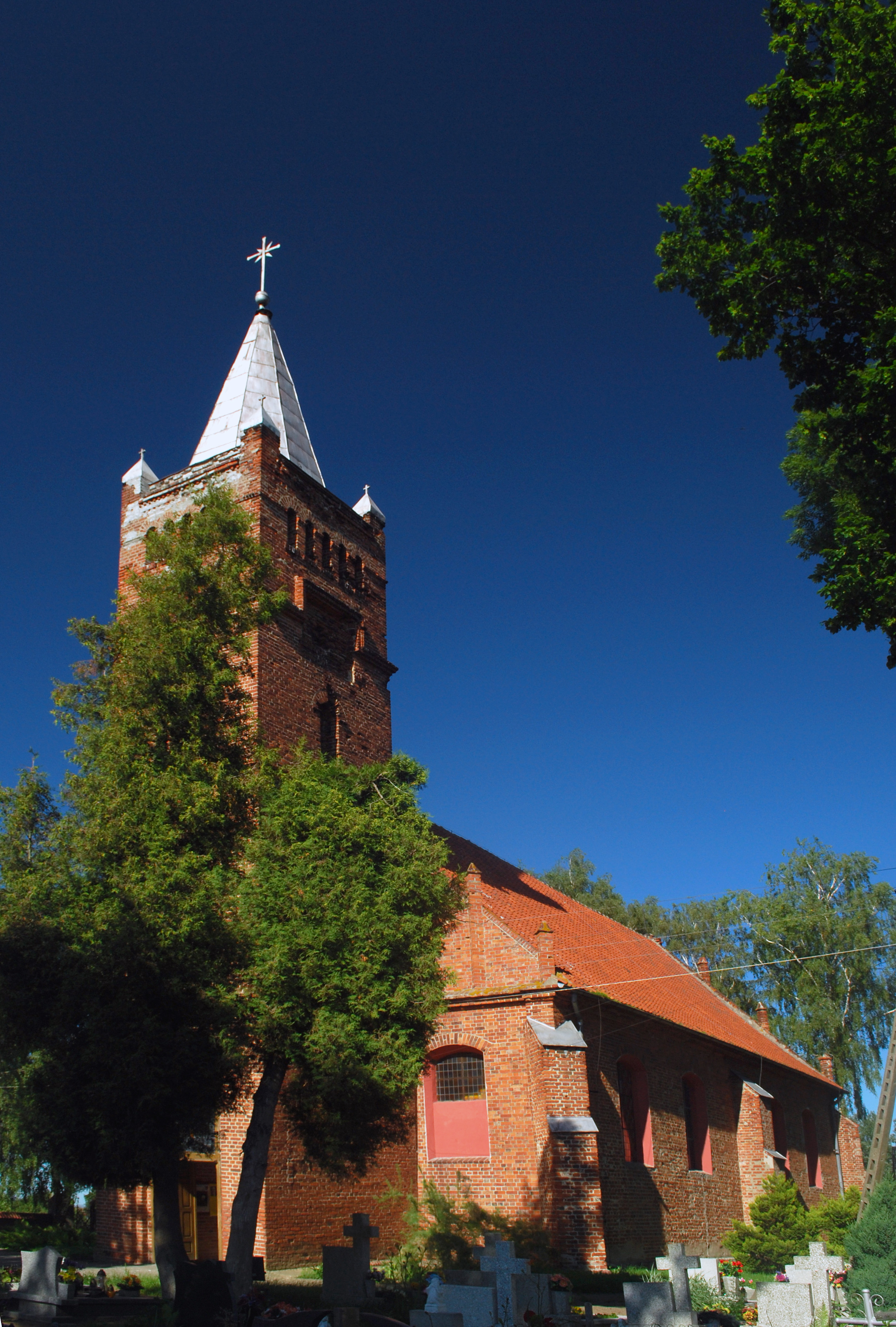
- Saint Nicholas church in Królewo

- Location within Poland
- Coordinates: 54°2′29″N 19°8′29″E
- Country: Poland
- Voivodeship: Pomeranian
- County: Malbork
- Gmina: Stare Pole
- Population: 382
- Time zone: UTC+1 (CET)
  - Summer (DST): UTC+2 (CEST)
- Vehicle registration: GMB

Królewo [kruˈlɛvɔ] is a village in the administrative district of Gmina Stare Pole, within Malbork County, Pomeranian Voivodeship, in northern Poland.

== History ==
The village was part of Poland until 1772, when it was annexed by Prussia in the First Partition of Poland, from 1871 to 1945 it was part of Germany. During World War II, the Germans established and operated a forced labour subcamp of the German military prison in Grudziądz in German-occupied Poland. After Germany's defeat in the war in 1945 the village was restored to Poland.
