= Piaskowiec, Pomeranian Voivodeship =

Piaskowiec
- Village
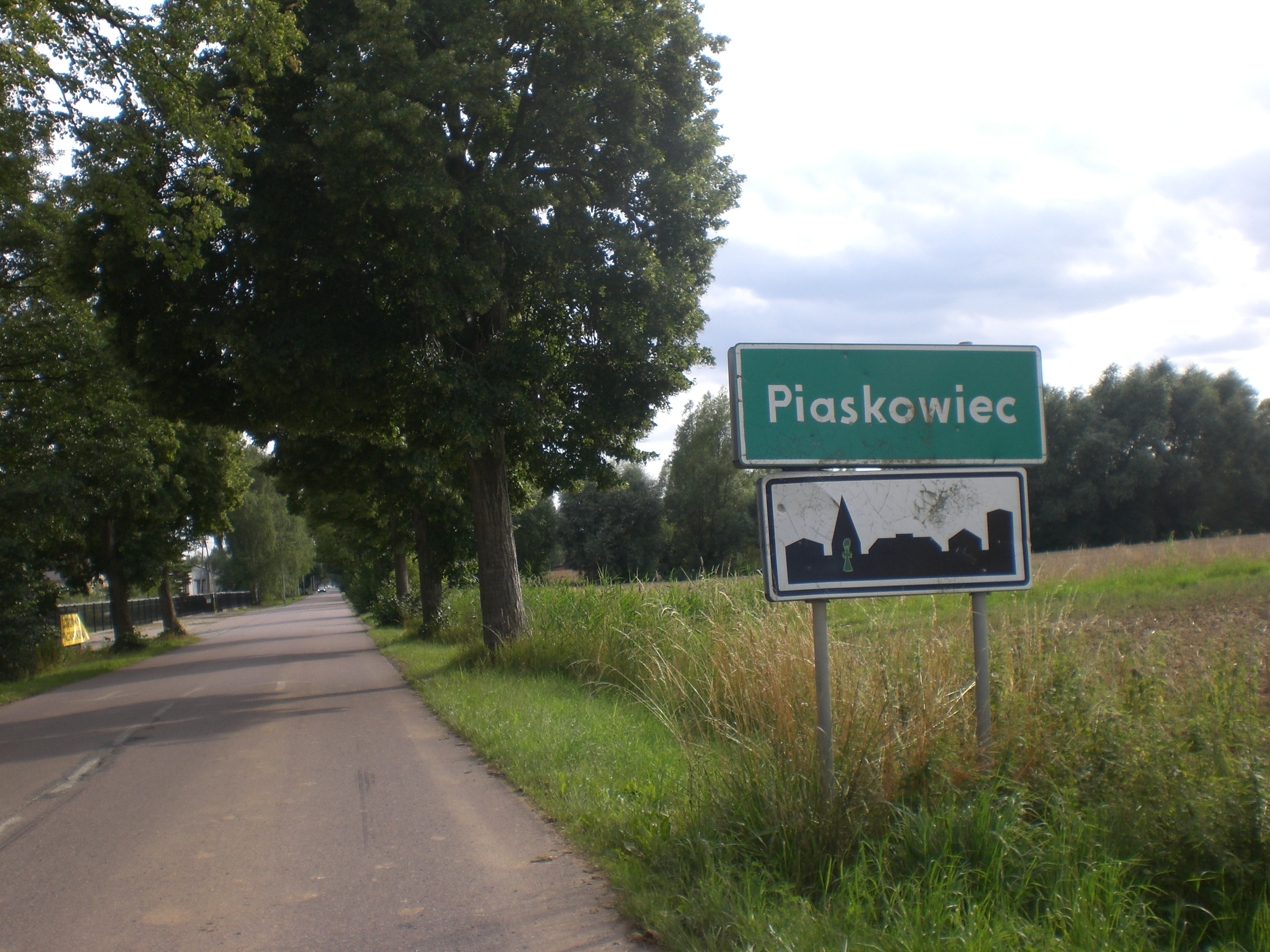

- Location within Poland
- Coordinates: 54°13′34″N 18°57′23″E
- Country: Poland
- Voivodeship: Pomeranian
- County: Nowy Dwór
- Gmina: Ostaszewo

Piaskowiec [pjasˈkɔvjɛt͡s] is a village in the administrative district of Gmina Ostaszewo, within Nowy Dwór County, Pomeranian Voivodeship, in northern Poland.

Before 1772 the area was part of Kingdom of Poland, 1772–1919 Prussia and Germany, 1920–1939 Free City of Danzig, 1939 – February 1945 Nazi Germany. For the history of the region, see History of Pomerania.
