= Gmina Stare Pole =

Gmina Stare Pole Stare Pole Commune
- Gmina
- Coat of arms
- Interactive map of Gmina Stare Pole
- Coordinates (Stare Pole): 54°3′16″N 19°11′59″E
- Country: Poland
- Voivodeship: Pomeranian
- County: Malbork
- Seat: Stare Pole

Area
  - Total: 79.72 km^{2} (30.78 sq mi)

Population (2006)
  - Total: 4,595
  - Density: 57.64/km^{2} (149.3/sq mi)
- Website: http://www.starepole.pl

Gmina Stare Pole is a rural gmina (administrative district) in Malbork County, Pomeranian Voivodeship, in northern Poland. Its seat is the village of Stare Pole, which lies approximately 12 kilometres (7 mi) east of Malbork and 51 km (32 mi) south-east of the regional capital Gdańsk.

The gmina covers an area of 79.72 square kilometres (30.8 sq mi), and as of 2006 its total population is 4,595.

== Villages ==
Gmina Stare Pole contains the villages and settlements of Janówka, Janowo, Kaczynos, Kaczynos-Kolonia, Kikojty, Kławki, Klecie, Krasnołęka, Kraszewo, Królewo, Królewo Malborskie, Krzyżanowo, Leklowy, Letniki, Parwark, Stare Pole, Szaleniec, Szlagnowo, Ząbrowo, Zarzecze and Złotowo.

== Neighbouring gminas ==
Gmina Stare Pole is bordered by the gminas of Dzierzgoń, Gronowo Elbląskie, Malbork, Markusy, Nowy Staw and Stary Targ.
