= Nowa Kościelnica =

- Village
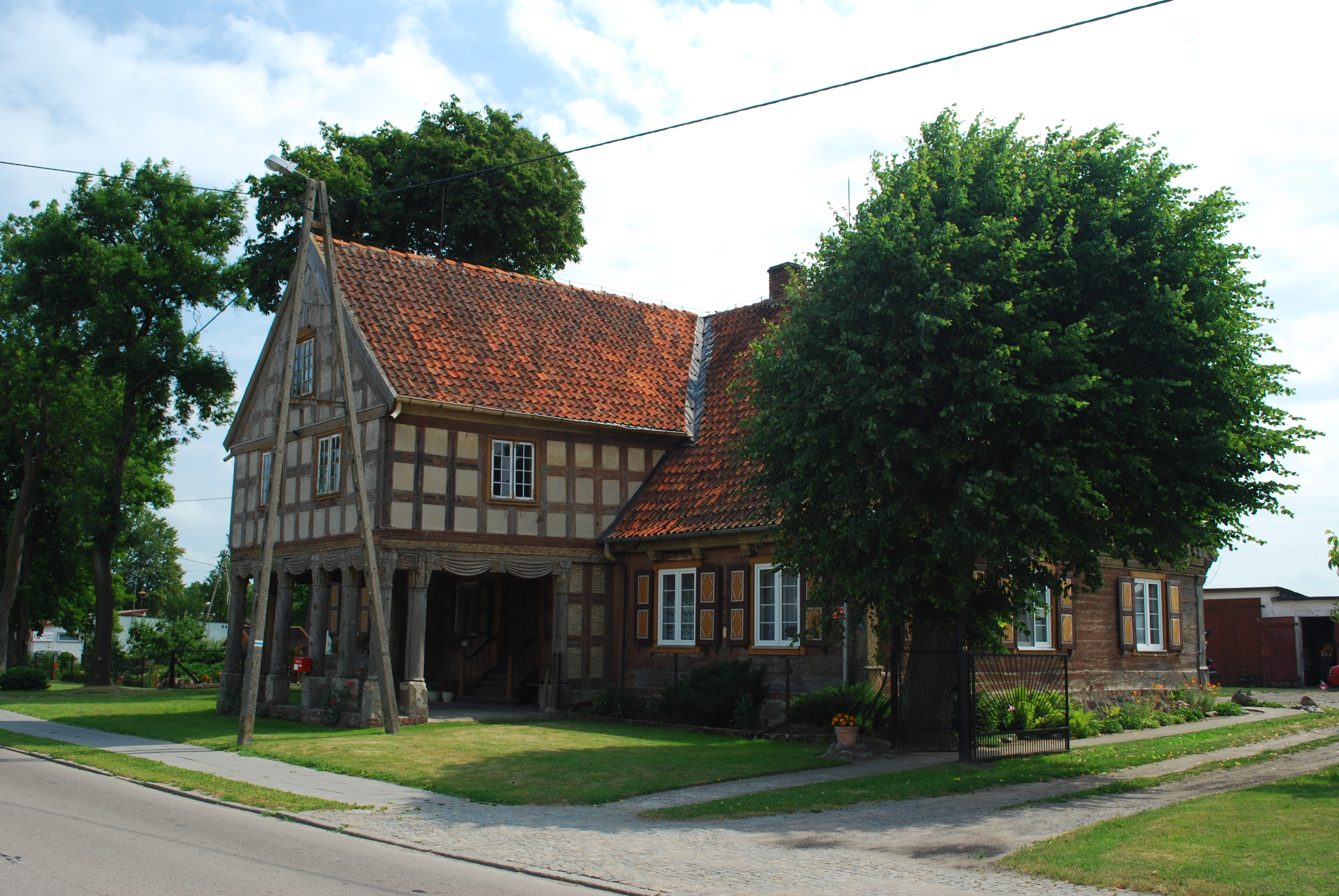
- One of two Mennonite houses and the oldest standing house in Poland

- Location within Poland
- Coordinates: 54°14′58″N 18°58′44″E
- Country: Poland
- Voivodeship: Pomeranian
- County: Nowy Dwór
- Gmina: Ostaszewo
- Population: 296

Nowa Kościelnica [ˈnɔva kɔɕt͡ɕɛlˈnit͡sa] is a village in the administrative district of Gmina Ostaszewo, within Nowy Dwór County, Pomeranian Voivodeship, in northern Poland.

Before 1772 the area was part of Kingdom of Poland, 1772-1919 Prussia and Germany, 1920-1939 Free City of Danzig, 1939 - February 1945 Nazi Germany. For the history of the region, see History of Pomerania.

Nowa Kościelnica is famed for its two Mennonite houses, which date back hundreds of years. They are considered to be the oldest standing houses in Poland.
