= Szymankowo =

- Village
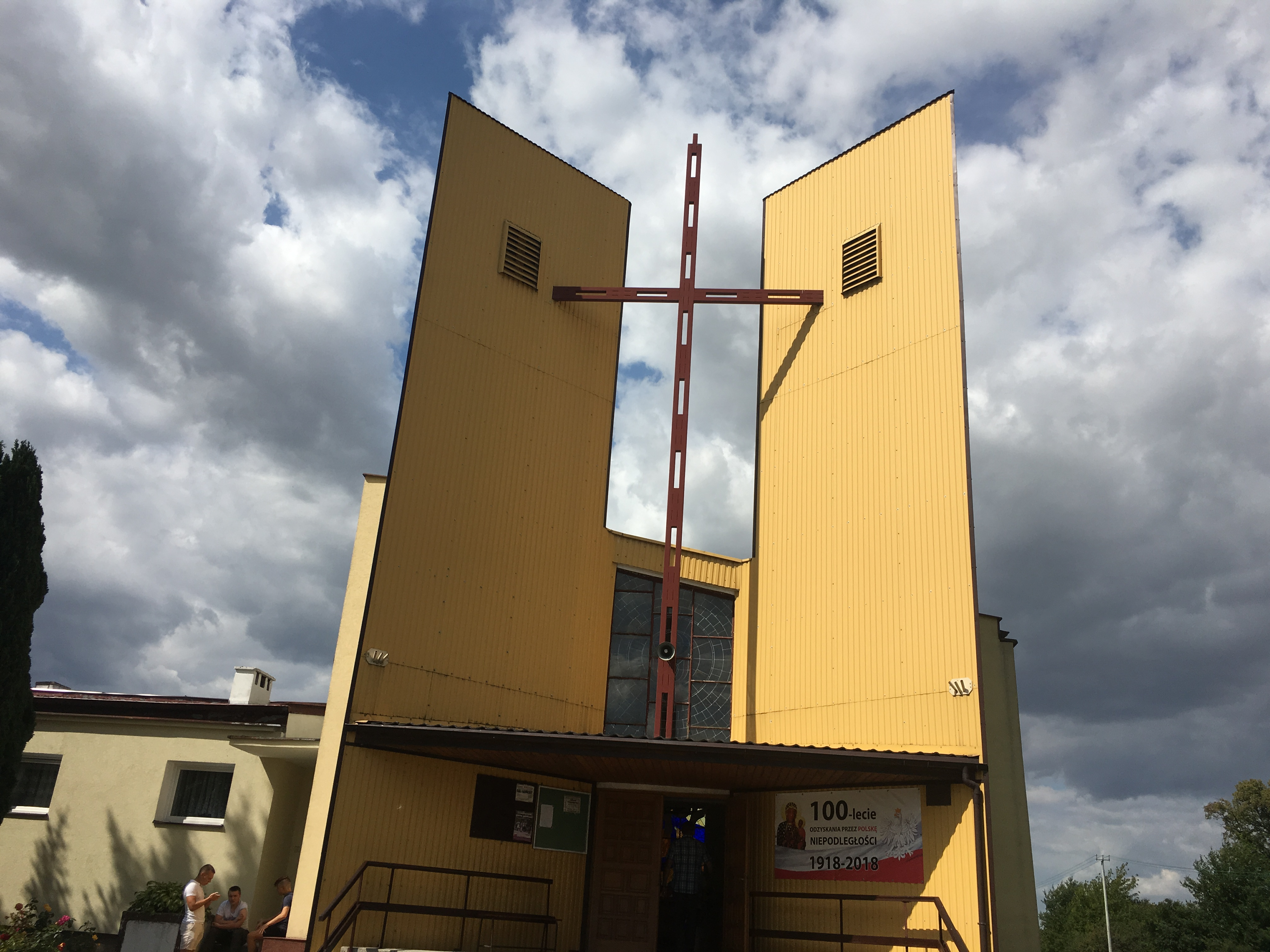
- Saint Florian church

- Location within Poland
- Coordinates: 54°4′23″N 18°55′23″E
- Country: Poland
- Voivodeship: Pomeranian
- County: Malbork
- Gmina: Lichnowy
- Population: 744
- Time zone: UTC+1 (CET)
  - Summer (DST): UTC+2 (CEST)

Szymankowo (Polish: [ʂɨmanˈkɔvɔ]) is a village in the administrative district of Gmina Lichnowy, within Malbork County, Pomeranian Voivodeship, in northern Poland.

== History ==
Before 1772, the area was part of Kingdom of Poland. From 1772 to 1871, it belonged to the Prussia. From 1871 to 1919, it was a part of Germany. From 1920 to 1939, it belonged to Free City of Danzig. From 1939 to 1945, it was under Nazi Germany. In 1945, it was returned to Poland.

=== World War II ===
In interwar period, Szymankowo was in the territory of Free City of Danzig. Hours before the German invasion of Poland and World War II, on September 1, 1939, the Germans sent two trains with soldiers to capture bridges at Tczew, disguised as freight trains. Polish railroaders on Szymankowo station directed the first train to a blind track, halting the assault. In revenge, local Germans SA units murdered 23 Poles, including railmen, customs officers and their families, including one pregnant woman, at the local train station.
