= Palczewo, Pomeranian Voivodeship =

Palczewo
- Village
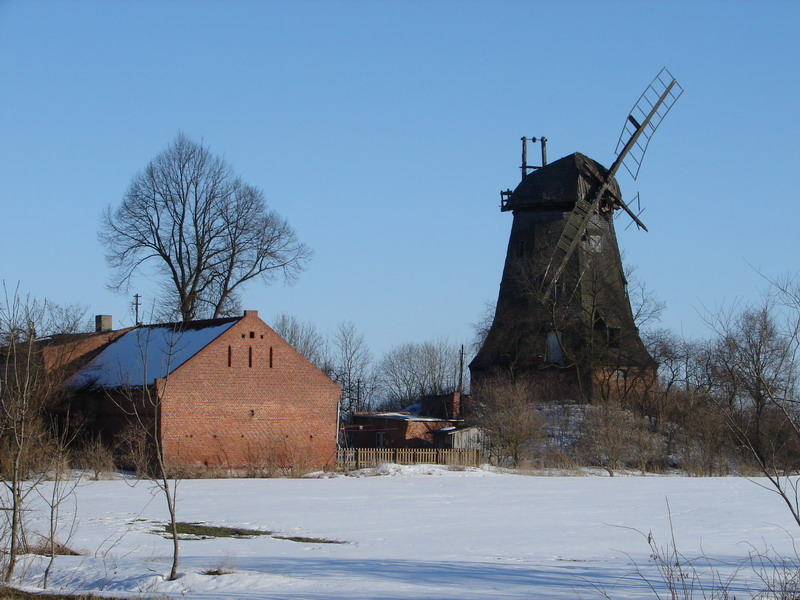
- West side of a windmill in Palczewo

- Location within Poland
- Coordinates: 54°10′16″N 18°51′28″E
- Country: Poland
- Voivodeship: Pomeranian
- County: Nowy Dwór
- Gmina: Ostaszewo
- Population: 331

Palczewo [palˈt͡ʂɛvɔ] is a village in the administrative district of Gmina Ostaszewo, within Nowy Dwór County, Pomeranian Voivodeship, in northern Poland.

Before 1772 the area was part of Kingdom of Poland, 1772-1919 Prussia and Germany, 1920-1939 Free City of Danzig, 1939 - February 1945 Nazi Germany. For the history of the region, see History of Pomerania.
