= Stare Pole =

- Village
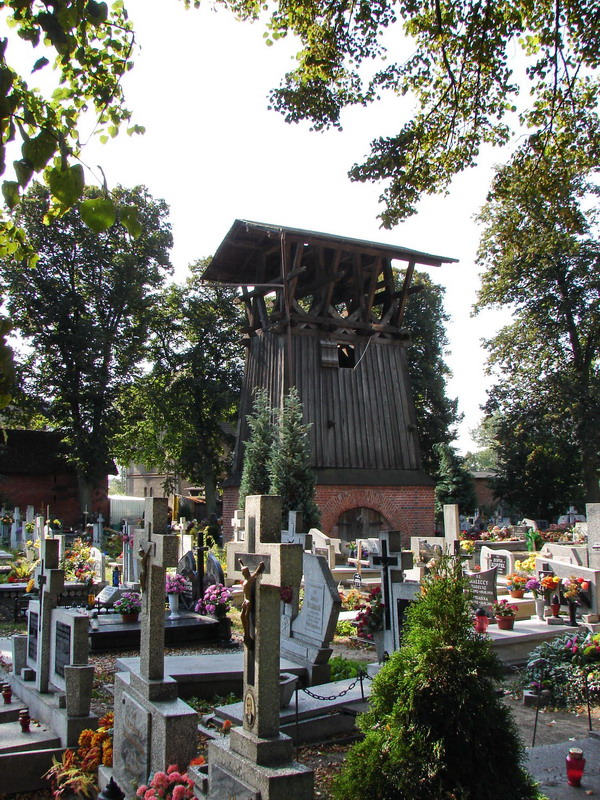
- Old belfry in the village

- Location within Poland
- Coordinates: 54°3′16″N 19°11′59″E
- Country: Poland
- Voivodeship: Pomeranian
- County: Malbork
- Gmina: Stare Pole

Population
  - Total: 1,834
- Website: starepole.pl

Stare Pole ([ˈstarɛ ˈpɔlɛ]; German: Altfelde) is a village in Malbork County, Pomeranian Voivodeship, in northern Poland. It is the seat of the gmina (administrative district) called Gmina Stare Pole.

The German palaeontologist Alfred Eisenack, discoverer of chitinozoans, was born here in 1891.
