= Gmina Ostaszewo =

Gmina Ostaszewo Ostaszewo Commune
- Gmina
- Coat of arms

- Location within Pomeranian Voivodeship Location within Poland
- Coordinates (Ostaszewo): 54°13′6″N 18°56′50″E
- Country: Poland
- Voivodeship: Pomeranian
- County: Nowy Dwór
- Seat: Ostaszewo

Area
  - Total: 60.65 km^{2} (23.42 sq mi)

Population (2006)
  - Total: 3,204
  - Density: 52.83/km^{2} (136.8/sq mi)
- Website: http://www.ostaszewo.pl

Gmina Ostaszewo is a rural gmina (administrative district) in Nowy Dwór County, Pomeranian Voivodeship, in northern Poland. Its seat is the village of Ostaszewo, which lies approximately 12 kilometres (7 mi) west of Nowy Dwór Gdański and 27 km (17 mi) south-east of the regional capital Gdańsk.

The gmina covers an area of 60.65 square kilometres (23.4 sq mi), and as of 2006 its total population is 3,204.

== Villages ==
Gmina Ostaszewo contains the villages and settlements of Gniazdowo, Groblica, Jeziernik, Komarówka, Lubiszynek Pierwszy, Nowa Cerkiew, Nowa Kościelnica, Ostaszewo, Palczewo, Piaskowiec and Pułkownikówka.

== Neighbouring gminas ==
Gmina Ostaszewo is bordered by the gminas of Cedry Wielkie, Lichnowy, Nowy Dwór Gdański, Nowy Staw, Stegna and Suchy Dąb.
