= 22nd Air Base =

Military airport in Pomeranian Voivodeship, Poland

22nd Air Base
- Polish: 22. Baza Lotnicza
- Malbork, Pomeranian Voivodeship in Poland
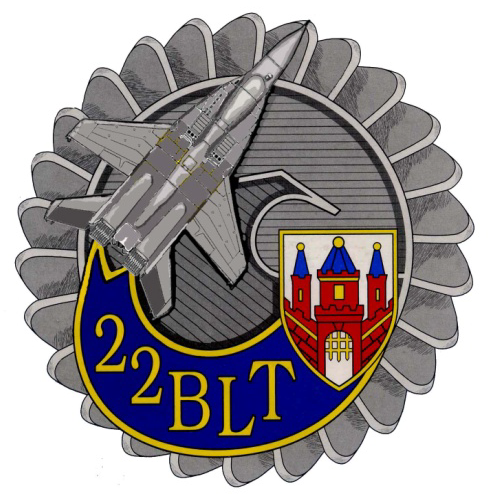

Site information
- Type: Air base
- Owner: Ministry of National Defence
- Operator: Polish Air Force

Location
- Shown within Poland 22nd Air Base (Europe)
- Coordinates: 54°01′36″N 19°08′11″E

Site history
- Built: 1929
- In use: 1929 - current

Airfield information
- Identifiers: ICAO: EPMB
Runways
Direction	Length and surface
08/26	2,490 metres (8,169 ft) Asphalt

The 22nd Air Base (Polish: 22. Baza Lotnicza) is a Polish Air Force air base east of Malbork, Poland, near the village of Królewo Malborskie. It was officially constituted on 1 January 2001, replacing the disbanded 41st Fighter Aviation Regiment. The main unit based there is the 41st Air Tactical Squadron flying Mikoyan MiG-29A/UB fighters.

== History ==
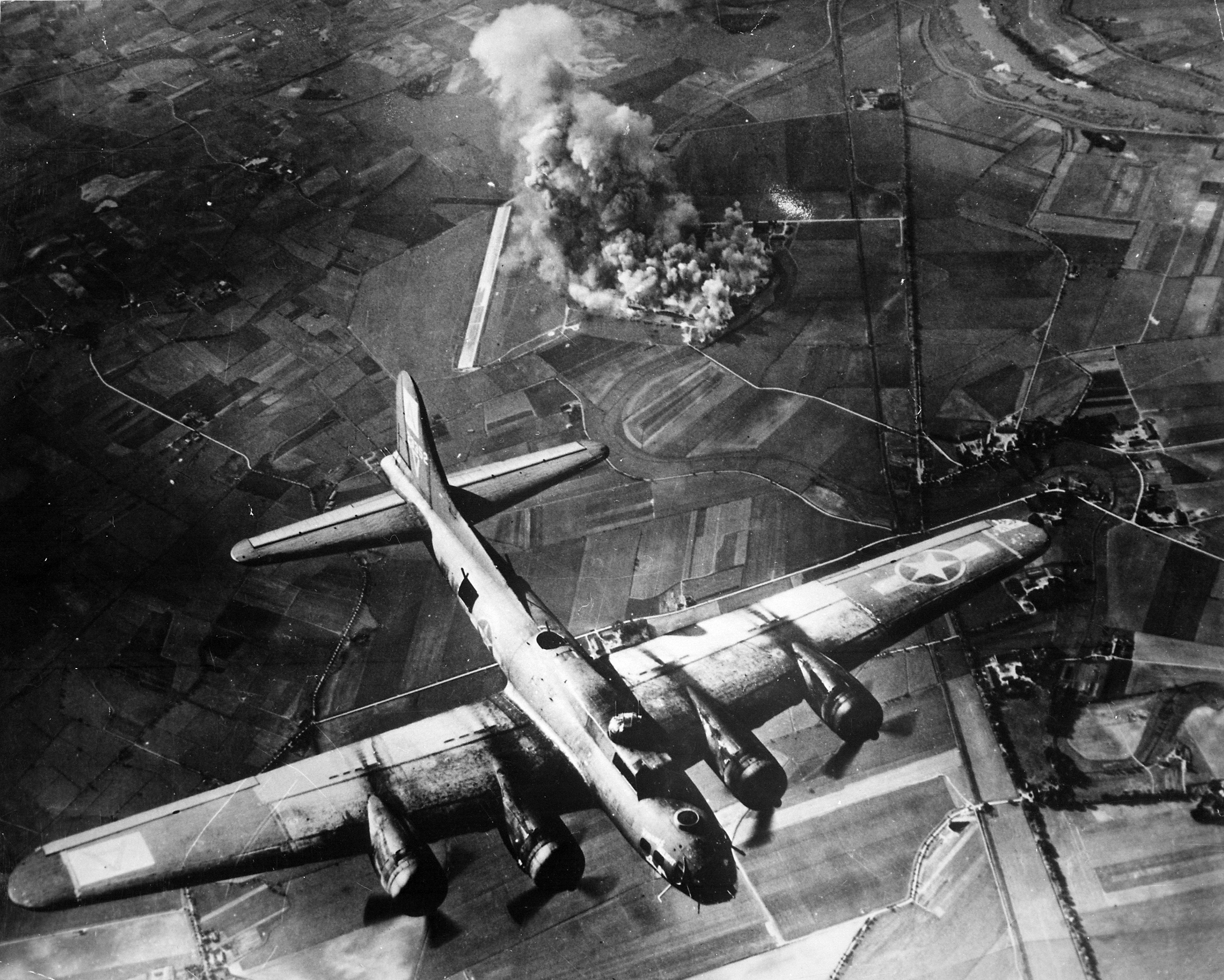
B-17s destroyed all but one of the buildings at the Marienburg Focke-Wulf factory on October 9, 1943.

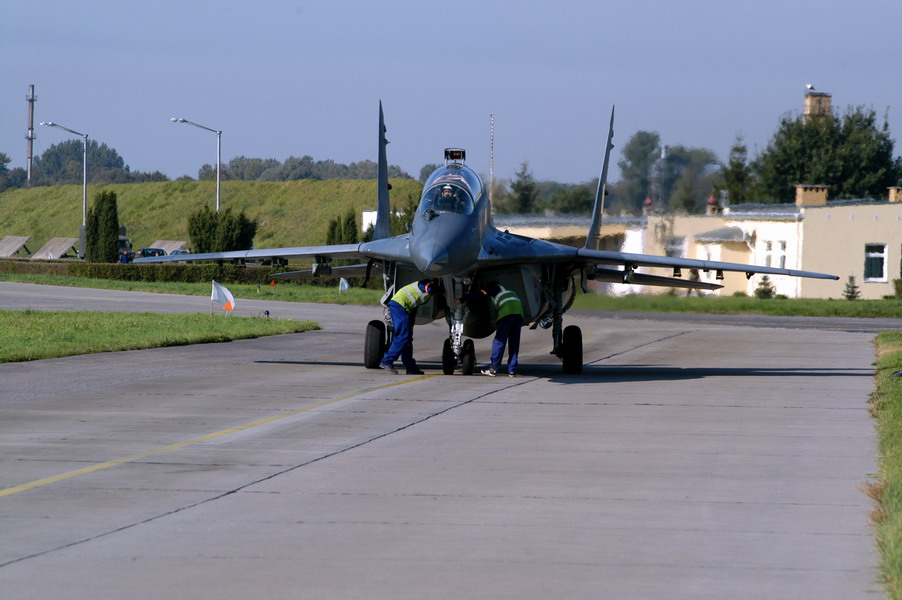
Polish Air Force MiG-29 in the 22nd Air Base

Part of the German Reich from 1871 to 1945, a civilian airfield was established in 1929 at Königsdorf near Marienburg - as it was known then. It was acquired by the Luftwaffe in 1934. Near the airfield was a 100-acre (0.40 km^{2}) Focke-Wulf aircraft production plant that had been moved from Bremen and which produced approximately half of all Focke-Wulf Fw 190s, and the Stalag XX-B prisoner-of-war camp was nearby. A United States Army Air Forces (USAAF) Eighth Air Force air raid on the "industrial area in Marienburg" on October 9, 1943, by 96 Boeing B-17 Flying Fortresses was called the Marienburg raid by Life magazine. The plant was attacked a second time by 98 B-17s on April 9, 1944.

Post-war, now part of Poland, Marienburg became Malbork and Soviet Air Forces units were based there for a few years. In 1952 41st Fighter Aviation Regiment of the Air Force of the Polish Army was formed to be based there, initially equipped with Mikoyan-Gurevich MiG-15 fighters, later replaced with Mikoyan-Gurevich MiG-17s, and from 1964 Mikoyan-Gurevich MiG-21s. In 2001 the regiment was dissolved and its ground and air components separated, to form the 22 Air Base and 41st Air Tactical Squadron respectively. In 2003 the last MiG-21s were retired, and in 2004 the squadron was rearmed with refurbished former East German Air Force MiG-29s obtained from the Luftwaffe.

The base was used by French Air Force aircraft deployed in May 2014 as part of NATO's response to the 2014 Russian military intervention in Ukraine. Initially, Dassault Rafale aircraft were deployed, though on 2 June 2014, four Dassault Mirage 2000 fighters from EC 1/2 and EC 2/5 relieved the Rafales. General Dynamics F-16 Fighting Falcon fighters from the Royal Netherlands Air Force and then from the Belgian Air Component stationed in Malbork until August 2015 when Baltic Air Policing activities were reduced from three to two bases.

On 6 July 2018, a MiG-29 crashed near Pasłęk, with its pilot dying in an ejection attempt. Technical issues are suspected to have played a role in the crash.

On 1 August 2022, the Italian Air Force stationed on site four Eurofighter Typhoon fighters for their first Baltic Air Policing mission in Poland.

On 3-14 February 2023, Dutch F-35 fighters stationed at the 22nd Air Base were scrambled to identify and intercept three Russian aircraft operating near Polish airspace. The Dutch F-35s escorted the formation from a distance and handed over the escort to NATO partners.

During March and August 2025, Operation Chessman took place as part of NATO's Air Policing by Royal Air Force Eurofighter Typhoon FGR4s as part of No. 140 Expeditionary Air Wing.

As of 2025, it was planned to decommission the remaining MiG-29s as they reach their certified flight hours
