= Gmina Lichnowy =

Gmina Lichnowy Lichnowy Commune
- Gmina
- Flag Coat of arms
- Interactive map of Gmina Lichnowy
- Coordinates (Lichnowy): 54°6′53″N 18°54′47″E
- Country: Poland
- Voivodeship: Pomeranian
- County: Malbork
- Seat: Lichnowy

Area
  - Total: 88.7 km^{2} (34.2 sq mi)

Population (2022)
  - Total: 4,427
  - Density: 49.9/km^{2} (129/sq mi)
- Website: http://www.lichnowy.pl/

Gmina Lichnowy is a rural gmina (administrative district) in Malbork County, Pomeranian Voivodeship, in northern Poland. Its seat is the village of Lichnowy, which lies approximately 12 kilometres (7 mi) north-west of Malbork and 34 km (21 mi) south-east of the regional capital Gdańsk.

The gmina covers an area of 88.7 square kilometres (34.2 sq mi), and as of 2022 its population was 4,427.

== Villages ==
Gmina Lichnowy contains the villages and settlements of Boręty, Boręty Drugie, Boręty Pierwsze, Dąbrowa, Lichnówki, Lichnówki Pierwsze, Lichnowy, Lisewo Malborskie, Parszewo, Pordenowo, Starynia, Stożki, Szymankowo and Tropiszewo.

== Neighbouring gminas ==
Gmina Lichnowy is bordered by the town of Tczew and by the gminas of Malbork, Miłoradz, Nowy Staw, Ostaszewo, Suchy Dąb and Tczew.
