= 41st Tactical Squadron =

41st Tactical Air Squadron
- 41 Eskadra Lotnictwa Taktycznego
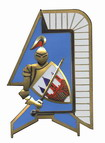
- Insignia of the 41st Tactical Squadron.
- Active: 1 January 2001 - 31 December 2011
- Country: Poland
- Branch: Polish Air Force
- Type: Tactical Squadron
- Role: Providing Air Superiority
- Part of: 2nd Air Defence Corps; 1st Tactical Air Brigade; 1st Tactical Air Wing
- Garrison/HQ: 22nd Tactical Air Base
- Anniversaries: 22 April
- Equipment: MiG-21 (until December 2003)
- Engagements: Baltic Air Policing

Aircraft flown
- Fighter: MiG-29B, MiG-29UB

The 41st Tactical Air Squadron (Polish: 41 Eskadra Lotnictwa Taktycznego) was a fighter squadron of the Polish Air Force. It was established in 2001 in Malbork, Poland and was stationed at the 22nd Tactical Air Base. The squadron operated Mikoyan MiG-29 jet fighters acquired from the German Air Force. Previously, these aircraft served with Jagdgeschwader 73 and were stationed at Rostock-Laage Airport. From 1952 to 2001 the unit was known as the 41st Tactical Air Regiment.

As of 2025, it was planned to decommission the squadron's MiG-29s as they reach their certified flight hours.

== Fighters ==
- Retired:
  - MiG-15 Jet Fighters (1954 - 1958)
  - MiG-17 Jet Fighters (1958 - 1981)
  - MiG-19 Jet Fighters (1959 - 1963)
  - MiG-21 Jet Fighters (1963 - 2003)
- Current:
  - MiG-29B
  - MiG-29UB
