= Królewo Malborskie =

- Village
- Location within Poland
- Coordinates: 54°1′47″N 19°7′14″E
- Country: Poland
- Voivodeship: Pomeranian
- County: Malbork
- Gmina: Stare Pole
- Population: 210
- Time zone: UTC+1 (CET)
  - Summer (DST): UTC+2 (CEST)
- Vehicle registration: GMB

Królewo Malborskie [kruˈlɛvɔ malˈbɔrskʲɛ] is a village in the administrative district of Gmina Stare Pole, within Malbork County, Pomeranian Voivodeship, in northern Poland.

22nd Air Base of the Polish Air Force is located nearby.
