= Jakob Sigismund Beck =

German philosopher (1761–1840)

- Born: 6 August 1761; Liessau (Lisewo), Marienburg/Malbork, Greater Poland Province, Crown of the Kingdom of Poland, Polish–Lithuanian Commonwealth
- Died: 29 August 1840 (aged 79); Rostock, Mecklenburg-Schwerin, German Confederation

Education
- Education: University of Königsberg
- Thesis: Dissertatio de theoremate Tayloriano, sive de lege generali, secundum quam functionis mutantur, notatis a quibus pendent variabilibus (1791)
- Academic advisors: Immanuel Kant, Christian Jakob Kraus, Johann Schultz

Philosophical work
- Era: 18th-century philosophy
- Region: Western philosophy
- School: Post-Kantian transcendental idealism
- Institutions: University of Halle; University of Rostock
- Main interests: Epistemology
- Notable ideas: Doctrine of the standpoint (Standpunctslehre)

Jakob Sigismund Beck (also Jacob; 6 August 1761 – 29 August 1840) was a German philosopher.

== Biography ==
Beck was born in the village of Liessau (Lisewo) in the rural district of Marienburg/Malbork in Greater Poland in 1761. The son of a Liessau pastor, he studied (after 1783) mathematics and philosophy at the University of Königsberg, where Christian Jakob Kraus, Johann Schultz, and Immanuel Kant were his teachers. After his studies, he first accepted a post as a teacher at a grammar school in Halle. With his thesis Dissertatio de theoremate Tayloriano, sive de lege generali, secundum quam functionis mutantur, notatis a quibus pendent variabilibus, which he wrote in Halle, he was qualified as a university lecturer. He then worked as a lecturer of philosophy at the University of Halle (1791–1799) and then he became a professor of philosophy at the University of Rostock (from 1799). He devoted himself to criticism and explanation of the doctrine of Kant, and in 1793 published the Erläuternder Auszug aus den kritischen Schriften des Herrn Prof. Kant, auf Anrathen desselben (Riga, 1793–1796), which has been widely used as a compendium of Kantian doctrine.

Beck endeavoured to explain away certain of the contradictions which are found in Kant's system by saying that much of the language is used in a popular sense for the sake of intelligibility, e.g. where Kant attributes to things-in-themselves an existence under the conditions of time, space and causality, and yet holds that they furnish the material of our apprehensions. Beck maintains that the real meaning of Kant's theory is idealism; that knowledge of objects outside the domain of consciousness is impossible, and hence that nothing positive remains when we have removed the subjective element. Matter is deduced by the original synthesis. Similarly, the idea of God is a symbolic representation of the voice of conscience guiding from within. The value of Beck's exegesis has been to a great extent overlooked owing to the greater attention given to the work of J. G. Fichte. Besides the three volumes of the Erläuternder Auszug, he published the Grundriss der kritischen Philosophie (1796), containing an interpretation of the Kantian Kritik in the manner of Salomon Maimon.

Beck died in Rostock.

== Works ==
- Erläuternder Auszug aus den Kritischen Schriften des Herrn Prof. Kant (1793–96), vol. 3: Einzig-möglicher Standpunct, aus welchem die critische Philosophie beurtheilt werden muß (1796)
