= Krasnołęka, Pomeranian Voivodeship =

Krasnołęka
- Village
- Location within Poland
- Coordinates: 54°2′44″N 19°9′40″E
- Country: Poland
- Voivodeship: Pomeranian
- County: Malbork
- Gmina: Stare Pole
- Population: 153

Krasnołęka [krasnɔˈwɛnka] is a village in the administrative district of Gmina Stare Pole, within Malbork County, Pomeranian Voivodeship, in northern Poland.
