= Otto Stellter =

Otto Stellter (22 July 1823 - 21 August 1894) was a German jurist who went into politics, sitting as a member of the national Reichstag (parliament) (FKP) between 1878 and 1881.

== Life ==
Otto Theodor Friedrich Stellter was born at Königsberg in East Prussia. Between 1840 and 1843 he studied jurisprudence at the city's university and at the Frederick-William University (as the "Humboldt" was then known) in Berlin. At Königsberg he was a member of the Pappenhemia student fraternity. He qualified as a lawyer in 1849. In January 1849 he embarked on a career in Königsberg as a lawyer and notary.

In July 1878 he entered the German Reichstag (parliament), representing the third Königsberg electoral district which covered the central part of the city, and sitting as a member of the conservative National Party ("Deutsche Reichspartei"). As a parliamentarian he sat on several parliamentary commissions. However, at the next general election, which took place in October 1881, he lost his Königsberg seat to Julius Otto Ludwig Möller of the Progressive Party.

Otto Stellter died on 21 August 1894 at Neuhäuser, a small town on the coastal strip of land separating the "Frisches Haff" (as the Vistula Lagoon was then known) from the sea.
