= Ostaszewo, Pomeranian Voivodeship =

Ostaszewo
- Village
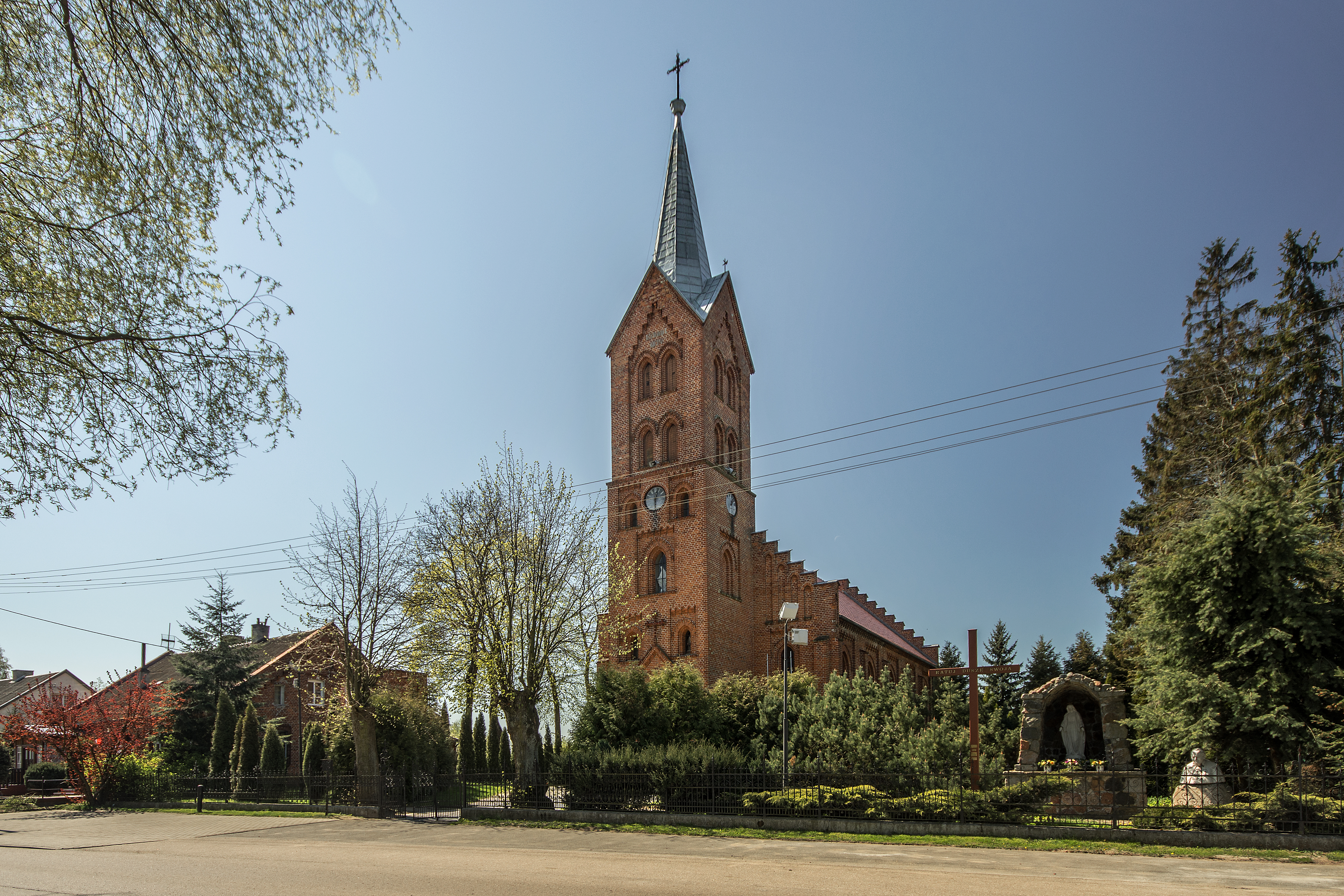
- Saint John's Church

- Location within Poland
- Coordinates: 54°13′6″N 18°56′50″E
- Country: Poland
- Voivodeship: Pomeranian
- County: Nowy Dwór
- Gmina: Ostaszewo
- Population: 1,017

Ostaszewo [ɔstaˈʂɛvɔ] is a village in Nowy Dwór County, Pomeranian Voivodeship, in northern Poland. It is the seat of the gmina (administrative district) called Gmina Ostaszewo.

Before 1772 the area was part of Kingdom of Poland, 1772-1919 Prussia and Germany, 1920-1939 Free City of Danzig, 1939 - February 1945 Nazi Germany. For the history of the region, see History of Pomerania.
