= Lichnowy, Malbork County =

Lichnowy
- Village
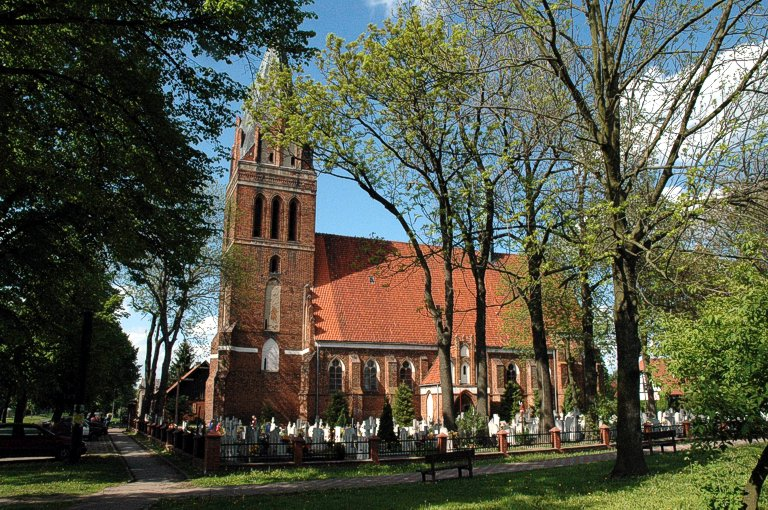
- Church of Saint Ursula in Lichnowy

- Location within Poland
- Coordinates: 54°6′53″N 18°54′47″E
- Country: Poland
- Voivodeship: Pomeranian
- County: Malbork
- Gmina: Lichnowy
- Population: 762
- Website: http://www.lichnowy.pl/

Lichnowy [lixˈnɔvɨ] is a village in Malbork County, Pomeranian Voivodeship, in northern Poland. It is the seat of the gmina (administrative district) called Gmina Lichnowy.
