= Niedźwiedź, Greater Poland Voivodeship =

Niedźwiedź
- Village
- Location within Poland
- Coordinates: 51°29′2″N 17°52′42″E
- Country: Poland
- Voivodeship: Greater Poland
- County: Ostrzeszów
- Gmina: Ostrzeszów
- Population (approx.): 500

Niedźwiedź [ˈɲɛd͡ʑvjɛt͡ɕ] is a village in the administrative district of Gmina Ostrzeszów, within Ostrzeszów County, Greater Poland Voivodeship, in west-central Poland.

The village has an approximate population of 500.
