= Malbork County =

Malbork County Powiat malborski
- County
- Flag Coat of arms

- Division into gminas
- Coordinates (Malbork): 54°2′N 19°2′E
- Country: Poland
- Voivodeship: Pomeranian
- Seat: Malbork
- Gminas: Total 6 (incl. 1 urban): Malbork; Gmina Lichnowy; Gmina Malbork; Gmina Miłoradz; Gmina Nowy Staw; Gmina Stare Pole

Area
  - Total: 494.63 km^{2} (190.98 sq mi)

Population (2019)
  - Total: 63,575
  - Density: 128.53/km^{2} (332.89/sq mi)
  - Urban: 42,713
  - Rural: 20,862
- Car plates: GMB
- Website: www.powiat.malbork.pl

Malbork County (Polish: powiat malborski) is a unit of territorial administration and local government (powiat) in Pomeranian Voivodeship, northern Poland. It came into being on January 1, 1999, as a result of the Polish local government reforms passed in 1998. Its administrative seat and largest town is Malbork (site of the historic Malbork Castle), 46 kilometres (29 mi) south-east of the regional capital Gdańsk. The only other town in the county is Nowy Staw, lying 12 km (7 mi) north of Malbork. Until 2002, the county also included the areas which now make up Sztum County.

The county covers an area of 494.63 square kilometres (191.0 sq mi). As of 2019, its total population is 63,575, out of which the population of Malbork is 38,464, of the urban-rural gmina of Nowy Staw is 4,248, and of the rural gminas is 20,862.

Malbork County on a map of the counties of Pomeranian Voivodeship

Malbork County is bordered by Nowy Dwór County to the north, Elbląg County to the east, Sztum County to the south, Tczew County to the west and Gdańsk County to the north-west.

== Administrative divisions ==
The county is subdivided into six gminas (one urban, one urban-rural and four rural):

Gmina	Type	Area (km^{2})	Population (2019)	Seat
Malbork	urban	17.2	38,465	
Gmina Nowy Staw	urban-rural	114.4	7,656	Nowy Staw
Gmina Malbork	rural	100.9	4,804	Malbork *
Gmina Stare Pole	rural	79.7	4,678	Stare Pole
Gmina Lichnowy	rural	88.7	4,615	Lichnowy
Gmina Miłoradz	rural	93.8	3,357	Miłoradz
* seat not part of the gmina
