= Jantar, Poland =

Jantar
- Village
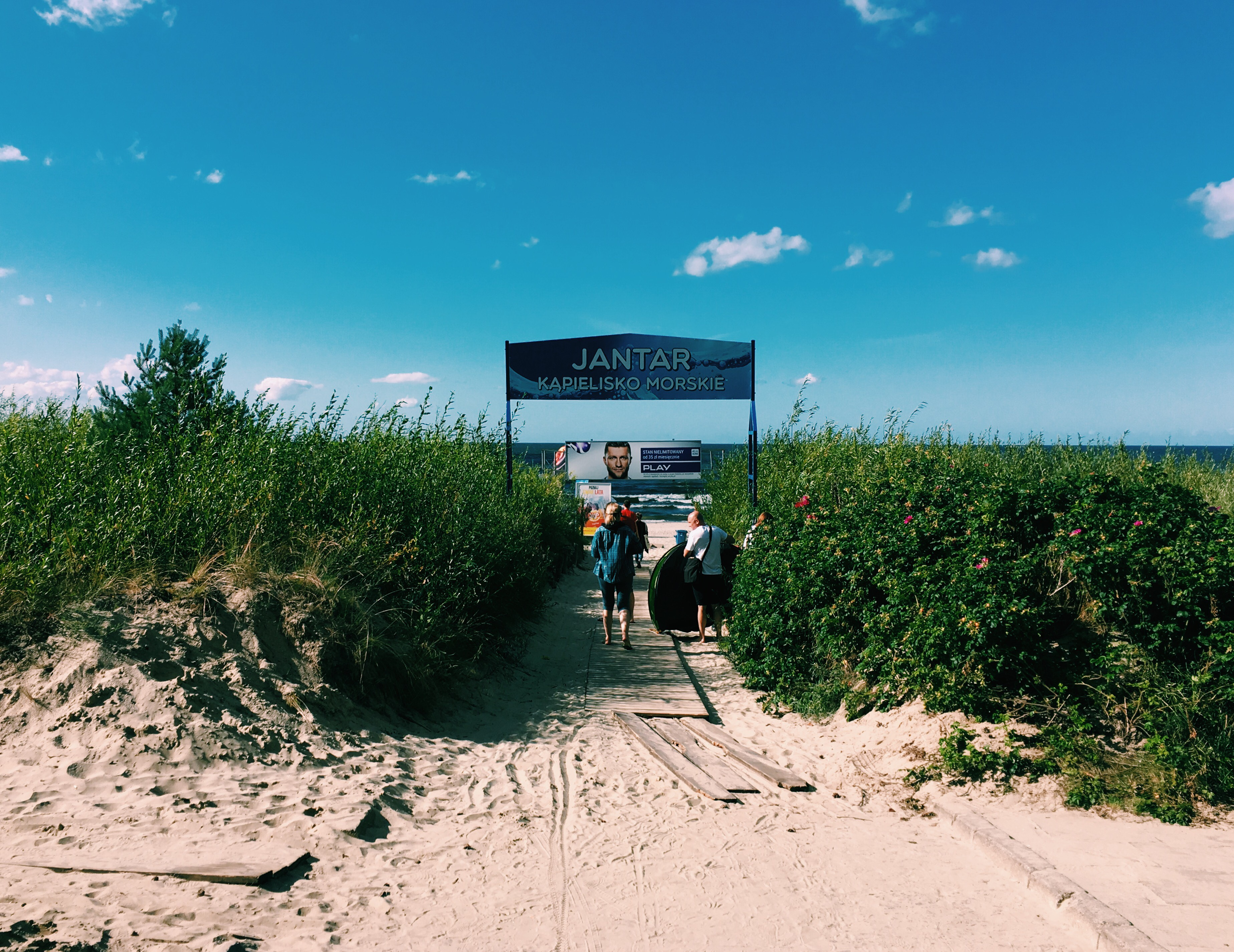
- Jantar beach entrance

- Location within Poland
- Coordinates: 54°20′9″N 19°1′59″E
- Country: Poland
- Voivodeship: Pomeranian
- County: Nowy Dwór
- Gmina: Stegna
- Population: 1,008
- Website: http://www.jantar.turystyka.pl/

Jantar ([ˈjantar]; German: Pasewark), formerly known in Polish between 1945 and 1947 as Paców, is a village in the Gmina Stegna district of the Nowy Dwór County, in the Pomeranian Voivodeship of northern Poland.

The word "Jantar" comes from the Lithuanian word for amber.

== Gallery ==
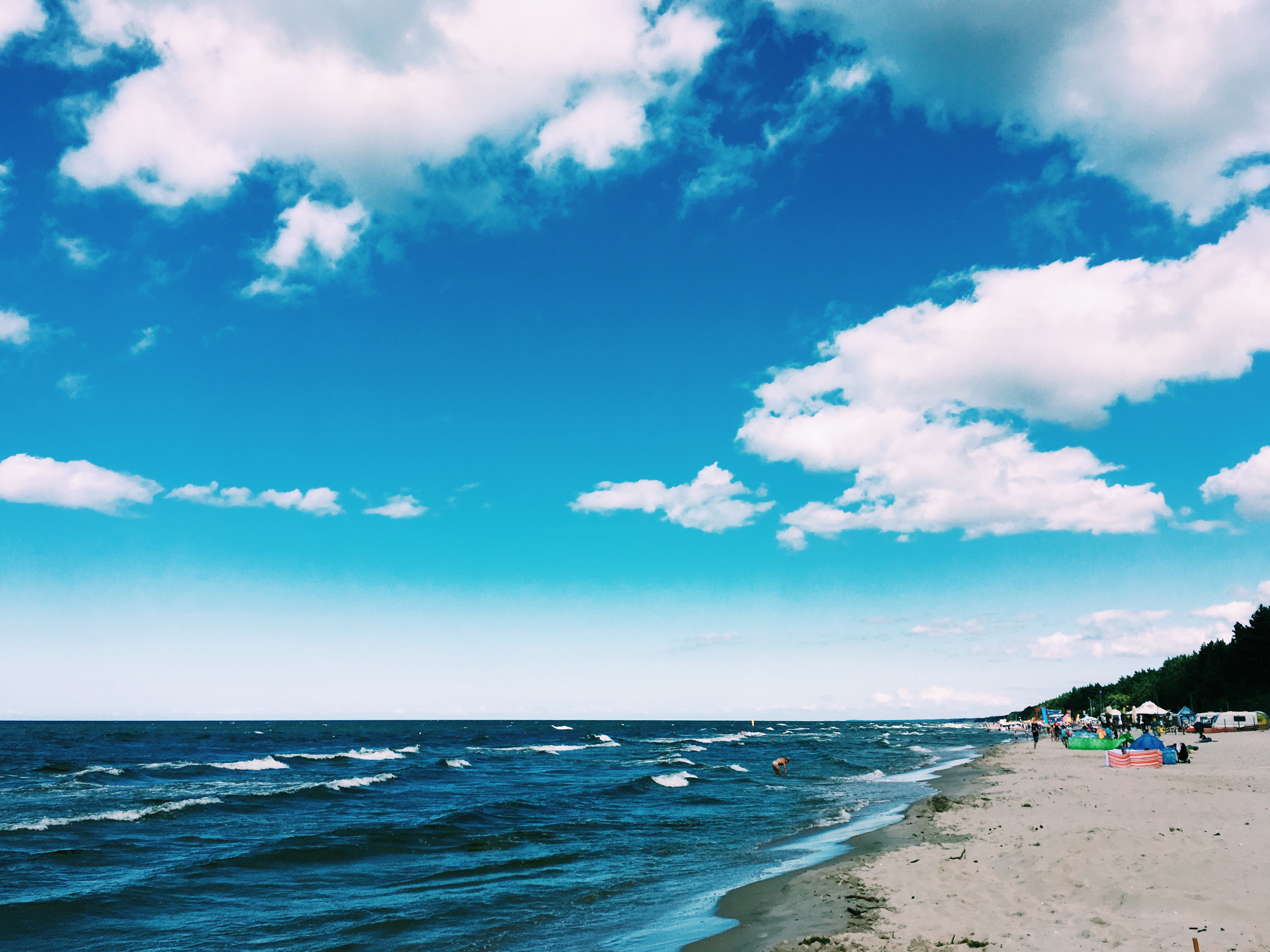
Beach to the west of Jantar (summer).

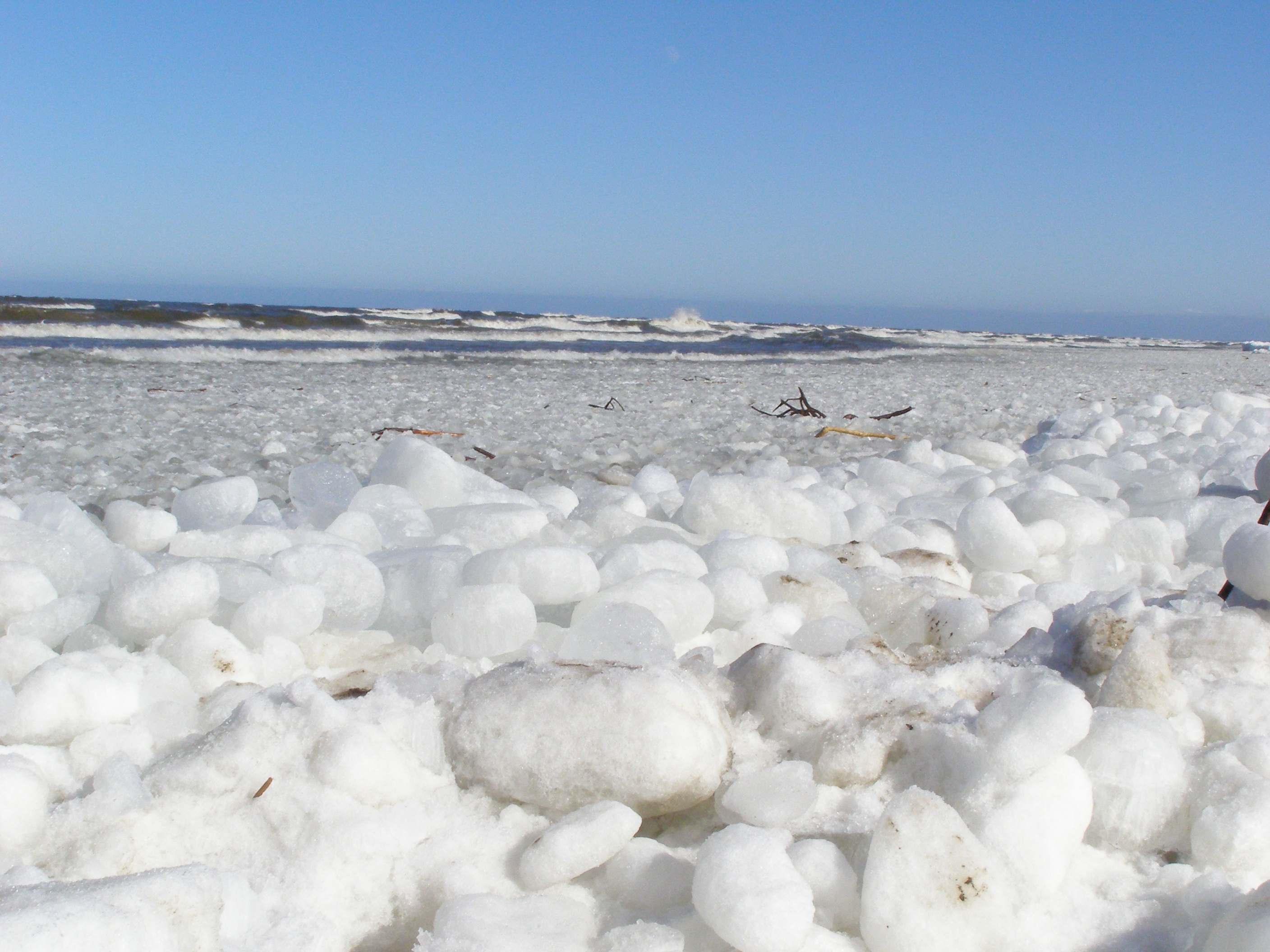
Sea ice on the beach in Jantar (winter).

Signpost

== See also ==
- Junoszyno
- Mikoszewo
