= Gdańsk Head =

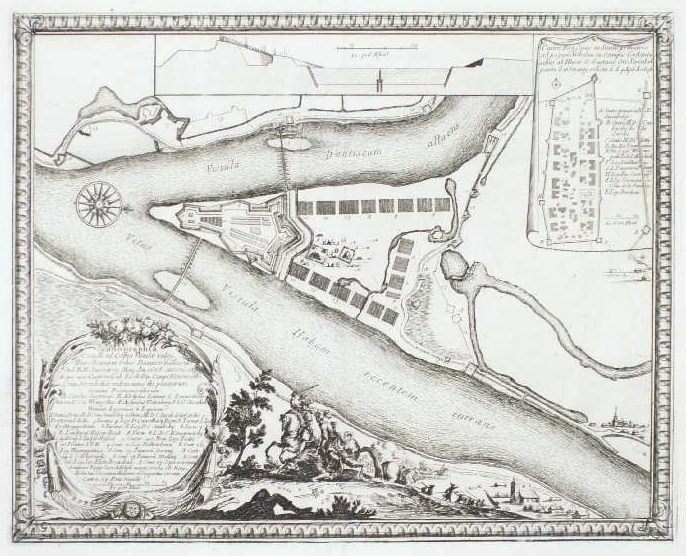
- A 1696 map of the Gdańsk Head fortifications
- Interactive map of the Gdańsk Head area

General information
- Coordinates: 54.26697°N 18.95195°E
- Completed: 1626 (fortifications); 1895 (lock)
- Demolished: Late 17th century (fortifications)
- Owner: Regional Water Economy Administration in Gdańsk

The Gdańsk Head (Polish: Gdańska Głowa; German: Danziger Haupf) is the location of the confluence of the Vistula and Szkarpawa rivers, in the village of Drewnica, Pomeranian Voivodeship. It was the site of fortifications that existed only in the 17th century; a lock built in 1895 exists here to this day.

== Geography and location ==
The Gdańsk Head, located at the confluence of the Vistula and Szkarpawa, is located in the Vistula Fens, within the boundaries of the village of Drewnica. The lock beside the Gdańsk Head is located on a route of inland waters leading from Gdańsk to the Vistula Lagoon.

== Characteristics ==
=== Characteristics of the fortifications ===
The fort at the Gdańsk Head was subjected to repeated expansions thoroughout its existence. When they were first built in 1627, they consisted of only a sconce with four bastions; after multiple further expansions, by 1655, it had evolved into a large bastion fort more than 200 metres (660 ft) in width. At that time, it was staffed by between 600 and 800 men and defended by about 50 large guns of varying calibre.

=== Characteristics of the lock ===
The lock enables movement between the Vistula and Szkarpawa rivers whilst holding back any flood waters that may come from the Vistula. It is a pound lock built largely of concrete, with the sides being reinforced by a brick construction. Both gates are built of steel. A larger gate is found further out on the side of the Vistula, which may be closed for the servicing of larger ships. The lock has been electrified, but there is a preserved and functioning manual system. The offices of the lock are located in a distinctive red-brick building located right next to the lock.

== History ==
This location was granted to the city of Gdańsk by Casimir Jagiellon in 1454, shortly after the Thirteen Years' War. Fortifications were constructed here during the Polish–Swedish War (1600–1629), when the city of Gdańsk was threatened by the military and naval forces of the Swedish Empire; they were likely built around 1626. On 14 September 1626, the Gdańsk Head was seized by Swedish forces and significantly expanded; it would control river traffic on the Vistula up until 1635.

Following the Treaty of Stuhmsdorf in 1635, the land was returned to the city of Gdańsk. The fortifications on the Gdańsk Head were subsequently taken down, but at the start of the Little Northern War in 1655, they were rebuilt, and again seized by Swedish forces in February 1656. The fortifications of the Gdańsk Head were then heavily expanded; the location of the fort ultimately made it a strategic location that allowed the Swedes to easily control the Vistula Fens and launch attacks against the city of Gdańsk. After having survived multiple attempts at the fort's seizure, the Swedish forces located in the fort surrendered on 11 December 1659. The defenders of the fort were then taken prisoner and, in 1660, sent back to Sweden on two ships, but one grounded on a shoal and the other departed a month and a half late due to heavy winds.

Shortly after the war ended, in the late 17th century, the defences were taken apart due to fears that they might aid further future enemies. The area was briefly again fortified in 1812 by the army of the First French Empire before the fortifications were fully abandoned shortly after. More than 80 years later, during the 1890–1895 construction of the Przekop Wisły, the authorities of the German Empire additionally built up the floodproofing of the Vistula Fens. In 1895, as part of this project, a lock was constructed beside the Gdańsk Head.
