= Witold Gintowt-Dziewałtowski =

Polish politician (born 1949)

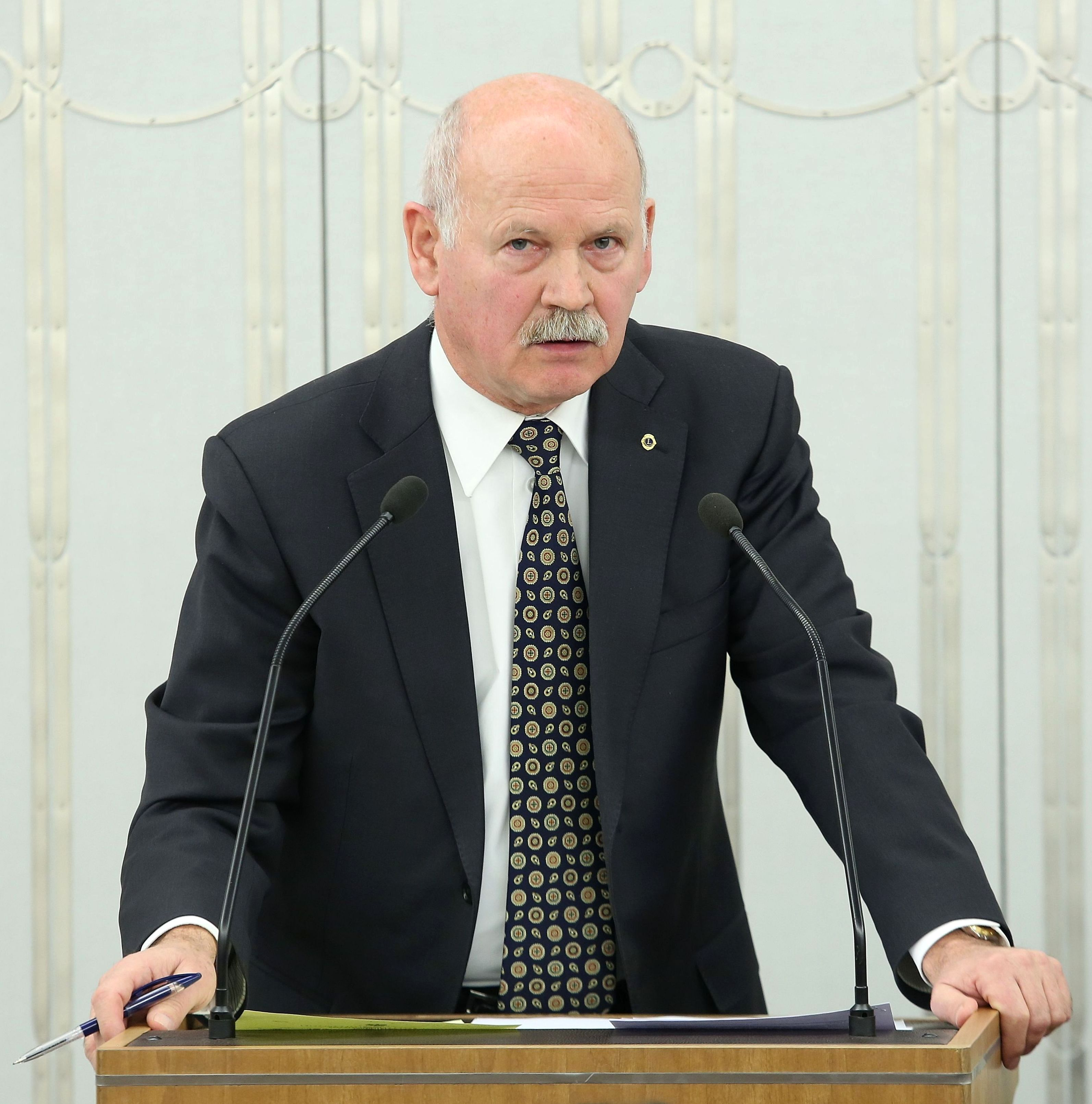

Member of the Sejm
- In office 20 October 1997 – 7 November 2011
- Constituency: 34 – Elbląg

Member of the Senate
- In office 8 November 2011 – 11 November 2015

Personal details
- Born: 11 January 1949 (age 77)
- Party: Independent (2015-)
- Other political affiliations: Democratic Left Alliance (1999-2011); Civic Platform (2011-2015)

Witold Józef Gintowt-Dziewałtowski (born 11 January 1949 in Drewnica) is a Polish politician. He was elected to the Sejm on 25 September 2005, getting 9389 votes in 34 Elbląg district as a candidate from Democratic Left Alliance list.

He was also a member of Sejm 1997-2001 and Sejm 2001-2005.

== See also ==
- Members of Polish Sejm 2005-2007
