= Świerznica =

Świerznica may refer to the following locations in Poland:

- Świerznica, Pomeranian Voivodeship, a village in Gmina Stegna, Nowy Dwór County
- Świerznica, West Pomeranian Voivodeship, a village in Gmina Rąbino, Świdwin County
- Świerznica (river), a river in West Pomeranian Voivodeship
