= Vistula Spit canal =

Canal in Poland

Coordinates: 54°21′20″N 19°18′40″E

Vistula Spit Canal Polish: Kanał przez Mierzeję Wiślaną
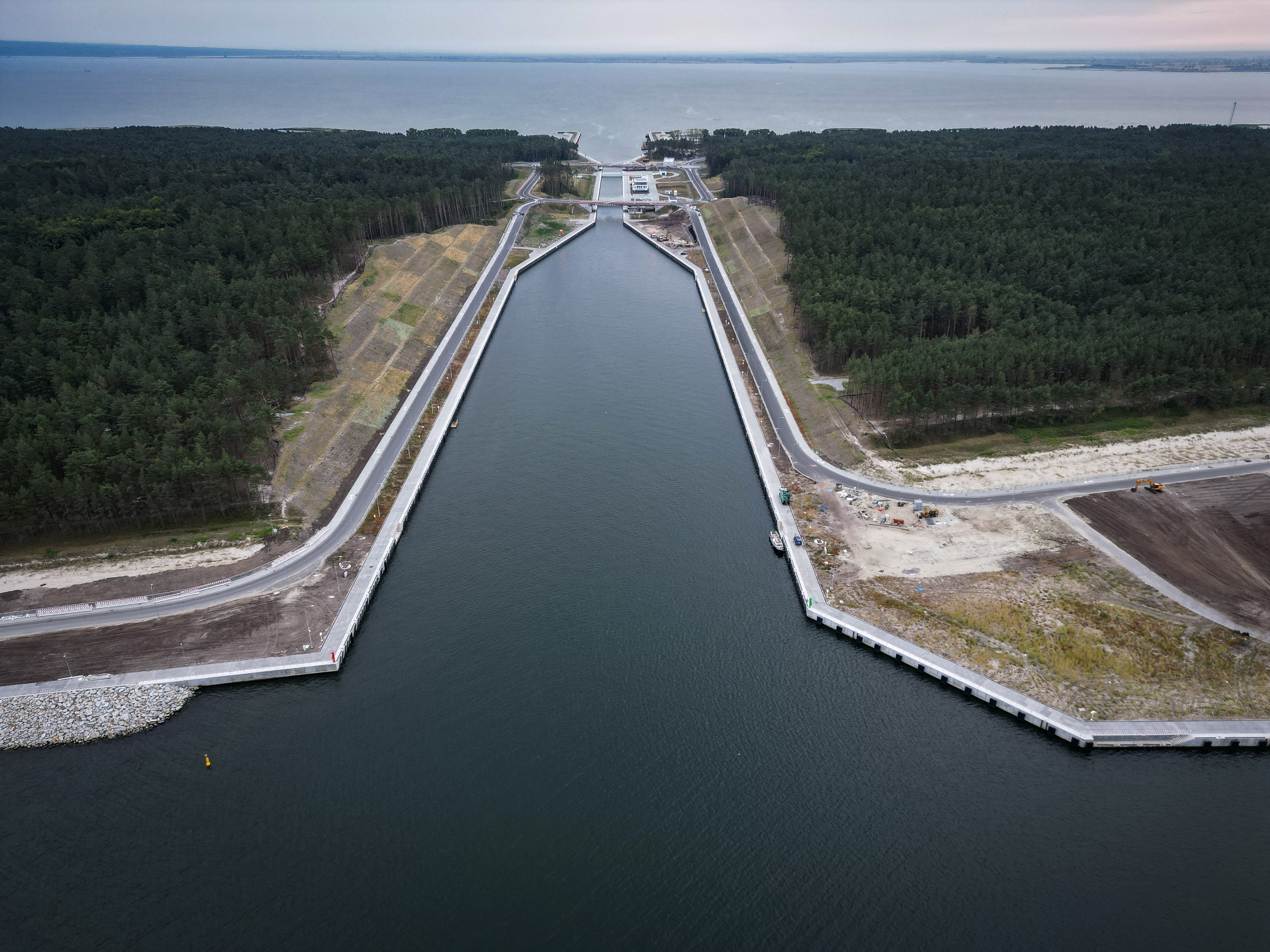
- Aerial view of the Vistula Spit canal
- Interactive map of Vistula Spit Canal; Polish: Kanał przez Mierzeję Wiślaną

Specifications
- Length: 1.536 km (0.954 miles)
- Locks: 1
- Status: Open

History
- Construction began: 4 October 2019
- Date completed: 17 September 2022

Geography
- Start point: Nowy Świat seaport, Bay of Gdańsk
- End point: Nowy Świat seaport, Vistula Lagoon

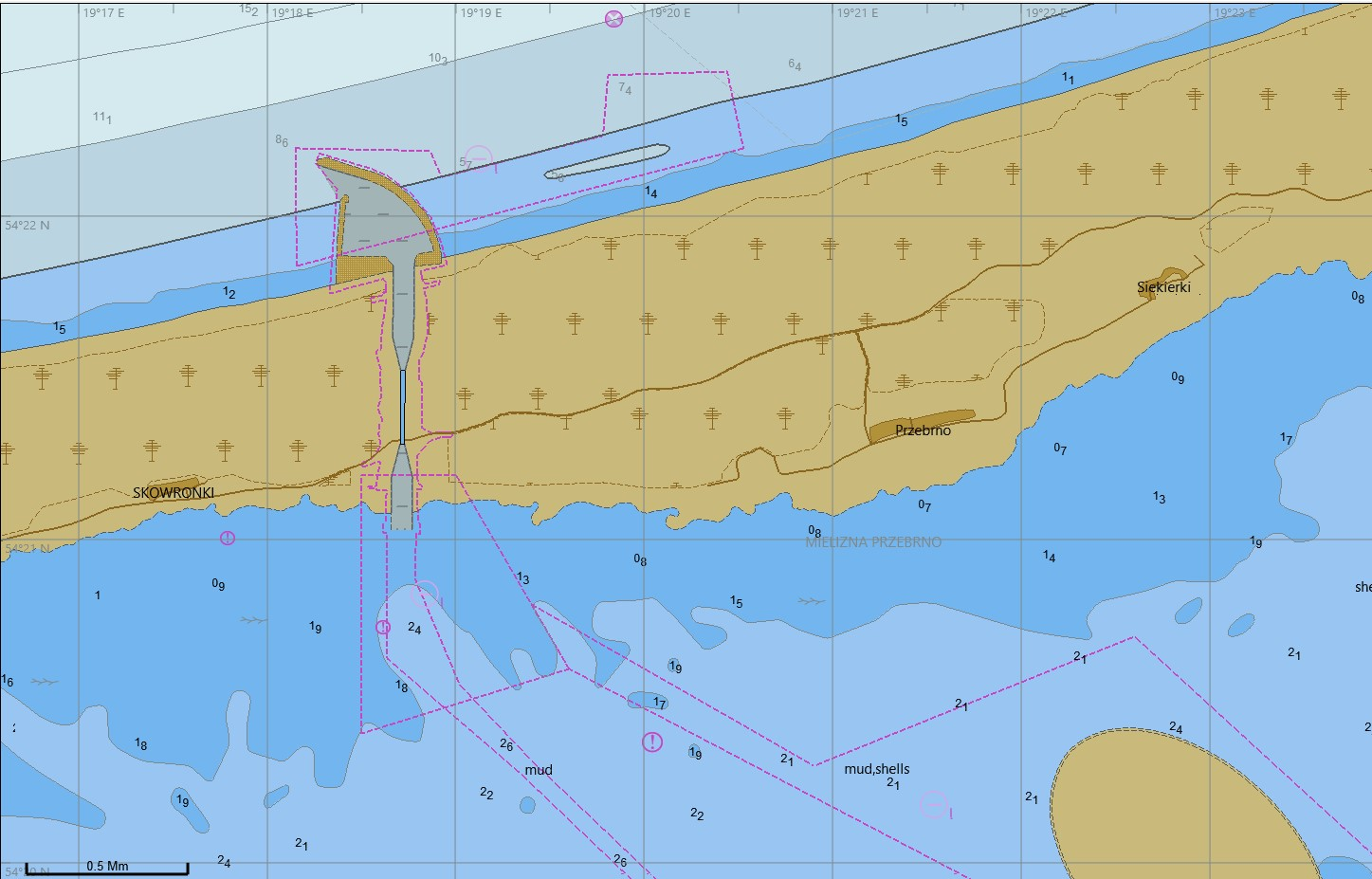
Map of the canal

The Vistula Spit canal (Polish: Kanał przez Mierzeję Wiślaną), officially known as the Nowy Świat ship canal (Polish: Kanał żeglugowy Nowy Świat), is a canal across the Polish section of the Vistula Spit that creates a second connection between the Vistula Lagoon and Gulf of Gdańsk. It allows ships to enter the Vistula Lagoon and the port of Elbląg without having to rely on the Russian Strait of Baltiysk, saving a 100 km (62 mi) journey and avoiding Russian waters. Its construction started in February 2019. It is 1,536 m (5,039 ft) in length and allows ships of draft up to 4 m (13 ft), length up to 100 m (330 ft), and beam up to 20 m (66 ft) to pass through.

The canal was officially inaugurated on 17 September 2022. Further works will continue. It is part of the project to construct a waterway connecting Bay of Gdańsk with the port of Elbląg with a total length of 22.88 km (14.22 mi).

The canal is located between the villages of Skowronki and Przebrno, at the site of an abandoned settlement called Nowy Świat, hence its official name.

== History ==
The idea of constructing the canal dates back to 1577 when the King of Poland, Stephen Báthory, proposed a plan to build it on the Vistula Spit in connection with the Danzig Rebellion (1575–1577). He sent Castellan of Wiślica Mikołaj Firlej and Royal Chancellor Piotr Kłoczowski to the region and the village of Skowronki was selected as the site for the planned canal. When a peace treaty with Gdańsk was signed, the project was eventually cancelled.

The proposal for building the canal was revived in 1945 by the pre-war Deputy Prime Minister of Poland Eugeniusz Kwiatkowski. In the 1970s and 1980s, the project of the canal was designed by engineer Henryk Pietrowicz.

The final decision to go ahead with the project was officially made on 10 November 2006 in Elbląg by Prime Minister Jarosław Kaczyński ahead of the upcoming 2006 Polish local elections.

== Works ==
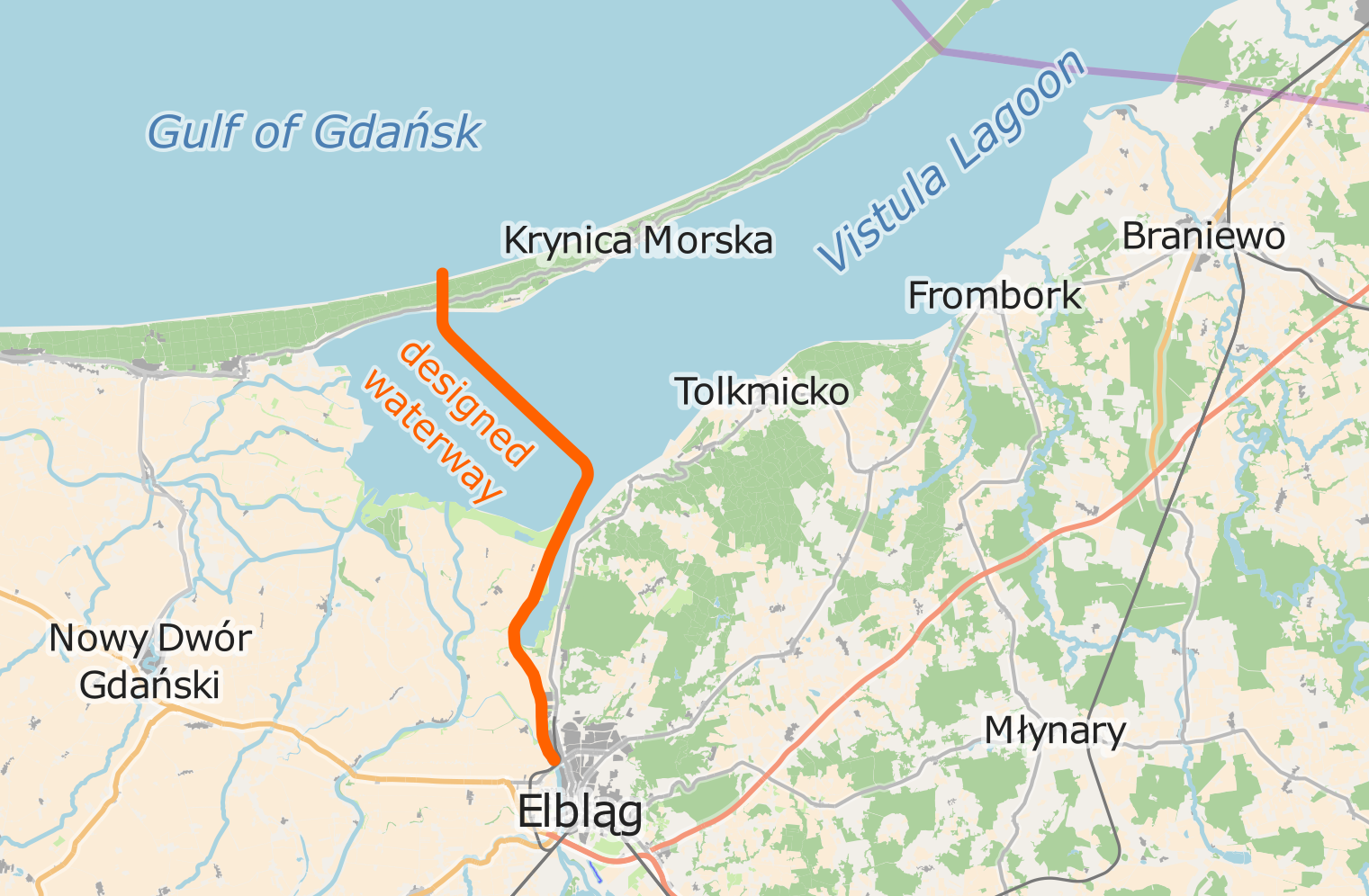
Proposed waterway Elbląg - Gdańsk Bay

The major works included: the construction of the breakwater forebay on the Gdańsk Bay side, using 10,000 concrete blocks, the construction of the shipping channel together with all its infrastructure, including locks; the construction of new roads and two swing bridges and the construction of an artificial island in the Vistula Lagoon.

The works started in February 2019 with tree cutting, which was finished during 15–20 February 2019. Logging and branch removal was to be finished by the end of March.

The beginning of the construction of the artificial island was announced on 30 May 2020. Its area is planned to be about 180 ha (440 acres) and it is expected to be a bird habitat. Its tentative name is the Aestian Island, selected by a poll and to be formally approved.

The first of two bridges over the canal, the southern one, was completed in June 2021. It is on the road connecting Krynica Morska and Stegna.

== Costs ==
A contract was signed with a Polish-Belgian consortium in October 2019 to build the canal at a cost of 992 million PLN (230 million euro). The total cost of the project is expected to be 2 billion PLN.

== Concerns ==
The Russian Federation strongly objected to the canal on both environmental and security grounds, claiming that since the canal could allow NATO warships to enter the Vistula Lagoon without passing near the Russian military facilities at Baltiysk, this presented a direct threat to the security of Kaliningrad and the Russian Federation as a whole.

Environmental concerns had been expressed by environmental activists in Europe and Poland, which did not stop the project.

Marine biologist Dr. Agata Błaszczyk expresses the concern associated with the phosphorus accumulated in the sediments at the bottom of the lagoon, primarily coming from technical wastewaters from industries in the area of Elbląg, from animal farming sewage, and from washed-out fertilizers, which contribute to eutrophication of the nearly closed lagoon resulting in strong blooms of cyanobacteria, which in turn contribute to algal blooms in the lagoon, giving it a distinct greenish color compared with the rest of the Baltic Sea.

The new waterway is expected to contribute to the mobility of the sediments, possibly resulting in changes in the ecology of the adjacent areas of the Baltic Sea with unknown consequences. The concern is that the cyanobacteria in the lagoon are different from those in the open sea, with higher toxicity.

== Gallery ==
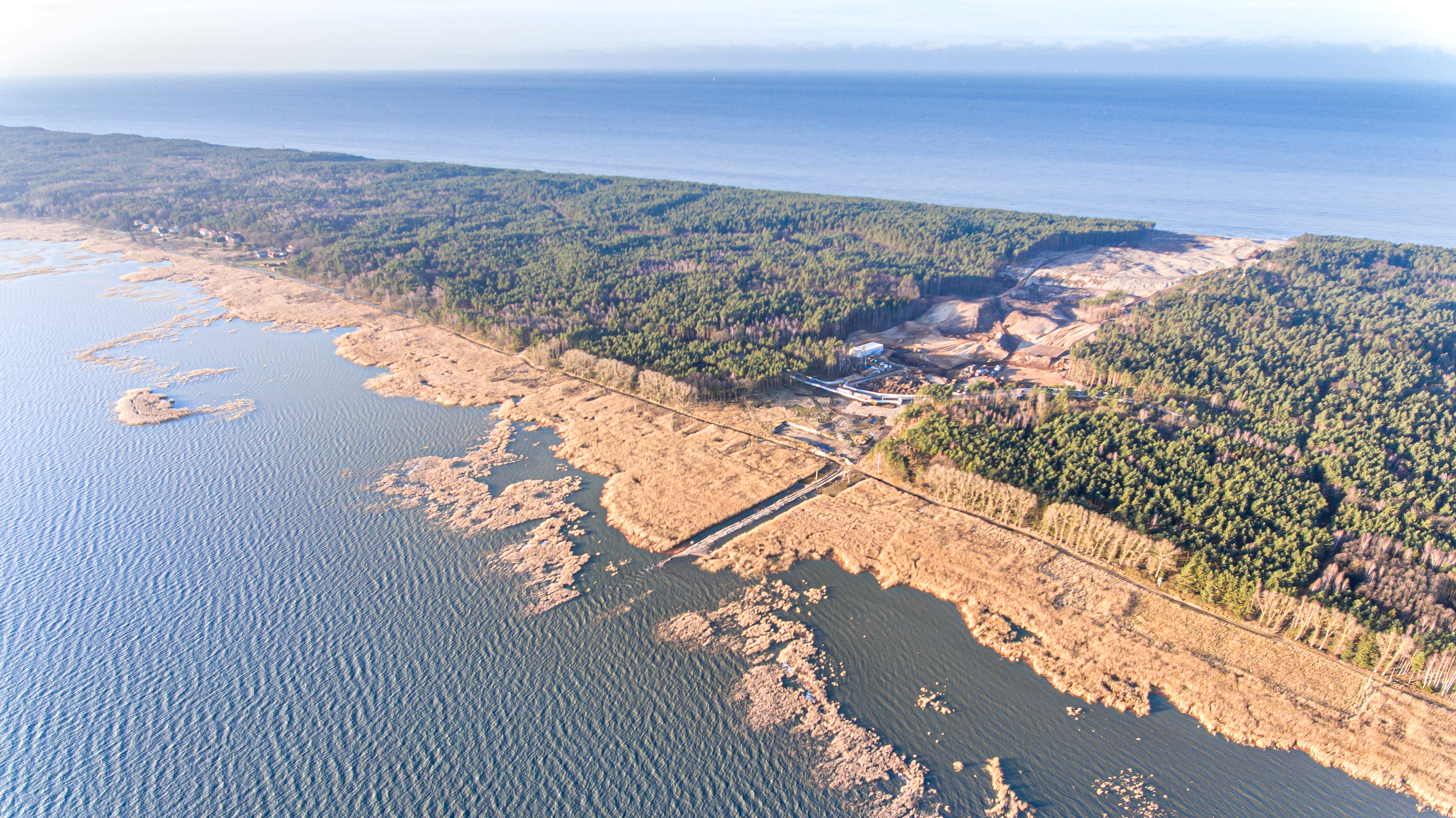
The canal under construction in January 2020

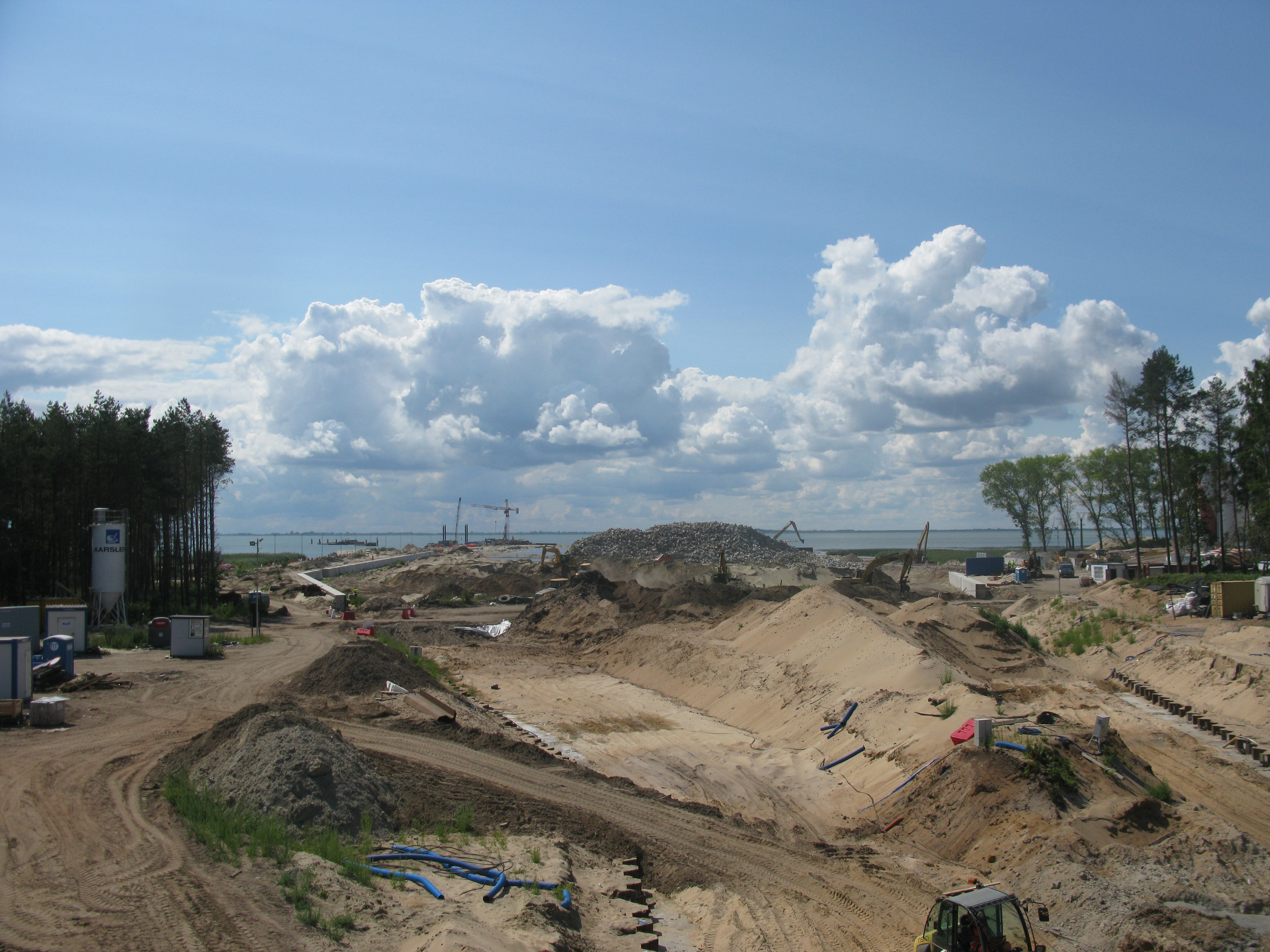
The canal under construction in July 2021

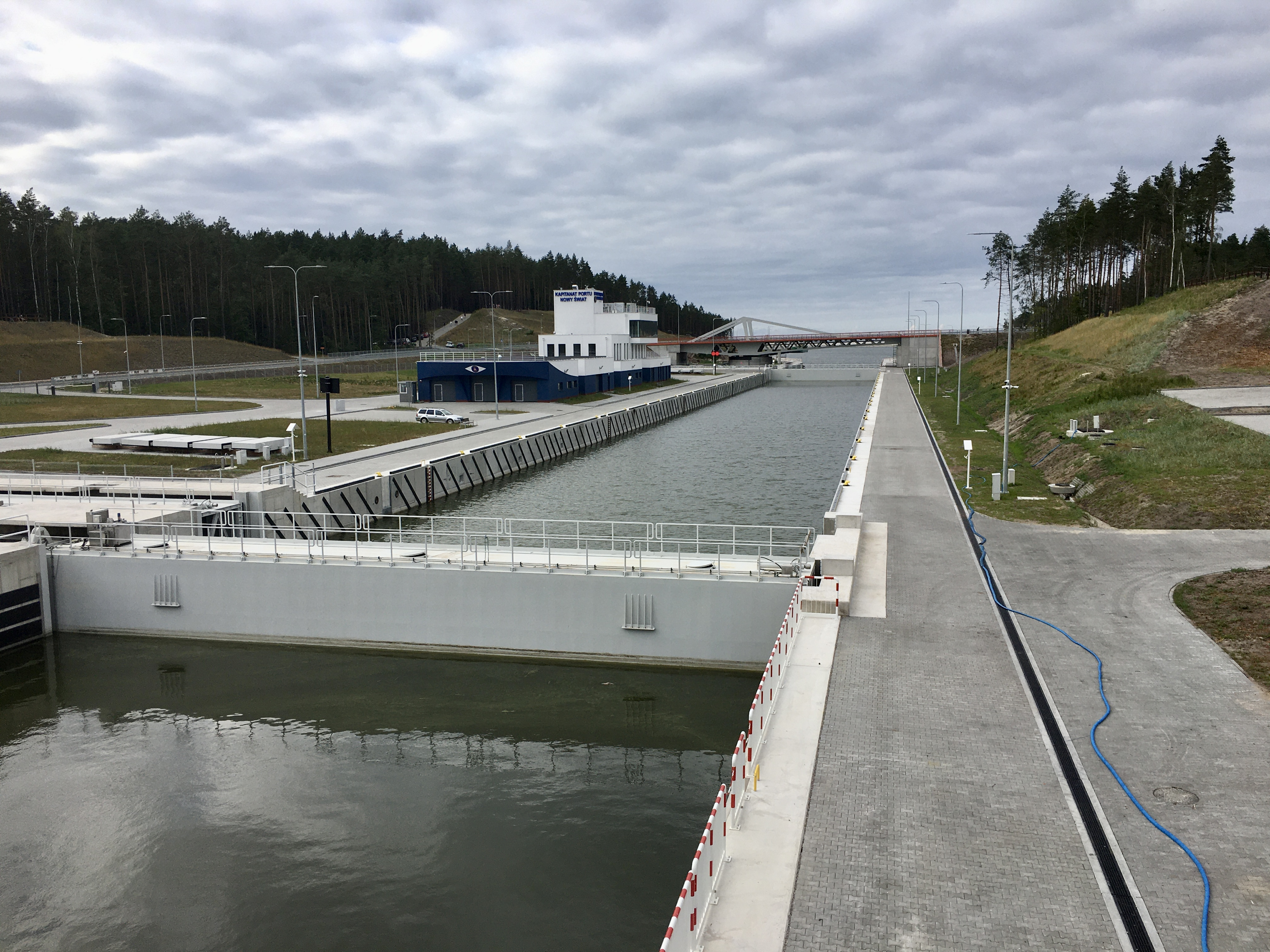
The lock of the Vistula Spit canal

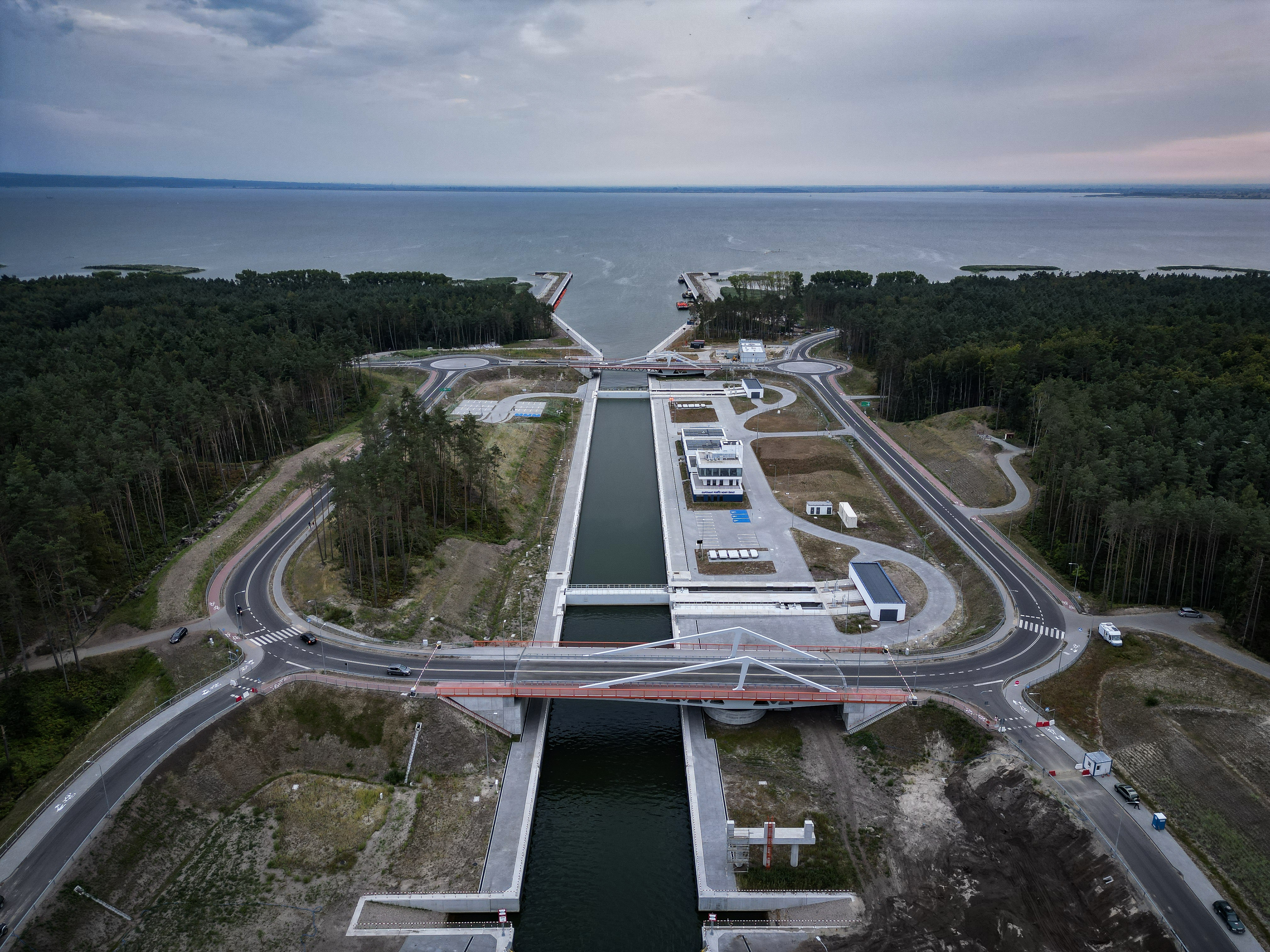
Aerial view

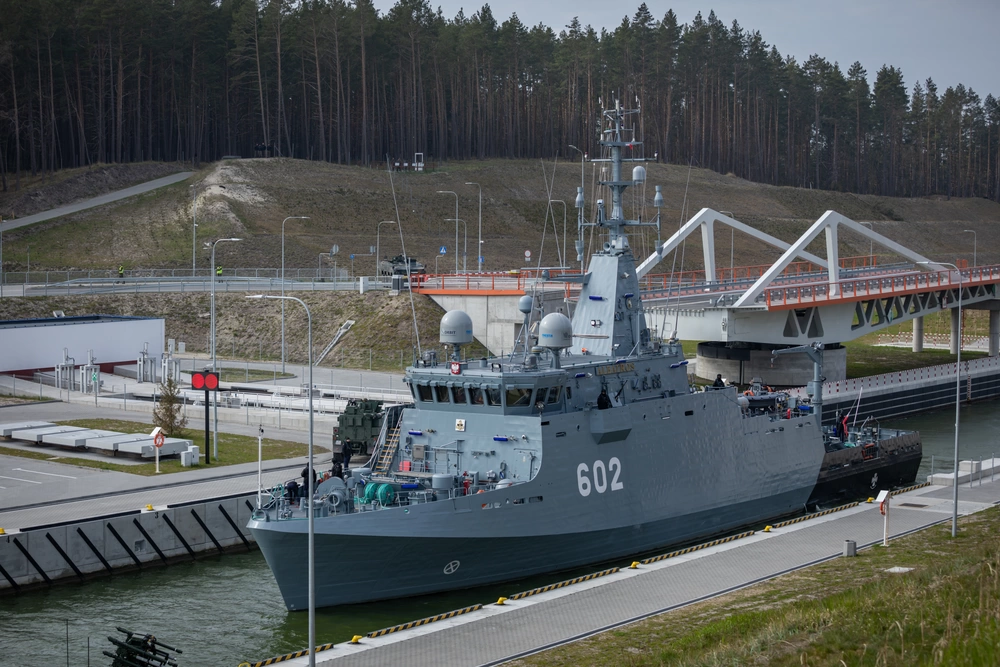
ORP Albatros passing through the canal, 2023

== See also ==
- Augustów Canal
- Elbląg Canal
- Transport in Poland
- Economy of Poland
