= Dworek =

Dworek may refer to the following places in Poland:

- Dworek, Lower Silesian Voivodeship (south-west Poland)
- Dworek, Gmina Stegna, Nowy Dwór County in Pomeranian Voivodeship (north Poland)
- Dworek, Sztum County in Pomeranian Voivodeship (north Poland)
- Dworek, Warmian-Masurian Voivodeship (north Poland)
- Dworek, West Pomeranian Voivodeship (north-west Poland)

== See also ==
- Dwór (manor house) or Dworek, a specific type of a Polish manor house
