= Skowronki, Pomeranian Voivodeship =

Skowronki
- Village
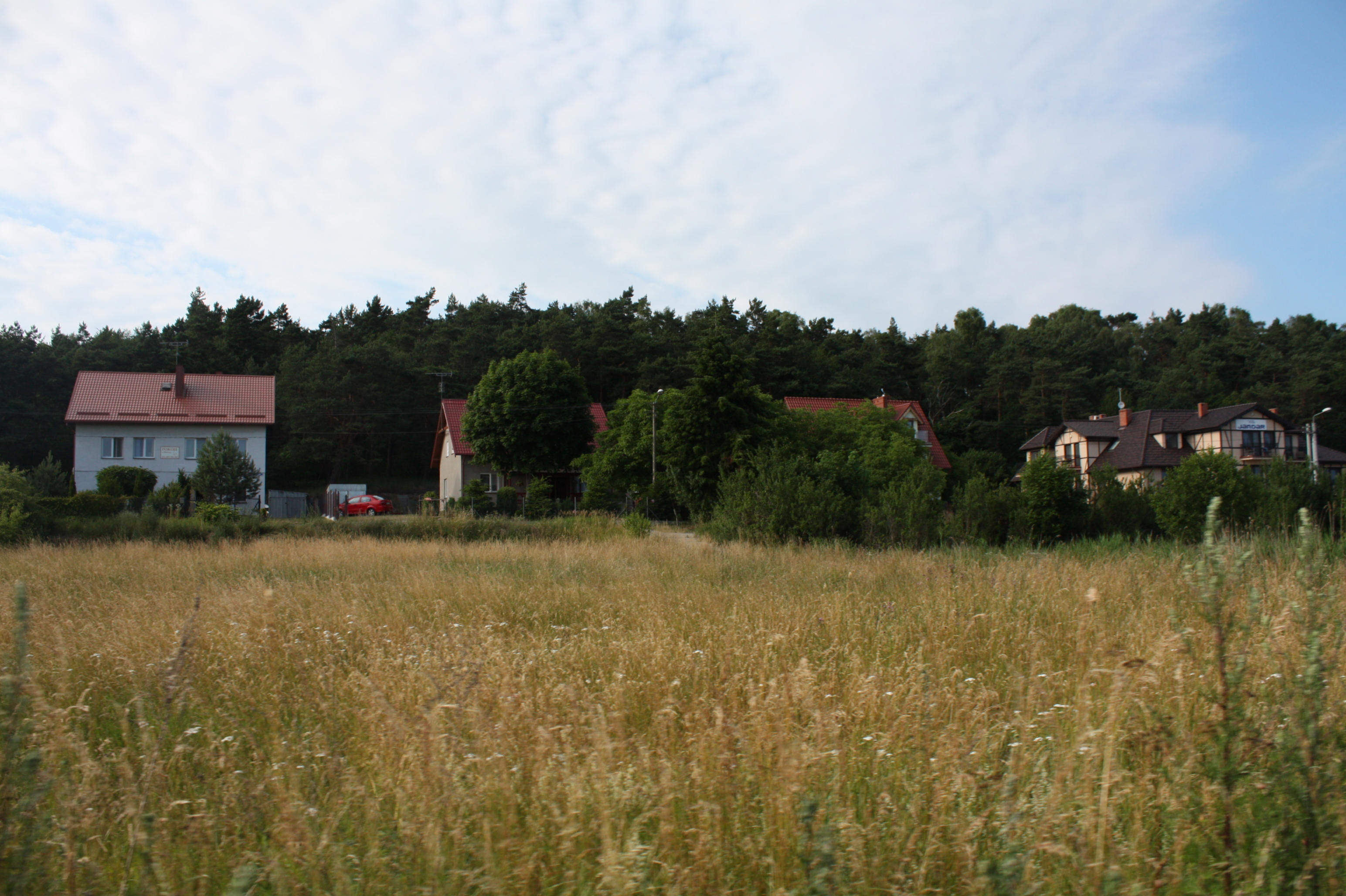

- Location within Poland
- Coordinates: 54°21′7″N 19°17′9″E
- Country: Poland
- Voivodeship: Pomeranian
- County: Nowy Dwór
- Gmina: Sztutowo
- Time zone: UTC+1 (CET)
  - Summer (DST): UTC+2 (CEST)
- Vehicle registration: GND

Skowronki [skɔˈvrɔnki] is a village in the administrative district of Gmina Sztutowo, within Nowy Dwór County, Pomeranian Voivodeship, in northern Poland. It is located in the historic region of Pomerania.

== History ==
The village was a possession of the city of Gdańsk, located in the Pomeranian Voivodeship in the Kingdom of Poland until the Second Partition of Poland in 1793, when it was annexed by Prussia, and from 1871 to 1919 it was also part of Germany. From 1920 to 1939 it formed part of the Free City of Danzig (Gdańsk), and afterwards it was annexed by Nazi Germany at the start of World War II in 1939. It became again part of Poland following Germany's defeat in the war in 1945.

The Vistula Spit canal passes near Skowronki.
