= Gmina Stegna =

Gmina Stegna Stegna Commune
- Gmina
- Flag Coat of arms
- Interactive map of Gmina Stegna
- Coordinates (Stegna): 54°19′35″N 19°6′44″E
- Country: Poland
- Voivodeship: Pomeranian
- County: Nowy Dwór
- Seat: Stegna

Area
  - Total: 169.57 km^{2} (65.47 sq mi)

Population (2006)
  - Total: 9,519
  - Density: 56.14/km^{2} (145.4/sq mi)
- Website: http://www.stegna.ug.gov.pl

Gmina Stegna is a rural gmina (administrative district) in Nowy Dwór County, Pomeranian Voivodeship, in northern Poland.

The gmina seat is Stegna, which lies approximately 13 kilometres (8 mi) north of Nowy Dwór Gdański and 36 km (22 mi) east of the regional capital Gdańsk.

The gmina covers an area of 169.57 square kilometres (65.5 sq mi), and as of 2006 its total population is 9,519.

== Villages ==
Gmina Stegna contains the villages and settlements of Broniewo, Bronowo, Chełmek, Chorążówka, Cysewo, Drewnica, Dworek, Głobica, Izbiska, Jantar, Junoszyno, Kępa Rybińska, Mikoszewo, Niedźwiedzica, Niedźwiedziówka, Nowotna, Popowo, Przemysław, Rybina, Rybinka, Stawidła, Stegienka, Stegna, Stobiec, Świerznica, Szkarpawa, Tujsk, Wiśniówka, Wybicko, Zadwórze, Żuławki and Żuławki Książęce.

== Neighbouring gminas ==
Gmina Stegna is bordered by the city of Gdańsk and by the gminas of Cedry Wielkie, Nowy Dwór Gdański, Ostaszewo and Sztutowo.
