= Nowotna =

- Village
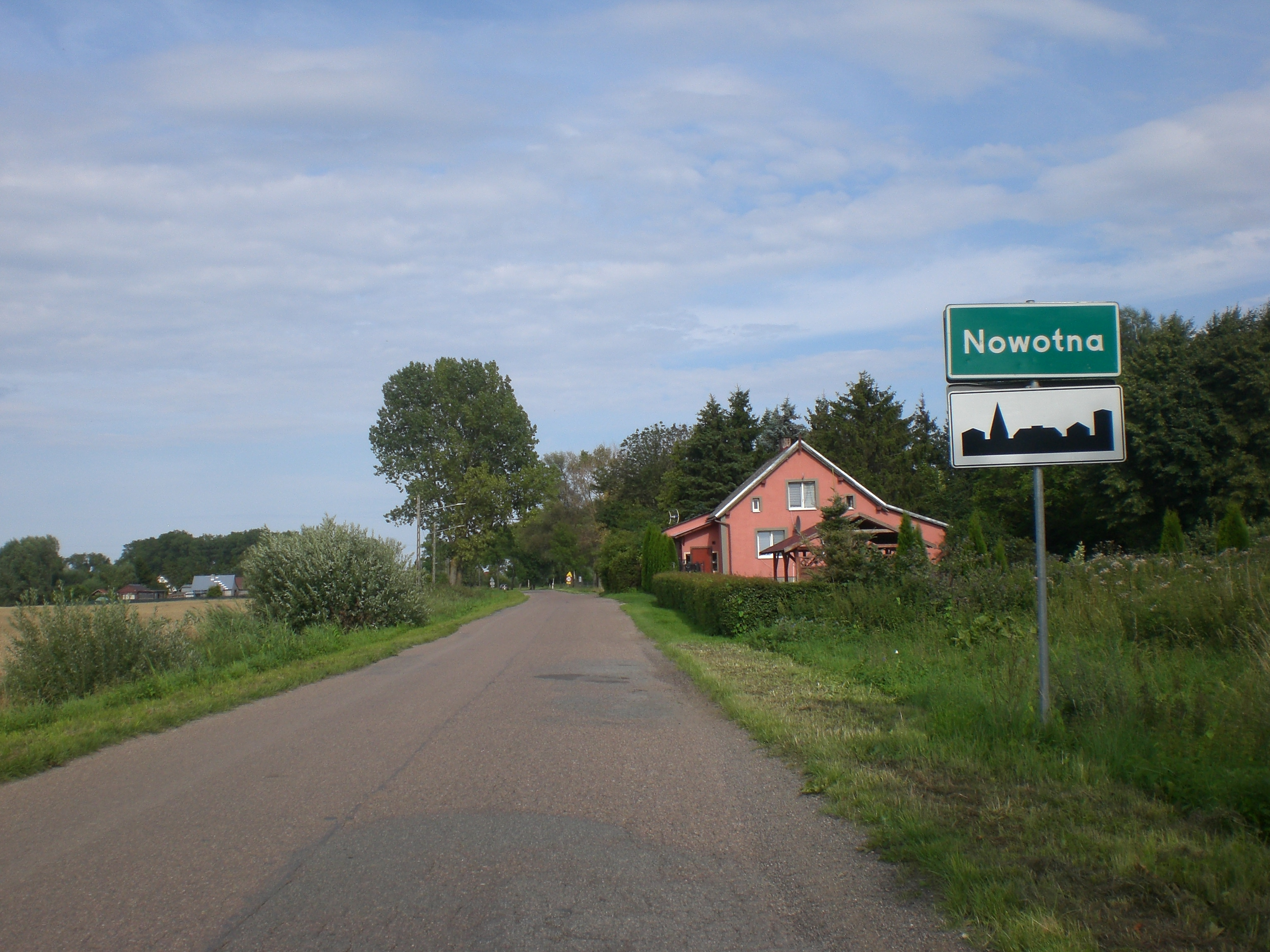

- Location within Poland
- Coordinates: 54°16′3″N 19°7′17″E
- Country: Poland
- Voivodeship: Pomeranian
- County: Nowy Dwór
- Gmina: Stegna
- Elevation: 3 m (9.8 ft)
- Population: 300

Nowotna [nɔˈvɔtna] is a village in the administrative district of Gmina Stegna, within Nowy Dwór County, Pomeranian Voivodeship, in northern Poland.

Before 1772 the area was part of Kingdom of Poland, 1772-1919 Prussia and Germany, 1920-1939 Free City of Danzig (German: Freie Stadt Danzig), 1939 - 1945 Nazi Germany. For the history of the region, see History of Pomerania.
