= Prokhladnaya (river) =

Location
- Country: Russia

Physical characteristics
- Mouth: Vistula Lagoon
  - coordinates: 54.6111°N 20.2408°E
- Length: 77 km (48 mi)
- Basin size: 1,170 km^{2} (450 sq mi)

Prokhladnaya (Russian Прохладная, German Frisching, Polish Świeża) is a river in Kaliningrad Oblast, Russia. It terminates into the Vistula Lagoon. It is 77 kilometres (48 mi) long, and has a drainage basin of 1,170 square kilometres (450 sq mi).
