= Stawidła =

- Settlement
- Location within Poland
- Coordinates: 54°14′6″N 19°2′53″E
- Country: Poland
- Voivodeship: Pomeranian
- County: Nowy Dwór
- Gmina: Stegna

Stawidła [staˈvidwa] is a settlement in the administrative district of Gmina Stegna, within Nowy Dwór County, Pomeranian Voivodeship, in northern Poland.
