= Bronowo, Gmina Stegna =

Bronowo
- Village
- Location within Poland
- Coordinates: 54°17′57″N 19°1′41″E
- Country: Poland
- Voivodeship: Pomeranian
- County: Nowy Dwór
- Gmina: Stegna
- Population: 415
- Time zone: UTC+1 (CET)
  - Summer (DST): UTC+2 (CEST)
- Vehicle registration: GND

Bronowo ([brɔˈnɔvɔ]; German: Brunau) is a village in the administrative district of Gmina Stegna, within Nowy Dwór County, Pomeranian Voivodeship, in northern Poland. It is located in the historic region of Pomerania.

== History ==
The village was a possession of the city of Gdańsk, located in the Pomeranian Voivodeship in the province of Royal Prussia in the Greater Poland Province of the Kingdom of Poland. It was annexed by Prussia in the First Partition of Poland in 1772, and from 1871 to 1919 it was also part of Germany. From 1920 to 1939 it formed part of the Free City of Danzig (Gdańsk), and afterwards it was annexed by Nazi Germany at the start of World War II in 1939. It became again part of Poland following Germany's defeat in the war in 1945.
