= Chełmek, Pomeranian Voivodeship =

Chełmek
- Village
- Location within Poland
- Coordinates: 54°16′20″N 19°10′41″E
- Country: Poland
- Voivodeship: Pomeranian
- County: Nowy Dwór
- Gmina: Stegna
- Time zone: UTC+1 (CET)
  - Summer (DST): UTC+2 (CEST)
- Vehicle registration: GND

Chełmek [ˈxɛu̯mɛk] is a village in the administrative district of Gmina Stegna, within Nowy Dwór County, Pomeranian Voivodeship, in northern Poland.

== History ==
Before 1772, the area was part of the Kingdom of Poland, 1772-1919 Prussia and Germany, 1920-1939 Free City of Danzig, from 1939 to February 1945 it was occupied by Nazi Germany, and afterwards it became again part of Poland. For the history of the region, see History of Pomerania.
