= Wiśniówka, Pomeranian Voivodeship =

Wiśniówka
- Village
- Location within Poland
- Coordinates: 54°16′42″N 19°3′38″E
- Country: Poland
- Voivodeship: Pomeranian
- County: Nowy Dwór
- Gmina: Stegna
- Population: 191

Wiśniówka ([viɕˈɲufka]; German: Küchwerder) is a village in the administrative district of Gmina Stegna, within Nowy Dwór County, Pomeranian Voivodeship, in northern Poland.

For the history of the region, see History of Pomerania.
