= Aestian Island =

Artificial island in Poland

Coordinates: 54.3331°N 19.3816°E

The Aestian Island (Polish: Wyspa Estyjska) is a tentative name of an artificial island in Poland under construction in the Vistula Lagoon as a land fill project, with the infill obtained from the digging of the Vistula Spit canal. The island will cover the area of c. 180–200 hectares (440–490 acres), in the shape of an ellipse with axes of 1,932 and 1,192 m (6,339 and 3,911 ft). It is expected to become a wild-bird habitat. Its location is in the central part of the lagoon about 2.5 km (1.6 mi) off the Vistula Spit, approximately opposite the village of Przebrno.

The shape of the island was marked by steel piles in September 2020. The circumference of the island is being made of granite delivered from quarries in Lower Silesia. The interior is to be filled with the sand from the Vistula Spit canal and the dredging of the navigable fairway for which the canal is intended.

The name has been selected by a public poll and it is to be formally approved by the Ministry of the Interior and Administration. Other polled suggestions were: Rukwiel (Searocket Island), Wodniczka (Aquatic Warbler Island), Bursztynowa (Amber Island) and Brajan Chlebowski Island. During the pre-contest, some even suggested the name San Escobar. The selected name references the name of the local ancient Aesti tribe, as reflected in the oldest known name of the Vistula Lagoon: Old English Estmere, based on Old Prussian Aīstinmari, which means "Lagoon of the Aesti".
