= Stobiec, Pomeranian Voivodeship =

Village in Poland

Stobiec
- Village
- Location within Poland
- Coordinates: 54°15′56″N 19°10′3″E
- Country: Poland
- Voivodeship: Pomeranian
- County: Nowy Dwór
- Gmina: Stegna
- Population: 184

Stobiec ([ˈstɔbjɛt͡s]; German: Stobbendorf) is a village in the administrative district of Gmina Stegna, within Nowy Dwór County, Pomeranian Voivodeship, in northern Poland.

For the history of the region, see History of Pomerania.
