= Szkarpawa =

River in Poland

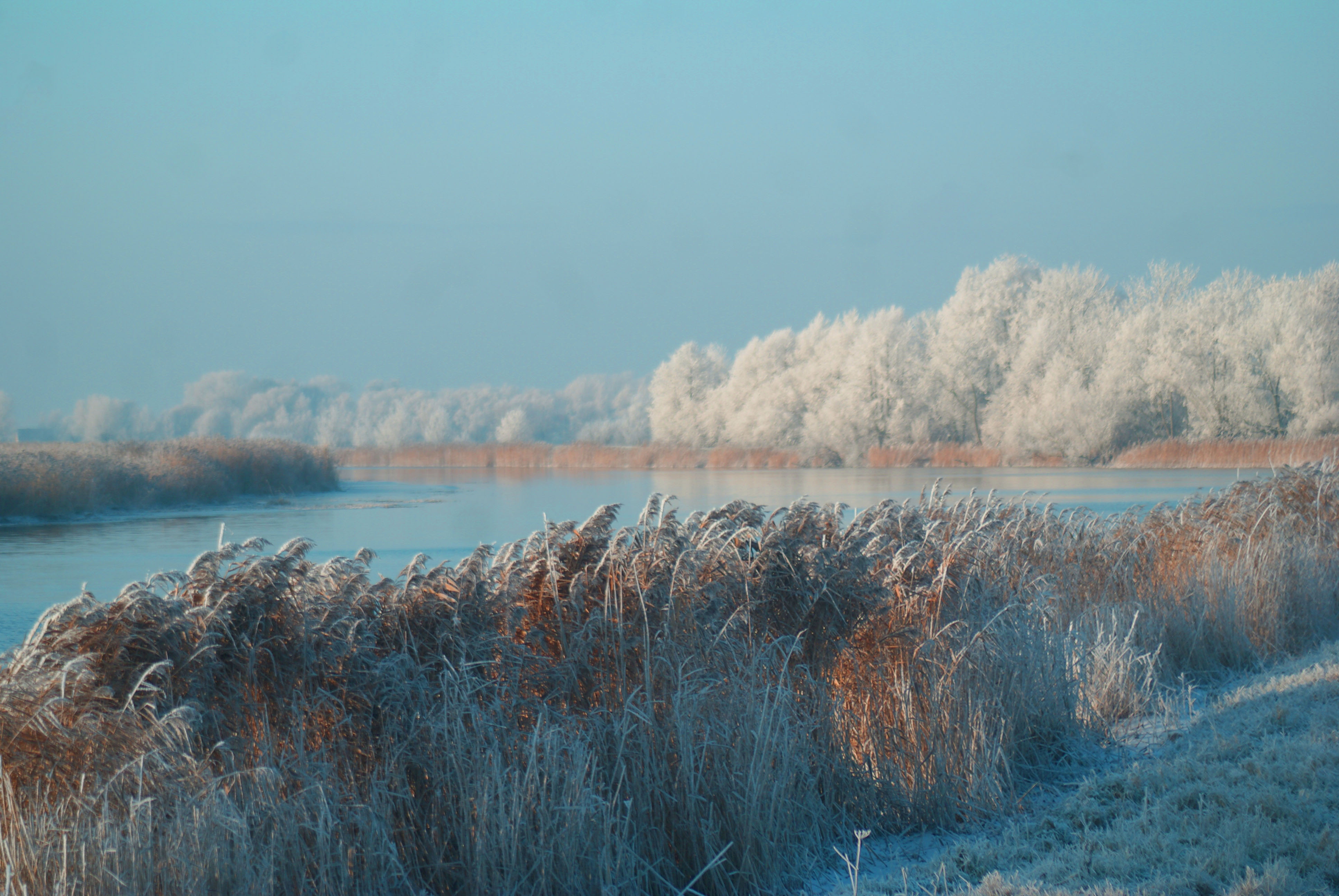

Location
- Country: Poland

Physical characteristics
- Mouth
  - location: Vistula Lagoon
  - coordinates: 54.270°N 19.253°E

The Szkarpawa (Polish pronunciation: [ʂkarˈpava], German: Elbinger Weichsel) is a distributary river in the Vistula delta of northern Poland. It branches off the Vistula near Drewnica (at the Gdańsk Head) and flows eastward to the Vistula Lagoon at Osłonka. In the past it was known as Wisła Elbląska (English translation: Elbląg Vistula)
