= Żuławki Książęce =

- Village
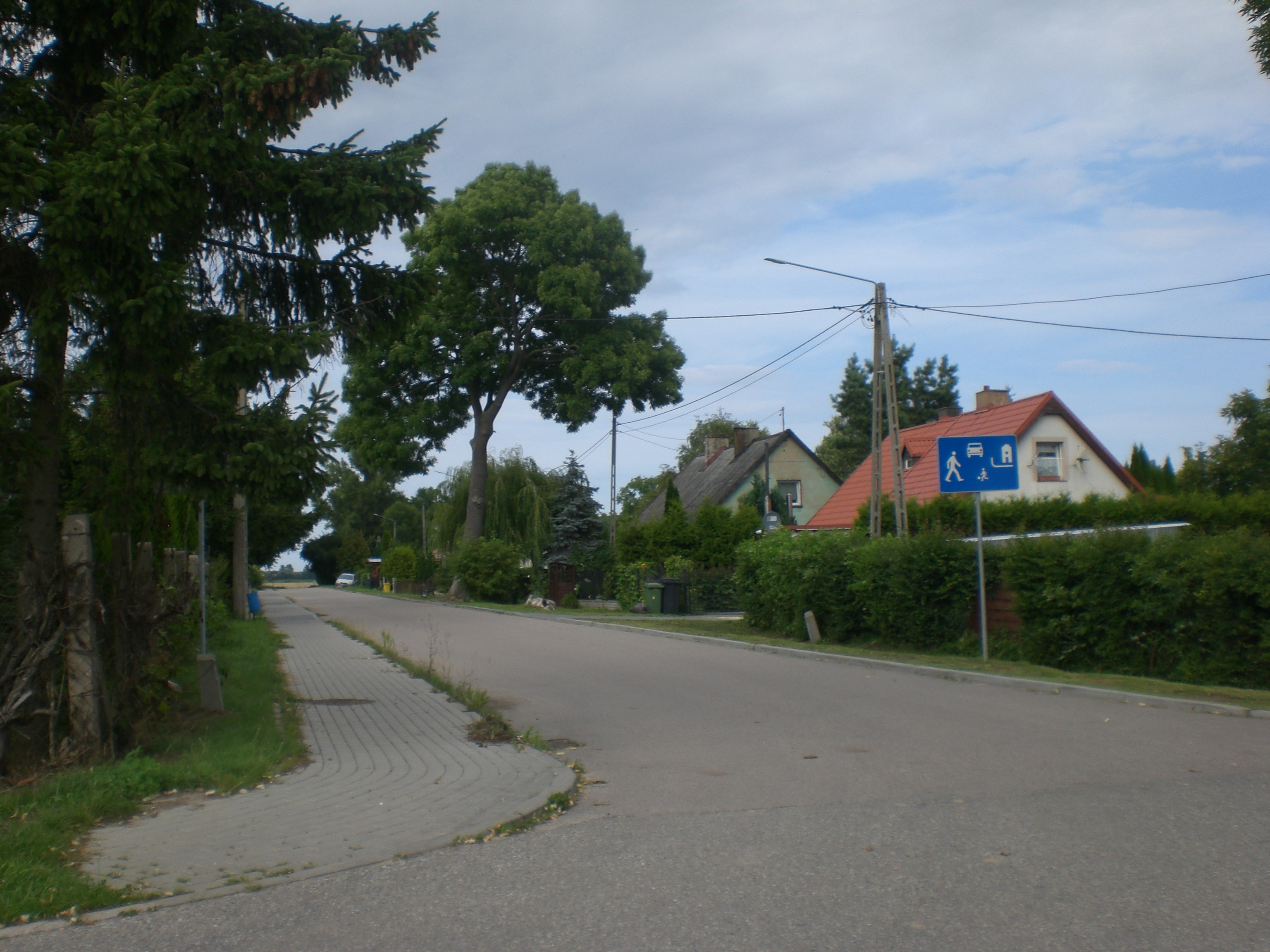
- The village of Żuławy Książęce

- Location within Poland
- Coordinates: 54°16′59″N 18°58′57″E
- Country: Poland
- Voivodeship: Pomeranian
- County: Nowy Dwór
- Gmina: Stegna

Żuławki Książęce [ʐuˈwafki kɕɔ̃ˈʐɛnt͡sɛ] is a village in the administrative district of Gmina Stegna, within Nowy Dwór County, Pomeranian Voivodeship, in northern Poland.

For the history of the region, see History of Pomerania.
