= Niedźwiedziówka =

- Village
- Location within Poland
- Coordinates: 54°14′24″N 19°3′36″E
- Country: Poland
- Voivodeship: Pomeranian
- County: Nowy Dwór
- Gmina: Stegna

Niedźwiedziówka [ɲɛd͡ʑvjɛˈd͡ʑufka] is a village in the administrative district of Gmina Stegna, within Nowy Dwór County, Pomeranian Voivodeship, in northern Poland.

Before 1793 the area was part of Kingdom of Poland, 1793-1919 Prussia and Germany, 1920-1939 Free City of Danzig, September 1939 - February 1945 Nazi Germany. For the history of the region, see History of Pomerania.
