= Chorążówka =

- Village
- Location within Poland
- Coordinates: 54°17′23″N 19°4′31″E
- Country: Poland
- Voivodeship: Pomeranian
- County: Nowy Dwór
- Gmina: Stegna
- Population: 71

Chorążówka ([xɔrɔ̃ˈʐufka]; German: Junkertroyl) is a village in the administrative district of Gmina Stegna, within Nowy Dwór County, Pomeranian Voivodeship, in northern Poland.

Before 1793 the area was part of Polish Royal Prussia, in 1793-1919 Prussia and Germany, 1920-1939 the Free City of Danzig, 1939-45 Nazi Germany. For the history of the region, see History of Pomerania.
