= Wybicko =

- Village
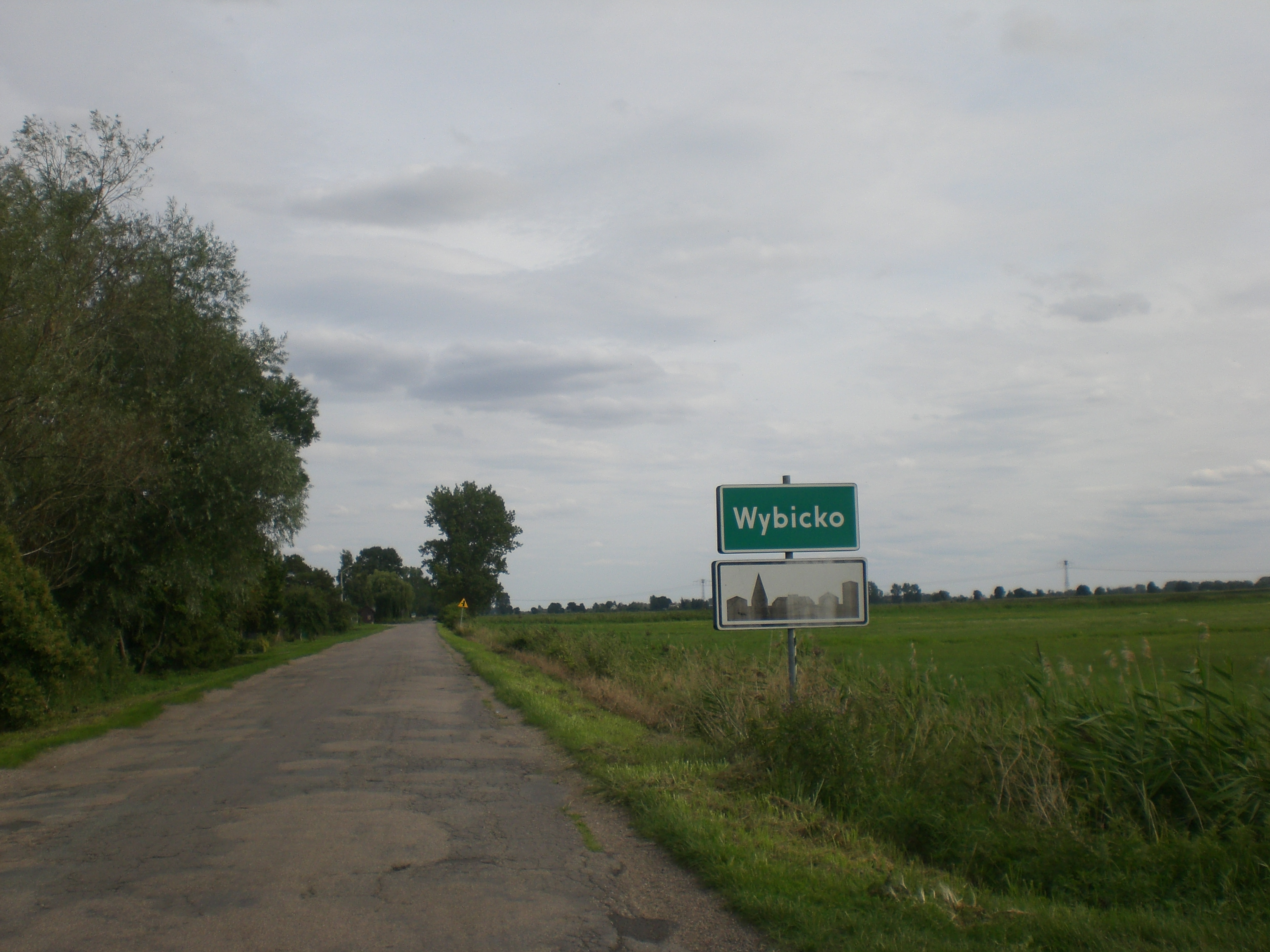

- Location within Poland
- Coordinates: 54°14′24″N 19°3′36″E
- Country: Poland
- Voivodeship: Pomeranian
- County: Nowy Dwór
- Gmina: Stegna
- Population: 175

Wybicko (Polish: [vɨˈbit͡skɔ]; German: Beiershorst) is a village in the administrative district of Gmina Stegna, within Nowy Dwór County, Pomeranian Voivodeship, in northern Poland.

For the history of the region, see History of Pomerania.
