= Stegienka =

- Village
- Location within Poland
- Coordinates: 54°18′38″N 19°3′20″E
- Country: Poland
- Voivodeship: Pomeranian
- County: Nowy Dwór
- Gmina: Stegna
- Population: 330 (2,008)

Stegienka ([stɛˈɡʲɛnka]; German: Steegnerwerder) is a village in the administrative district of Gmina Stegna, within Nowy Dwór County, Pomeranian Voivodeship, in northern Poland.

Before 1793 the area was part of Polish Royal Prussia, in 1793–1919 of Prussia and Germany, in 1920–1939 of the Free City of Danzig, and in 1939–45 of Nazi Germany. It became Polish in 1945. For the history of the region, see History of Pomerania.
