= Świerznica, Pomeranian Voivodeship =

Świerznica
- Village
- Location within Poland
- Coordinates: 54°16′9″N 19°5′20″E
- Country: Poland
- Voivodeship: Pomeranian
- County: Nowy Dwór
- Gmina: Stegna
- Population: 142

Świerznica (Polish: [ɕfjɛʐˈɲit͡sa]; German: Kalteherberge) is a village in the administrative district of Gmina Stegna, Nowy Dwór County, Pomeranian Voivodeship, Poland.

For the history of the region, see History of Pomerania.
