= Junoszyno =

- Village
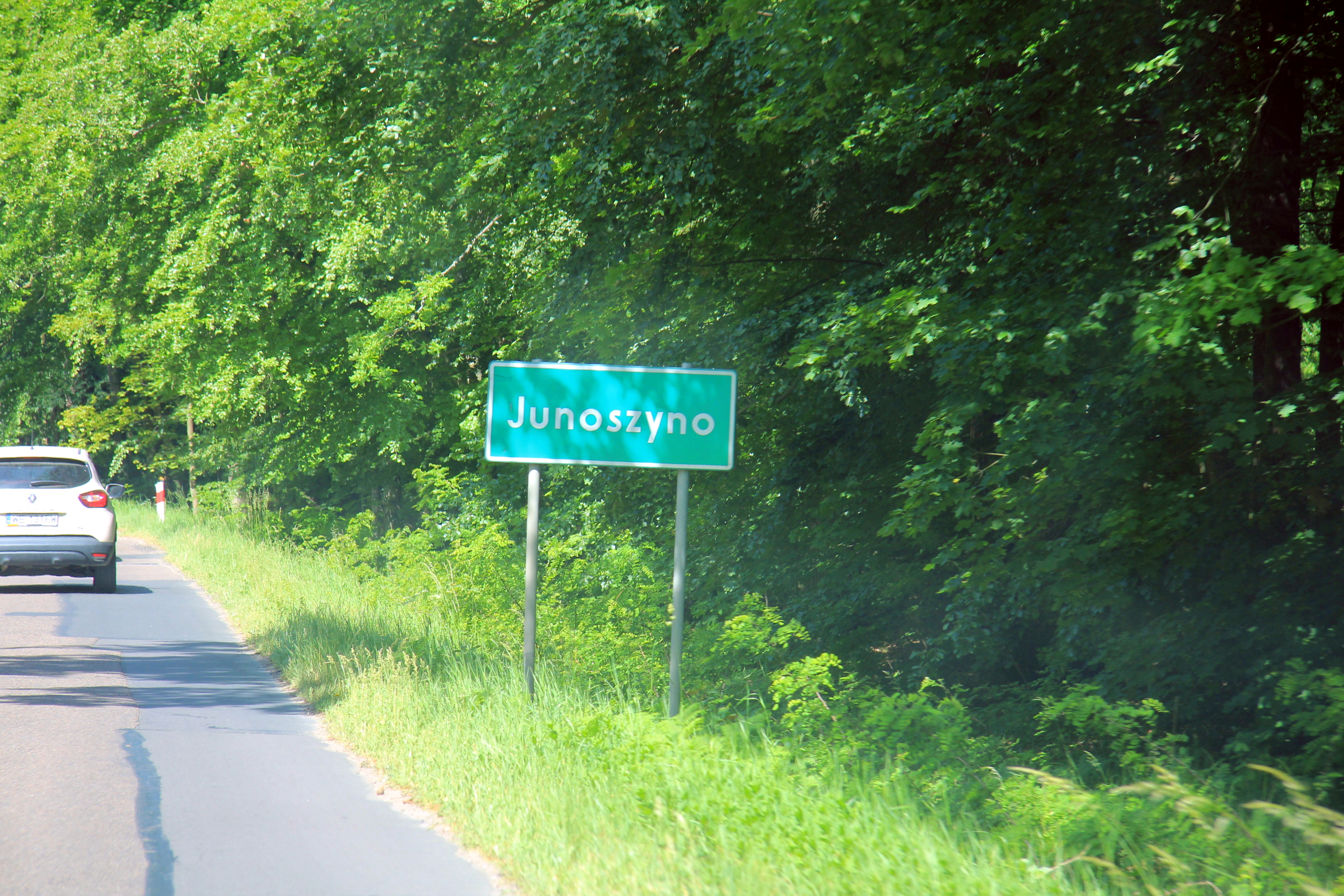

- Location within Poland
- Coordinates: 54°19′47″N 19°4′59″E
- Country: Poland
- Voivodeship: Pomeranian
- County: Nowy Dwór
- Gmina: Stegna
- Population: 419

Junoszyno ([junɔˈʂɨnɔ]; German: Junkeracker) is a village in the Gmina Stegna district of the Nowy Dwór County, in the Pomeranian Voivodeship of northern Poland.

== See also ==
- History of Pomerania
