= Vistula Lagoon =

Fresh water lagoon on the Baltic Sea

- Zalew Wiślany (Polish); Калининградский залив (Russian)
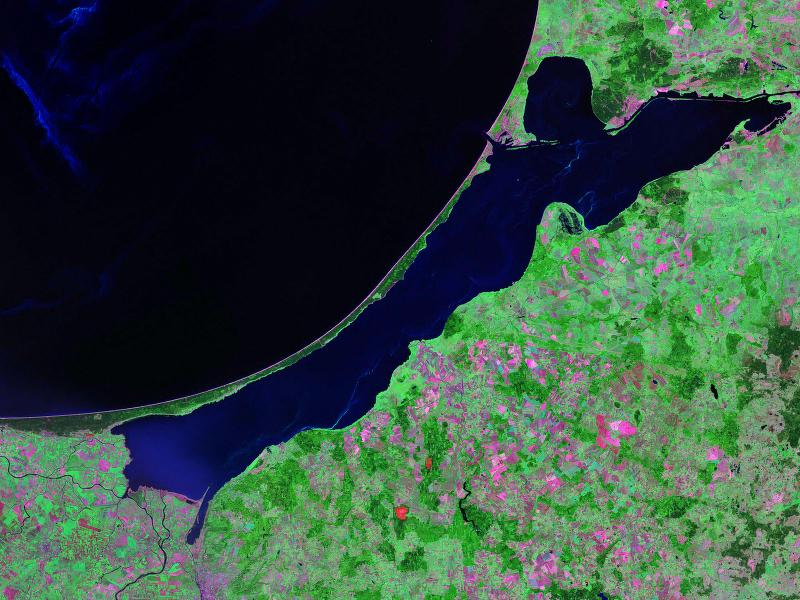
- Landsat photo of the Vistula Lagoon

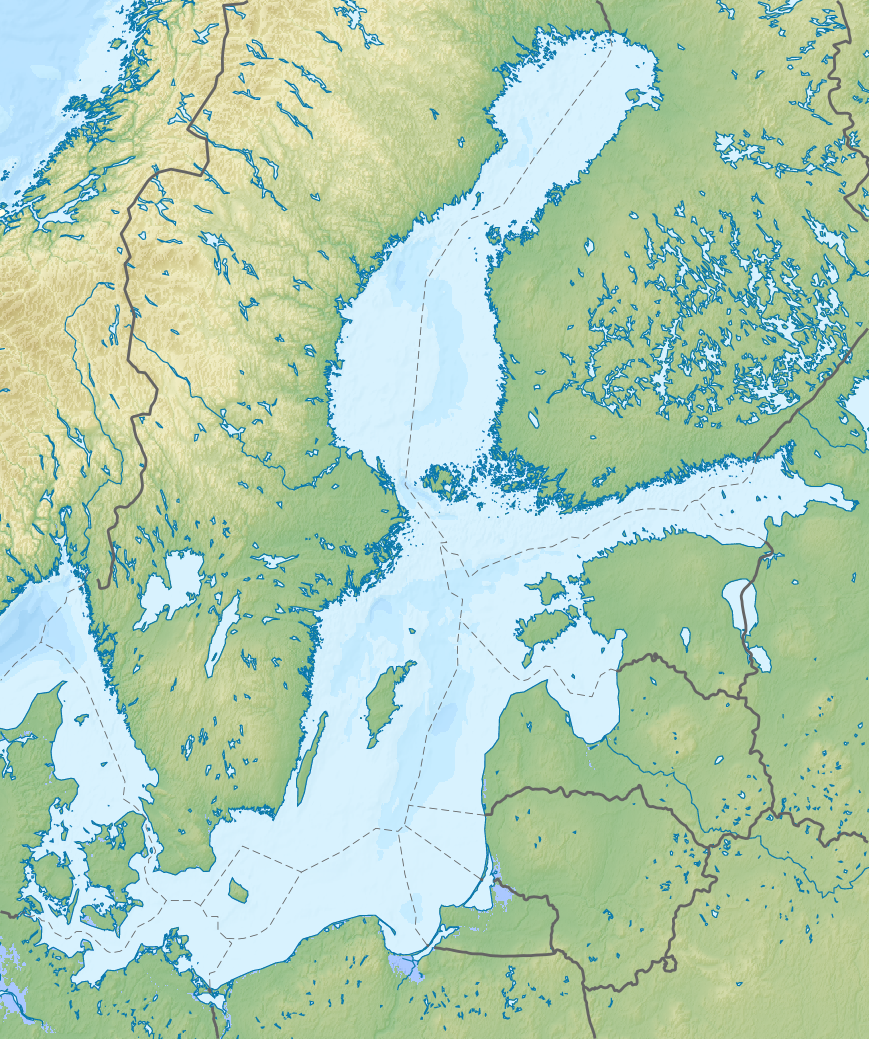
- Location within Poland Location within Baltic Sea Location within Europe
- Location: Poland, Russia
- Coordinates: 54°27′N 19°45′E
- Type: Lagoon
- Etymology: Vistula River
- Primary inflows: Bauda, Elbląg, Nogat, Pasłęka, Szkarpawa, Pregolya, Prokhladnaya, Wisła Królewiecka
- Max. length: 90.7 km (56.4 mi)
- Max. width: 13 km (8.1 mi)
- Surface area: 838 km^{2} (324 sq mi)
- Average depth: 2.7 m (8 ft 10 in)
- Salinity: 3‰
- Settlements: Tolkmicko, Frombork, Krynica Morska, Baltiysk, Primorsk

The Vistula Lagoon (Note: Polish: Zalew Wiślany; Russian: Калининградский залив; German: Frisches Haff, lit. 'fresh lagoon'; Lithuanian: Aistmarės) is a brackish water lagoon on the Baltic Sea roughly 90 kilometres (56 mi) long, 10 to 24 kilometres (6 to 15 mi) wide, and up to 5 metres (17 ft) deep, separated from the Gdańsk Bay by the Vistula Spit. It is split between Poland and Russia (Kaliningrad exclave).

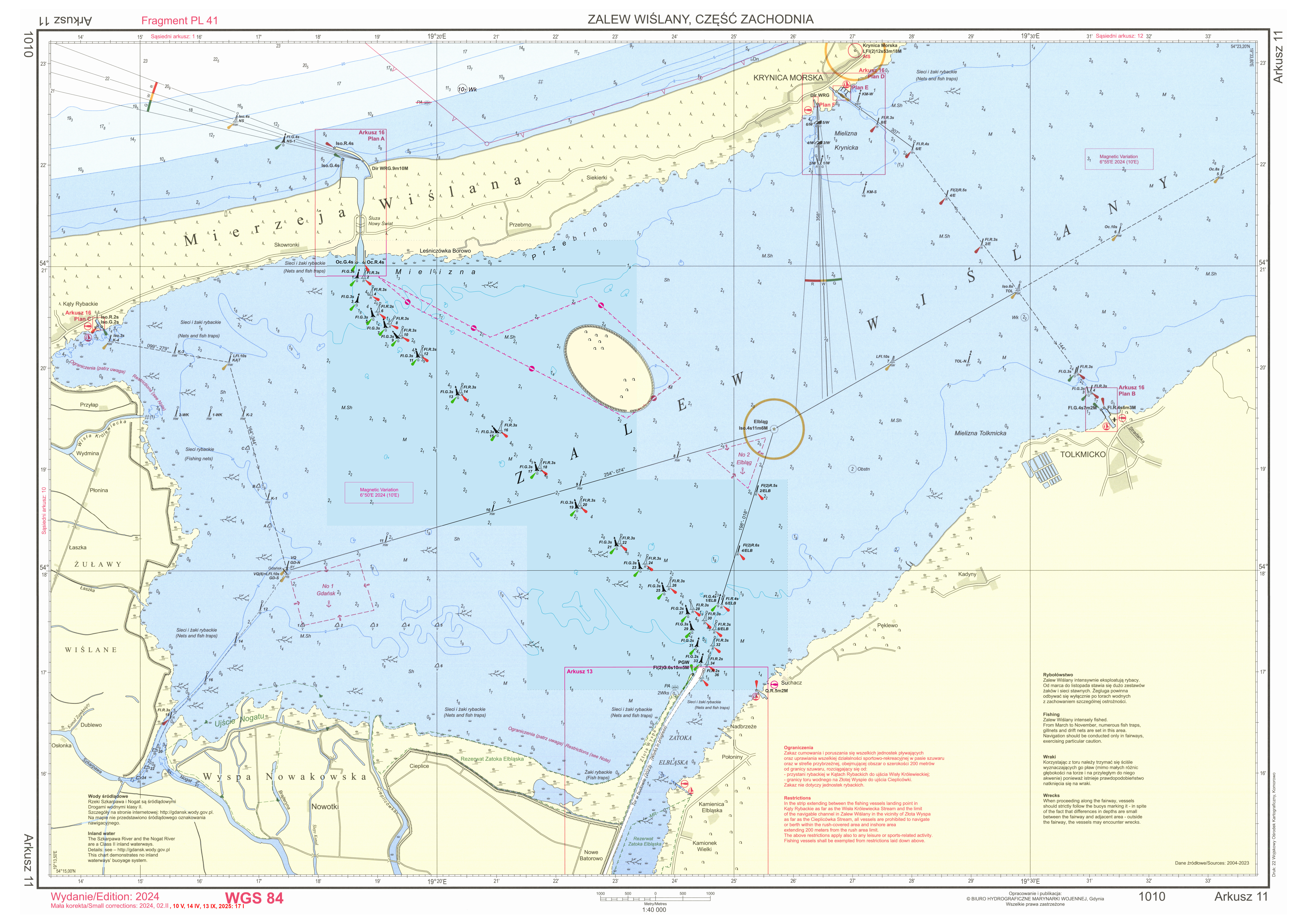
The western part of Vistula Lagoon on the official nautical chart issued by the Hydrographic Office of the Polish Navy in 2024

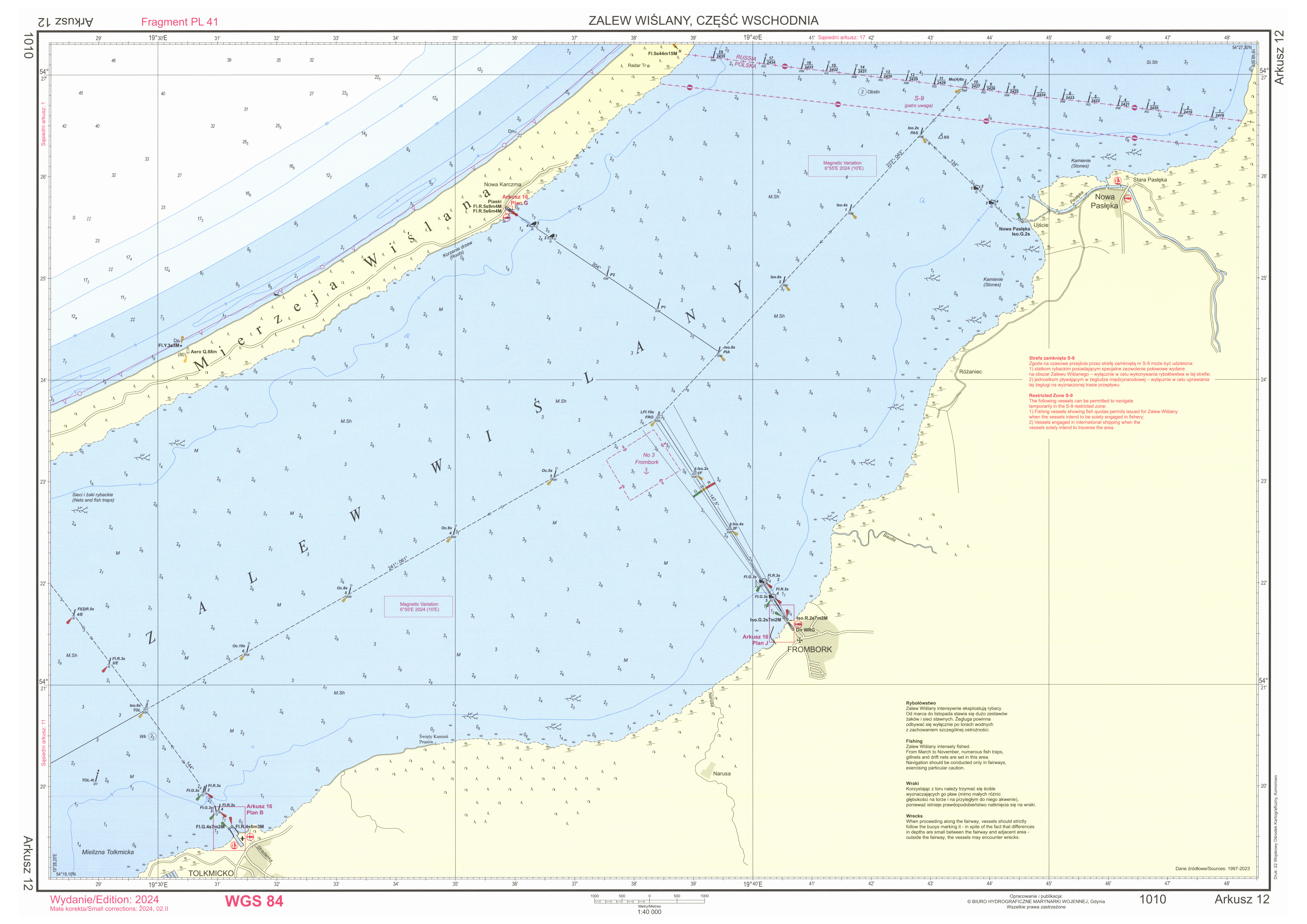
The eastern part of Vistula Lagoon on the official nautical chart issued by the Hydrographic Office of the Polish Navy in 2024

== Geography ==
The lagoon is a mouth of a few branches of the Vistula River, notably Nogat and Szkarpawa, and of the Pregolya River.

The lagoon is split between Poland (including the localities of Elbląg, Tolkmicko, Frombork, and Krynica Morska) and Russia's Kaliningrad Oblast (including the localities of Kaliningrad, Baltiysk, and Primorsk). Before 2022, the only water route from the lagoon out to the Gdańsk Bay was the Strait of Baltiysk, in Russia's portion of the lagoon. The Polish port of Elbląg used to see a substantial amount of trading traffic on the lagoon, but that declined due to international tensions and silting. Between 2019 and 2022, Poland built the Vistula Spit canal in their own portion of the lagoon, to create another water route out of the lagoon. Kaliningrad and Baltiysk are currently major seaports on the lagoon.

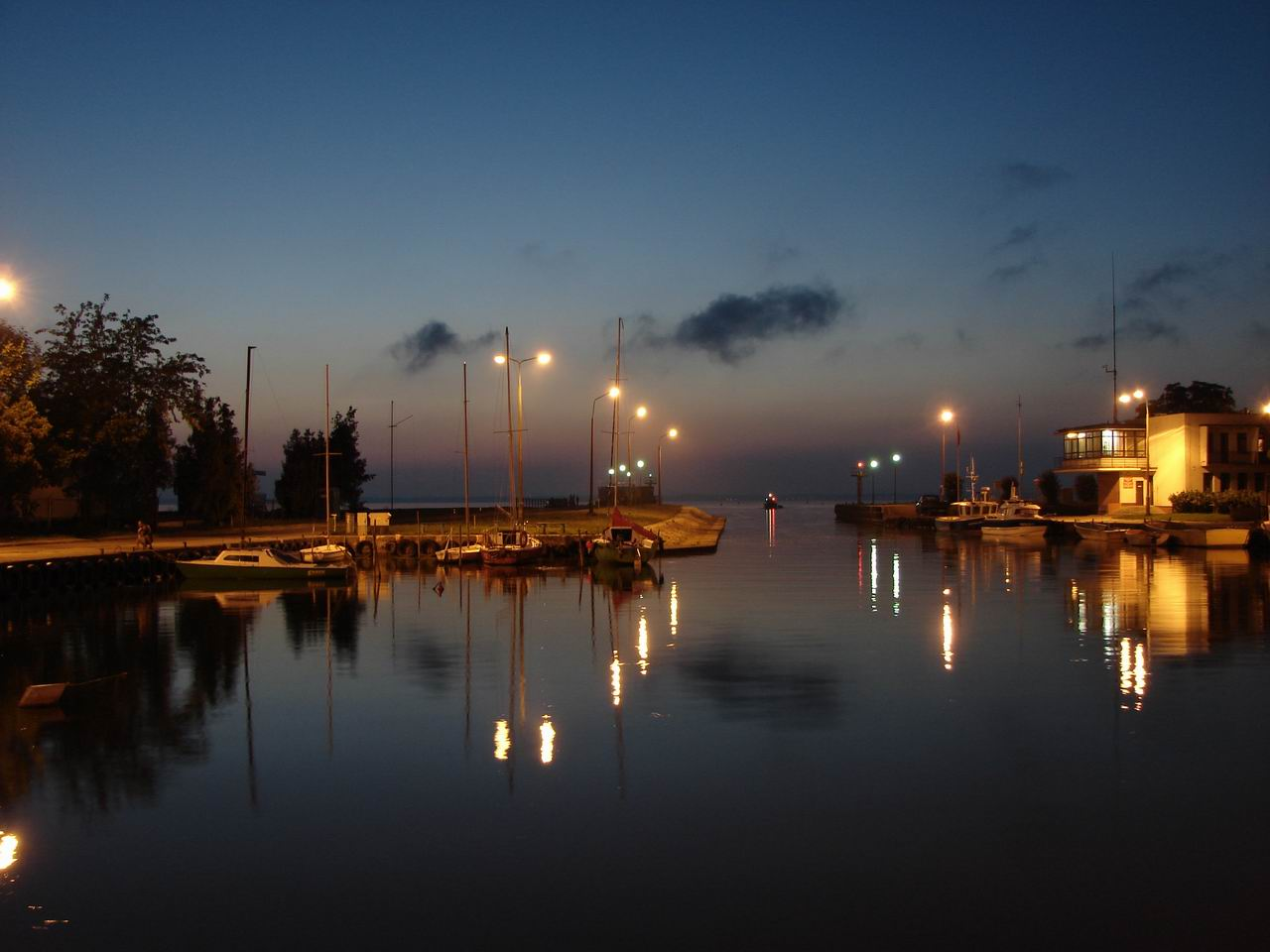
Small port on the Vistula Lagoon in Frombork, Poland

It is an Important Bird Area of Poland.

== Etymology ==
The earliest version of the name of the Vistula Lagoon has been recorded in historical sources by Wulfstan of Hedeby at the end of the 9th Century as Estmere. It is an Anglo-Saxon rendition of the Old Prussian Aīstinmari, which was the name for the lagoon. The name was the fusion of two Old Prussian words:

- Aistei
- *mari - "lagoon (a body of water cut off from a larger body by a reef of sand), fresh water bay".

So, the oldest known meaning of the name of the Vistula Lagoon was "The lagoon or sea of the Aesti". The Old Prussian name is still used in Modern Lithuanian as Aistmarės, which preserves the original meaning.

Over three hundred years later, in the first half of the 13th Century, the name of the Vistula Lagoon occurs in deeds issued by the Teutonic Order in Latin as Mare Recens (1246 - "mare" - a pool or lake or sea and "recens" - fresh) in contrast to the contemporaneous name for the Baltic Sea - Mare Salsum (Salty Sea). Then in 1251 there is a reference to Mare Recens et Neriam and finally in 1288 Recenti Mari Hab, which evidently corresponds with the German "Frisches Haff". The modern German name, Frisches Haff, is derived from an earlier form, Friesisches Haff.

The Russian name of the lagoon since 1946 is Kaliningradskiy zaliv (Калининградский залив), it means 'Kaliningrad Bay'.

== History ==
From the first half of the 13th c. the lagoon was part of the State of the Teutonic Order. In 1454, King Casimir IV Jagiellon incorporated the region to the Kingdom of Poland upon the request of the anti-Teutonic Prussian Confederation. Following the peace treaty of 1466, it remained a part of Poland, with the western part forming part of the Polish provinces of Royal Prussia and Greater Poland, and the eastern part being a Polish fief, held by the Teutonic Knights and Ducal Prussia. The surrounding area was inhabited by Poles, Germans and Kursenieki. Following the First Partition of Poland, the territory formed part of the Kingdom of Prussia, which became part of the German Empire in 1871. From 1920 to 1939 it was split between Germany and the Free City of Danzig. In 1945, the western part, comprising 43.8%, became again part of Poland, whereas the eastern part fell to the Soviet Union (now within Russia). Administratively, it is divided between the Polish Pomeranian and Warmian-Masurian voivodships, and the Russian Kaliningrad Oblast.

The nearly extinct ethnic group or Kursenieki lived on the Vistula Spit, by the lagoon.

From January until March 1945, throughout the evacuation of East Prussia, refugees from East Prussia crossed the frozen lagoon on their way west after the Red Army reached the coast of the lagoon near Elbing on January 26. Attacked by Soviet aircraft, thousands were killed or fell through the broken ice.

== See also ==
- Curonian Lagoon
- Aestian Island
