= Stegna =

- Village
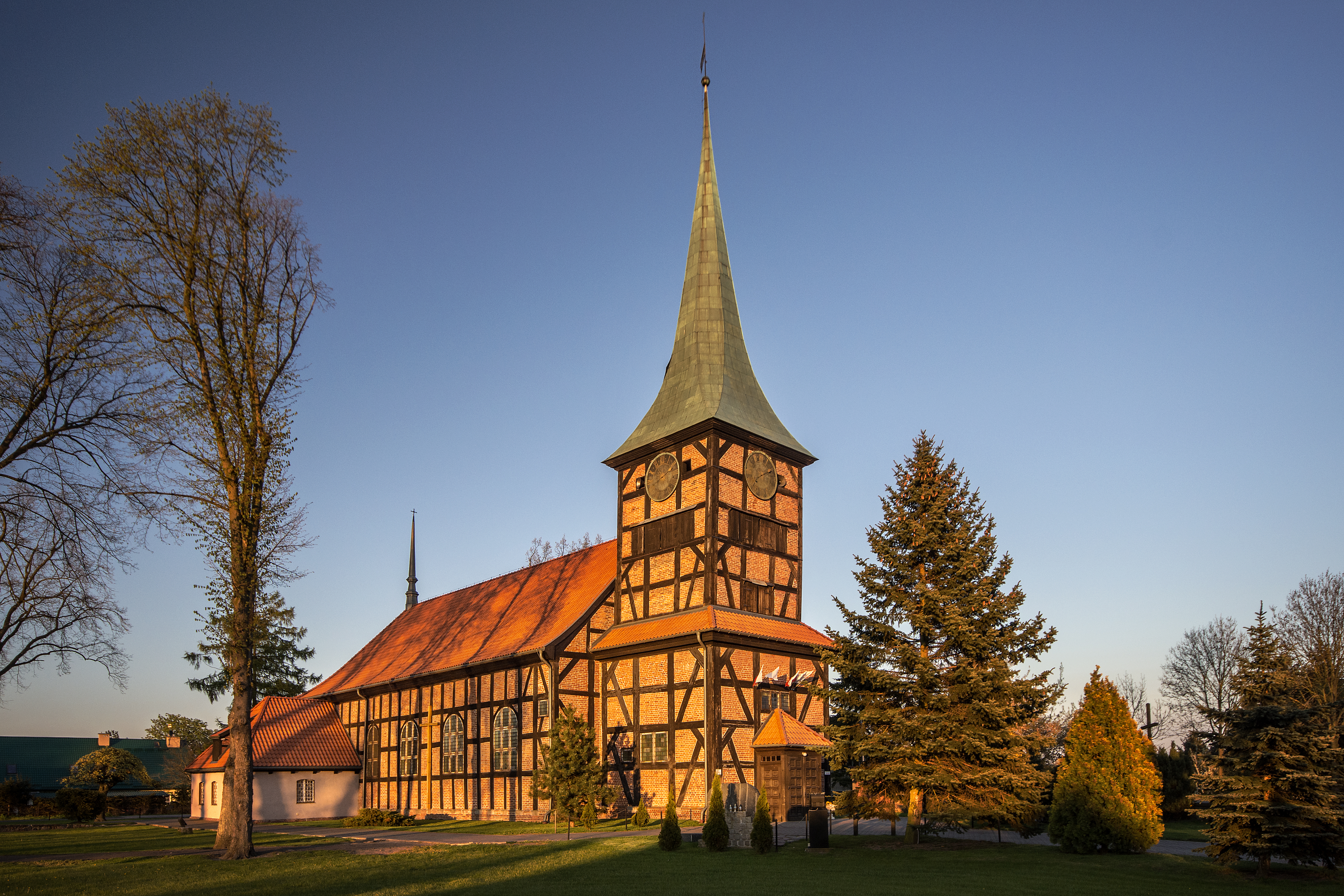
- Catholic Church of the Sacred Heart of Jesus, a timber-framed church in Stegna

- Coat of arms

- Location within Poland
- Coordinates: 54°19′35″N 19°6′44″E
- Country: Poland
- Voivodeship: Pomeranian
- County: Nowy Dwór
- Gmina: Stegna

Population
  - Total: 2,337
- Time zone: UTC+1 (CET)
  - Summer (DST): UTC+2 (CEST)
- Vehicle registration: GND

Stegna ([ˈstɛɡna]; German: Steegen) is a village in Nowy Dwór County, Pomeranian Voivodeship, in northern Poland. It is the seat of the gmina (administrative district) called Gmina Stegna.

== History ==
The first documents confirming the existence of a Roman Catholic church in Stegna date back to the 14th century. According to sources from 1465, there was a Gothic church in Stegna. The settlement was a possession of the city of Gdańsk, located in the Pomeranian Voivodeship of the Kingdom of Poland.

In 1609, the German pastor Georg Klein built a small wooden Lutheran church, which burned down in 1676. Only the tower, organ, altar furnishings and a bell remained from the Thirty Years' War. On the site of the old Lutheran church began on March 25, 1681, the works on the construction of a new one under the direction of Peter Willer - architect, surveyor and mechanic of the city of Gdańsk. The construction of the baroque church, according to the chronicle, was very expensive (e.g. the carpenter Peter Kamrath received: 2000 guilders, 8 barrels of beer and 6 spruces. Andreas Bosche received 1150 guilders for building the tower and wood from the old tower that has been preserved). On November 29, 1681 - the first Sunday in Advent - preacher Martinus Krüger consecrated the church. On May 25, 1682, the construction of the choir was completed, and on June 15, 1683, the organ was expanded. The tower is a work by Bosche, the cross and the flag by Daniel Madler. The works were finally completed on November 17, 1683 - this year can be seen on the flag, which many researchers incorrectly interpret as the year the church was built. The new tower also has a bell from 1643, which survived the fire, which still chimes at 12 noon every day, and two larger ones - from 1732. The bell, over three hundred years old, bears an inscription in Latin: "Domine, da pacem in diebus nostris", which means: "Lord, give peace to our time."

The village was annexed by Prussia in the First Partition of Poland in 1772, and from 1871 it formed part of the German Empire. In 1919, it became part of the Free City of Danzig (Gdańsk), and during the invasion of Poland at the start of World War II in 1939 it was occupied and annexed by Nazi Germany. In 1942, the German Government established a forced labour subcamp of the Stutthof concentration camp in the village.

The church was taken away from the Lutheran Church in 1945 when the inhabitants were forced to flee westward and Stegna became again part of Polart of Poland after World War II.
