= Poland–Russia border =

International border

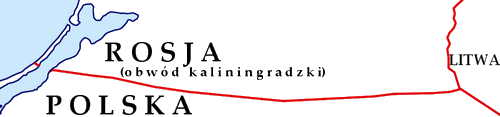

Characteristics
- Entities: Poland; Russia
- Length: 206 km (128 mi), 418 km (260 mi) or 416 km (258 mi)

History
- Established: 1945; Polish–Soviet border agreement of August 1945
- Current shape: 1991; Dissolution of the Soviet Union

Polish and Russian boundary markers

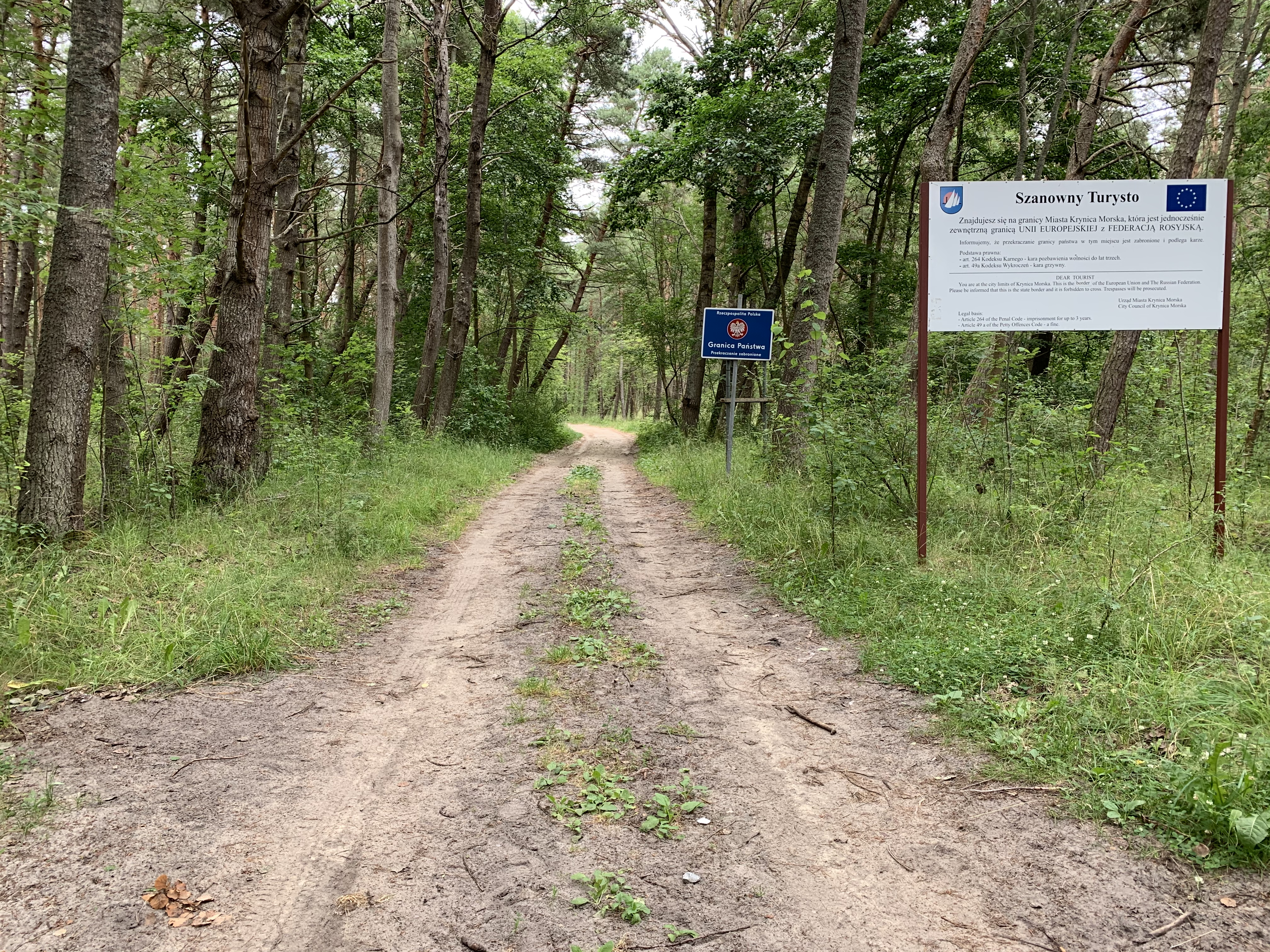
The border road near Nowa Karczma, Nowy Dwór Gdański County, July 2020

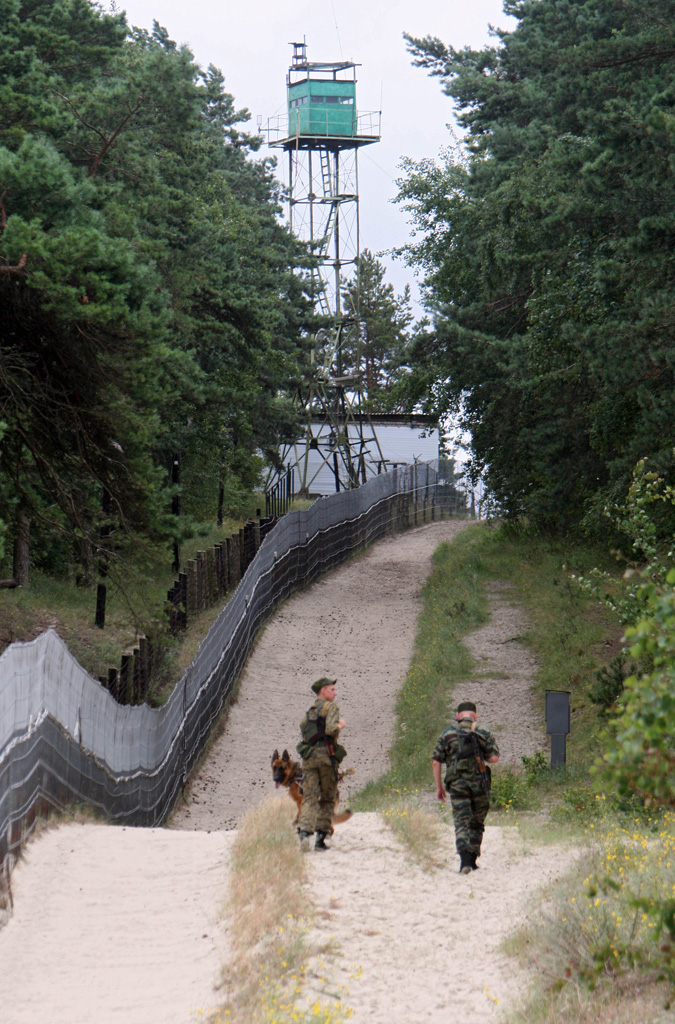
Russian border guards on Vistula Spit, August 2011

The modern Poland–Russia border is a 232 kilometres (144 mi) long, nearly straight-line division between the Republic of Poland and the Kaliningrad Oblast, an exclave of the Russian Federation. The current border is a result of the Soviet Union's annexation of parts of East Prussia in the aftermath of World War II. In 2004, it became part of the external border of the European Union.

== History ==
=== Historical Poland-Russia borders ===
The history of borders between Poland and Russia can be traced to the early history of both nations, with one of the earliest notable events related to it being the 1018 intervention of Polish ruler Boleslaw I's in the Kievan succession crisis of 1015–1019. Following the formation of the Polish–Lithuanian Commonwealth the eastern border of Poland, most of it with the Tsardom of Muscovy, a predecessor state to Russia, stretched from the Baltic Sea in the north to the Black Sea in the south. During the period of the partitions of Poland, which shifted the Russian borders some 480 kilometres (300 mi) west, several small Polish statelets such as the Duchy of Warsaw and the Congress Kingdom shared a border with the Russian Empire. Following World War I, the new Second Polish Republic shared a 1,407 kilometres (874 mi) long border with the Soviet Union, shaped under the Polish-Soviet War and confirmed by the Treaty of Riga.

=== World War II and the creation of a new Poland-Russia border ===
With the establishment of the People's Republic of Poland following World War II, a new border was drawn. Initially, the towns of Gierdawy and Iławka came under Polish control with arrangements for Polish administration already made. However, the Soviet Union subsequently annexed these areas into the Kaliningrad Oblast of the Russian SFSR in December 1945, creating the border that would become the modern Polish-Russian border after the fall of the Soviet Union The resulting Polish-Soviet border, consisting of Polish borders with the Russian SFSR, Lithuanian SSR, Byelorussian SSR and Ukrainian SSR, was 1,321 kilometres (821 mi) long, later reduced to 1,244 kilometres (773 mi) after a minor modification to the Polish-Ukrainian border in the 1951 Polish–Soviet territorial exchange.

The Soviets installed a system of various engineered protection facilities up to a few kilometres wide such as ploughed strips of earth and no-man zone on the new border between the Kaliningrad and Poland had. The introduction of an artificial border between Kaliningrad and Poland led to, among other things, the disruption of existing railway lines. The railway line running westwards from Goldap had a junction at Iława Pruska (since 1946, Bagrationovsk) with a route running south to Bartoszyce, and further west of that junction laid another one at Święta Siekierka (since 1946, Mamonovo) with a route running south to Braniewo. This railway was the best connection between the northern counties of the Masurian District (after 1946, Olsztyn Voivodeship) with the port city of Elbląg and, from there, the rest of Poland. The drawing of the border in a straight line severed this connection, resulting in a significant economic weakening of the areas from Goldap County to Elbląg County. On October 9, 1945, the government representative in the Masurian District, having noticed the dramatic economic consequences of the railway line being severed by the new border, pleaded to the Polish government to negotiate an improvement to the situation in the final border agreement. Elbląg, lying on the coast of the Vistula Lagoon some 30 kilometres (19 mi) away from the new border, also saw the Strait of Baltiysk, which prior to the completion of the Vistula Spit canal in 2022 was the only entry point into the lagoon, fall into Soviet hands. In August 1945, At a banquet in Moscow attended by a Polish government delegation, Joseph Stalin announced the closure of the port, and the Polish government's official request, made on 11 August 1945, for the strait to be reopened was rejected by the Soviets, thwarting plans to rebuild the city as a significant port and shipbuilding hub.

The Soviet economic model and the military nature of Kaliningrad led to a lack of cooperation between the oblast and neighboring Polish areas, and was irrelevant to Polish-Soviet economic and cultural relations during the first decade of its existence. Cooperation between the Polish and Soviet authorities was lacking to such a degree that it made difficult even basic matters like regulating watercourses that crossed the border, such as the Łyna. Only occasional cross-border initiatives were undertaken, for example in November 1953, fish processing specialists from Gdynia met with colleagues from Kaliningrad and the three Baltic republics at a working conference in Riga.

The lack of an officially demarcated border was seen as an issue, and in April 1956, top Soviet authorities suggested that the Polish government took steps towards official demarcation. The response sent by the Polish People's Republic Embassy in Moscow to its headquarters regarding this matter on this matter contained an annotation from the deputy director of the first department of the Polish Ministry of Foreign Affairs, Kazimierz Korolczyk, who suggested that this issue be resolved at an unspecified future date under "...more favorable circumstances". On August 8, in a note to Adam Rapacki, the Polish Minister of Foreign Affairs, it was announced that diplomats of the Polish People's Republic had been instructed to exchange views on the matter. Meanwhile, the Soviets insisted on talks soon as, in their opinion, rumours were being spread in the West that the lack of border demarcation in this area called the Potsdam Agreement itself into question. However, the Polish October meant that practically no attention was being paid to this issue, and the final communique from the conclusion of the Polish-Soviet talks held in Moscow on November 14–18 of the same year did not mention the Poland-Kaliningrad border at all. The new leader of the Polish United Workers' Party, Władysław Gomułka, who for years had been striving for West Germany to recognize the Oder–Neisse line, was interested in advancing the talks on the final demarcation of the border with Kaliningrad in order to deprive Western political opponents of their ability to use the unsettled border to their political advantage. On March 4, 1957, a delegation from Poland, headed by Foreign Minister Rapacki, arrived in Moscow. Two days later the agreement on demarcating the section of the border adjacent to the Baltic Sea was signed by Rapacki and Andrei Gromyko, Minister of Foreign Affairs of the USSR.

The official demarcation agreement of the boundary was finalized on 5 March 1957, and read:

The Contracting Parties confirm that the existing State frontier between the Union of Soviet Socialist Republics and the Polish People's Republic in the sector adjoining the Baltic Sea, as established by the Berlin Conference in 1945, runs from frontier mark No. 1987, set up at the junction of the frontiers of the Russian Soviet Federal Socialist Republic (Kaliningrad Region), the Lithuanian Soviet Socialist Republic and the Polish People's Republic at the demarcation of the Soviet-Polish State frontier in 1946-1947, in a general westerly direction 0.5 kilometres north of the inhabited locality of Zytkiejmy, 4 kilometres north of the inhabited locality of Gołdap, 0.5 kilometres south of the inhabited locality of Krylovo, 3 kilometres south of the inhabited locality of Zheleznodorozhny, 2 kilometres south of the inhabited locality of Bagrationovsk, 4 kilometres south of the inhabited locality of Mamonovo, 7 kilometres north of the inhabited locality of Braniewo (formerly Braunsberg) and thence across the Kaliningradsky Zaliv (Zalew Wislany) and the Baltiiskaya Kosa (Mierzeja Wislana) to a point on the west shore of this spit 3 kilometres north-east of the inhabited locality of Nowa Karczma (known as Piaski) and is part of the town of Krynica Morska (Föglers) (the distances between the inhabited localities and the frontier are approximate).

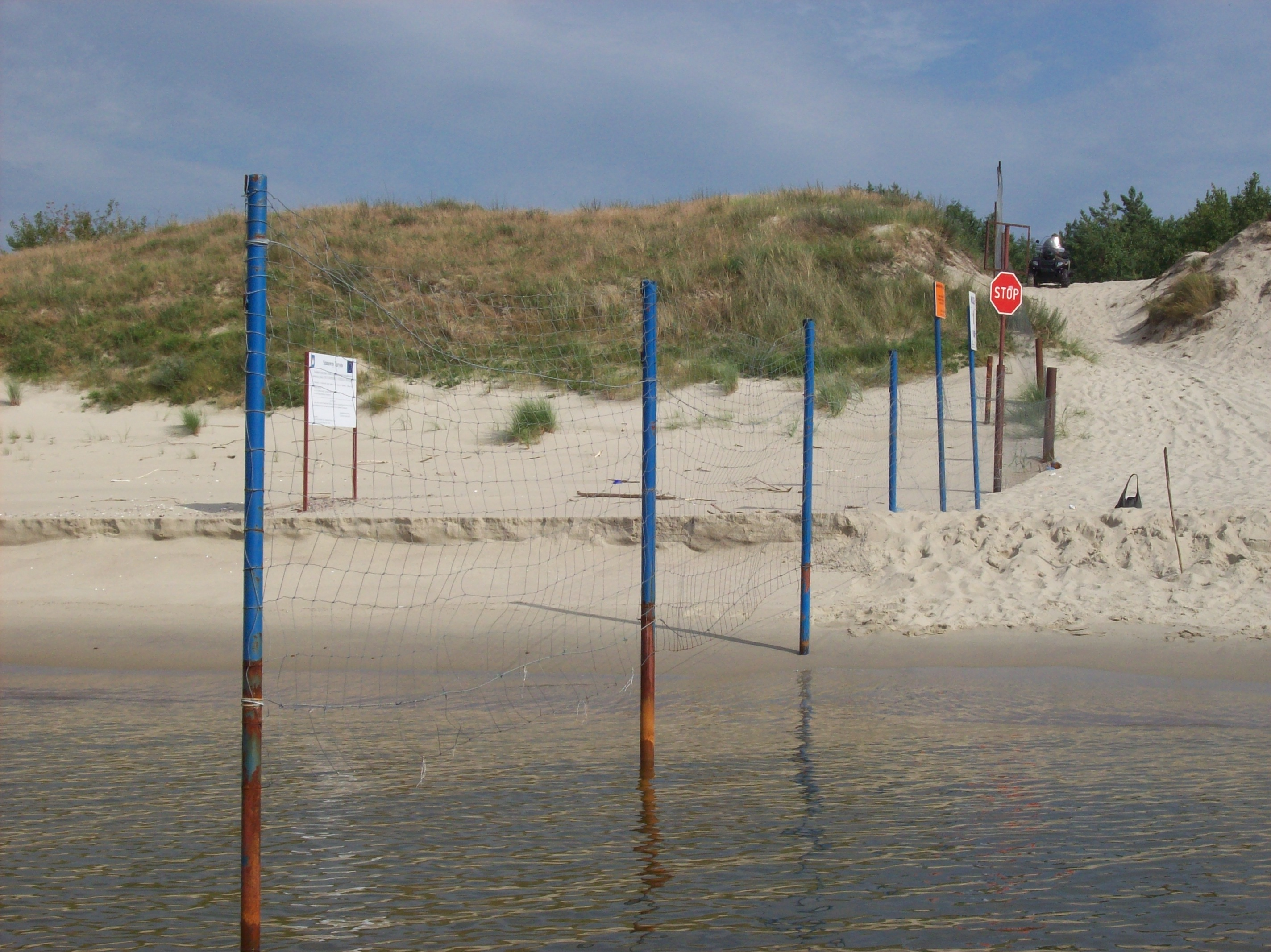
Fence where the border crosses the coast line

In practice the agreement was incomplete as it failed to address several places where the border lacked a clear definition. During the work of the Delimitation Commission, the District National Council in Węgorzewo, followed by the Provincial National Council in Olsztyn, suggested that a 5 kilometres (3.1 mi) section of road between the Polish Ruskie Pola with the now Russian Kryłów should be ceded to Poland, as this section of the road was the only convenient route between the village of Zielony Ostrów and the rest of the country. In return the Polish side offered to hand over to the Soviet Union a similar section which connected two towns, Bogatowo and Korniewo, on the Soviet side of the border, but this proposal ended up not being adopted by the commission. However, other Polish proposals were adopted as part of the final agreement: Poland was granted a relatively small area north of the town of Żytkiejmy for the townsfolk to farm and a 1.5 kilometres (0.93 mi) section of road connecting Szczurkowo with Ostre Bardo. In return Poland ceded a crossroads near Mażucie, which had been cut off by the border line, and the Polish part of the lake near Bagrationovsk. The Delimitation Commission completed its work on 10 September 1957.

== Modern border ==
The fall of the Soviet Union transformed the Polish-Soviet border into the modern Poland-Russia, Poland–Lithuania, Poland-Belarus and Poland-Ukraine borders. The Poland–Russia border were confirmed in a 1992 treaty between Poland and Russia Polish-Russian, ratified in 1993. The fall of the Soviet Union also meant that the Kaliningrad Oblast exclave that makes up the Russian side of the border became separated from the rest of Russia by international borders rather than internal Soviet ones.

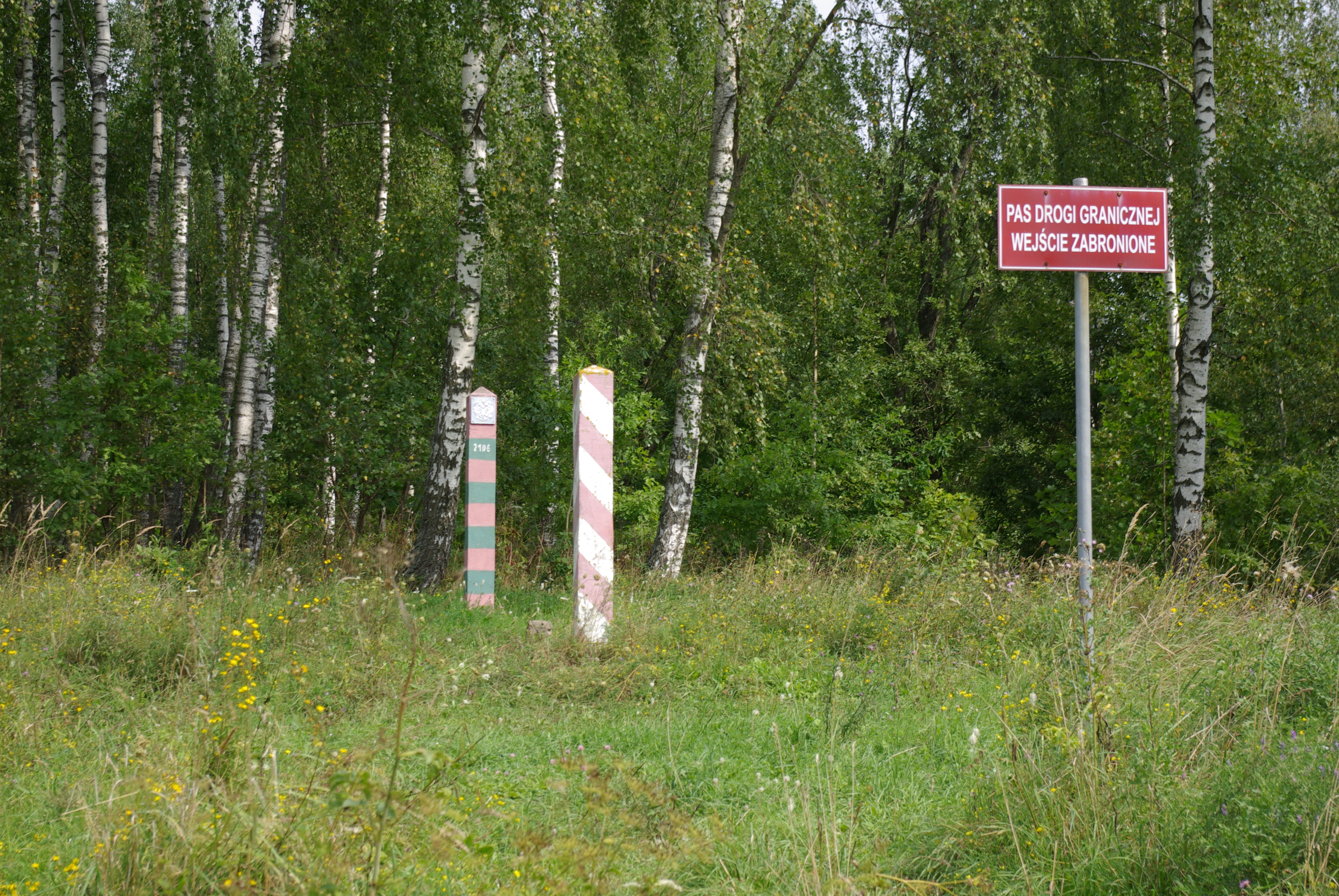
The border in the area of Gmina Banie Mazurskie, August 2010

For most of the 232 kilometres (144 mi) long border the Polish side consists of the Warmian-Masurian Voivodeship, with a segment in the extreme east being part of the Podlaskie Voivodeship and the westernmost segment, located on the Vistula Spit, being part of the Pomeranian Voivodeship. 210 kilometres (130 mi) of the border is land with the remaining 22 kilometres (14 mi) consisting of the Vistula Lagoon and the Baltic Sea.

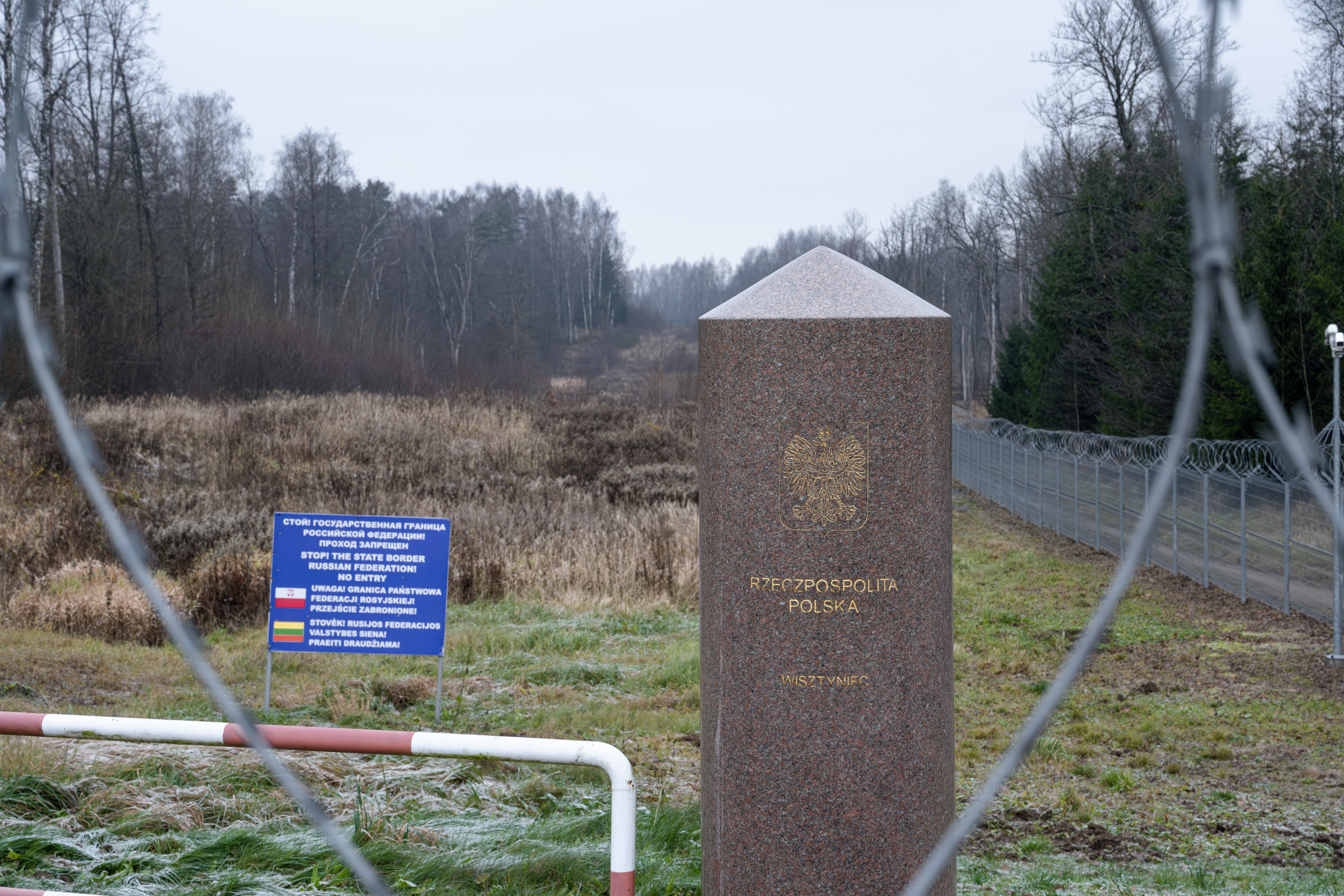
Since 2022 the Poland-Lithuania-Russia tripoint pillar is off-limits to the public

When Poland joined the European Union in 2004, the border became an external border of the European Union. It is one of five borders between the European Union and Russia.

As of 2008, there were three road crossings, Gołdap-Gusev, Bezledy-Bagrationovsk and Gronowo-Mamonovo, and three train crossings, Braniewo-Mamonovo, Skandawa-Zheleznodorozhny and Głomno-Bagrationovsk. In 2010, the largest road crossing up to that point was opened at Grzechotki-Mamonovo.

In the first quarter of 2012, the Polish-Russian border saw the least traffic out of the borders Poland shares with the non-European Union countries (the others being the Poland-Ukraine border and the Poland-Belarus border). For that period, a majority of the individuals crossing the borders did so for the explicit purpose of short term, usually single-day, shopping; this was the case with 45% of foreigners entering Poland, and 87% of Poles entering Russia. Compared to traffic across the other non-EU Polish borders, a much larger percentage crossed the borders for the purpose of tourism (22% of Russians and 7% of Poles) and transit (16.5% of Russians).

On November 2, 2022, Poland's Minister of National Defence Mariusz Błaszczak announced the construction of a barrier along the Poland–Russia border, with reference to Poland believing that Russia would use the border to illegally transport African and Asian immigrants to Europe. The barrier is planned to reach 3 metres (9.8 ft) high and include cameras and motion detectors. The move to construct the barrier came in response to Kaliningrad allowing from 1 October onwards for a far greater level of international flights to its airport.

=== Border area ===
Because Kaliningrad Oblast is a small, homogeneous exclave surrounded by the European Union, in 2011 the whole Oblast was granted the status of border area eligible for special local border traffic rules. In return, the following Polish counties were granted the same status:

- in the Pomeranian Voivodeship: Puck, Gdynia, Sopot, Gdańsk city and county, Nowy Dwór, Malbork
- in the Warmian-Masurian Voivodeship: Elbląg city and county, Braniewo, Lidzbark, Bartoszyce, Olsztyn city and county, Kętrzyn, Mrągowo, Węgorzewo, Giżycko, Gołdap, Olecko

Additional border crossings were being considered as late as 2013, but halted as a result of worsened relations between Poland and Russia after the 2014 annexation of Crimea.

== Border crossings ==
As of July 2026 there are 2 open road border crossings from Poland to the Kaliningrad Oblast. All cross border railway traffic has been suspended.

Image	Polish name	Russian name	Polish Road	Russian Road	Type of crossing	Status	Coordinates
	Braniewo	Mamonovo	-	-	railway	suspended	54.436690°N 19.873666°E
	Gronowo	Mamonovo 1	DK 54	A 194	road	closed	54.434133°N 19.897285°E
	Grzechotki	Mamonovo 2	S 22 / E28	R 516 / E28	road	OPEN	54.422110°N 20.069206°E
	Bezledy	Bagrationovsk	S 51	A-195	road	OPEN	54.371735°N 20.660240°E
	Głomno	Bagrationovsk	-	-	railway	suspended	54.371556°N 20.698028°E
	Skandawa	Zheleznodorozhny	-	-	railway	suspended	54.333177°N 21.305291°E
	Gołdap	Gusev	DK 65		Road	closed	54.341249°N 22.298090°E

== See also ==
- Curzon Line
- Poland–Russia relations
- Polish–Russian Wars
- Enclave and exclave
