= Vistula Spit Landscape Park =

Protected area in Poland

Coordinates: 54°21′09″N 19°15′06″E

- Park Krajobrazowy Mierzeja Wiślana
- IUCN category V (protected landscape/seascape)
- Interactive map of Vistula Spit Landscape Park
- Location: Pomeranian Voivodeship
- Area: 44.10 km^{2} (17.03 sq mi)
- Established: 1985

Vistula Spit Landscape Park (Park Krajobrazowy Mierzeja Wiślana) is a protected area (Landscape Park) on the Vistula Spit in northern Poland. The Park was established in 1985, and covers an area of 44.10 square kilometres (17.03 sq mi).

The Park lies within Pomeranian Voivodeship, in Nowy Dwór County (Krynica Morska, Gmina Sztutowo).

Within the Landscape Park are two nature reserves.

The park is included in the Natura 2000 network (entirely in the habitat area and partly in the bird one) and in the HELCOM Marine Protected Areas Baltic System of Protected Areas as MPA No. 85 Vistula Lagoon and Mierzeja Wislana.
