= George Shevelov =

Ukrainian-American linguist (1908–2002)

- Юрій Шевельов
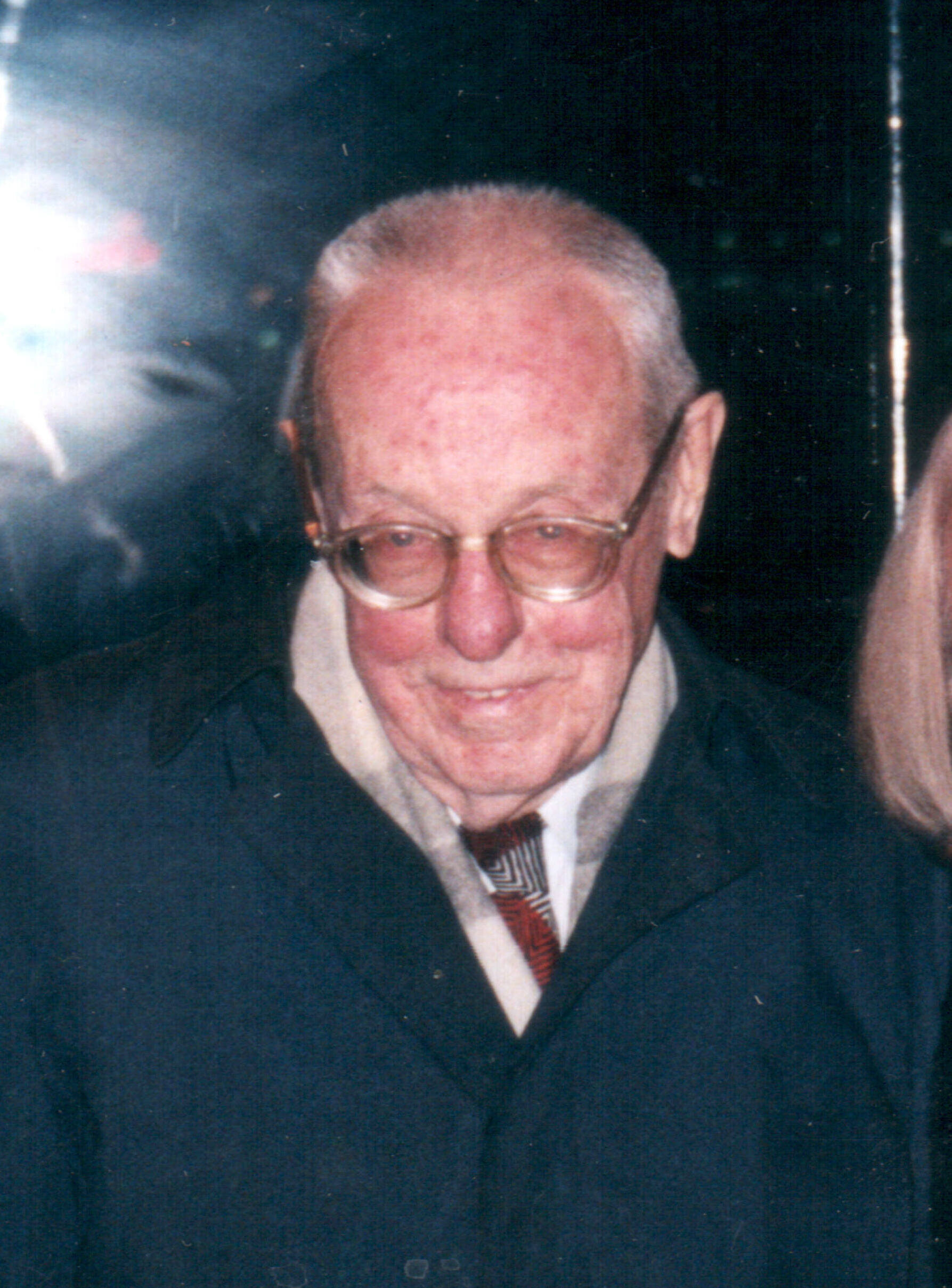
- Shevelov in 1998
- Born: Yuri Vladimirovich Schneider; 17 December 1908; Kharkov, Russian Empire
- Died: 12 April 2002 (aged 93)
- Other names: Yurii Sherekh, Hryhory Shevchuk, Šerech, Sherekh, Sher; Гр. Ш., Ю. Ш.
- Known for: Linguist & literary historian of Ukrainian language
- Scientific career
- Doctoral advisor: Leonid Bulakhovsky
- Notable students: Oles Honchar

George Yurii Shevelov (Note: Russian: Юрий Владимирович Шевелёв, romanized: Yuriy Vladimirovich Shevelyov Ukrainian: Юрій Володимирович Шевельов, romanized: Yuriy Volodymyrovych Shevelyov) (né Schneider, (Note: Russian: Юрий Владимирович Шнейдер, romanized: Yuriy Vladimirovich Shneyder) 17 December 1908 – 12 April 2002) was a Ukrainian-American professor, linguist, philologist, essayist, literary historian, and literary critic. A longtime professor of Slavic philology at Columbia University, he challenged the prevailing notion of a unified East Slavic language from which Ukrainian, Belarusian and Russian later developed, instead proposing that these languages emerged independently from one another.

== Biography ==
=== Early life ===
Yuri Schneider was born in Kharkov (now Kharkiv, Ukraine) in 1908. Some sources state his place of birth as Lomzha (now Łomża, Poland), although according to Shevelov, this is because his mother falsified records fearing persecution. His father, Vladimir Georgievich Shevelov (born Vladimir Karlovich Schneider) was a high ranking Russian Imperial Army officer who held the rank of major-general. His father and mother (Varvara Vladimirovna Meder, who originally was of noble birth from an established Moscow family) were both ethnic Germans. When Russia declared war on the German Empire in 1914, his father, a fervent Russian monarchist, decided to Russify the family name, choosing a random name with the same initial (Shevelov), and also changed the patronymic “Karlovich” to “Georgievich”. Such changes required a personal petition to the Tsar, and in his case it was personally granted by Nicholas II in 1916. During the World War I, Shevelov and his mother moved to Kharkov. At the beginning of 1918, Shevelov's father was missing in action and was presumed killed.

In Kharkiv, Shevelov initially attended the E. Druzhkova Private School, then the 3rd State Boy's Gymnasium, followed by Technical School #7 (Ukrainian: 7-а трудовa школa). Under the influence of his cousin Tolia Nosiv, who worked as an anthropologist at the Ukrainian Academy of Sciences and had been mentored by Fedir Vovk, Shevelov developed an interest in the Ukrainian language and history. During his youth he read the Illustrated history of Ukraine by Mykhailo Hrushevsky and translated a story by Edgar Allan Poe into Ukrainian. At the age of 17, before entering university, Shevelov travelled to Kyiv together with his cousin, meeting Hrushevsky and Serhiy Yefremov.

=== Career in Soviet Ukraine ===
In 1925 Shevelov graduated from the First Kharkov Trade and Industry Union School (Ukrainian: Перша харківська торговельна промислова профспілкова школа). From 1925 till 1927 he worked as a statistician and archive keeper for South Chemical Trust. In 1927–1931 he attended classes at the literary-linguistic branch of the Kharkiv People's Education Institute. He is considered a member of the Kharkiv Linguistic School. From August 1931 he was employed as a Ukrainian language school teacher. From 1932 till 1938 he was employed as a Ukrainian language teacher at the Ukrainian Communist Newspaper Technical School (Ukrainian: Український комуністичний газетний технікум). From 1933 till 1939 he also taught Ukrainian language at the Ukrainian Communist Institute for Journalism. From September 1936 he was a postgraduate student under the guidance of Leonid Bulakhovsky. In 1939, he taught the history of the Ukrainian language and literature. From November 1939 he became the assistant professor and deputy chair of the philology department of the Kharkiv Pedagogical Institute. In 1941 he became a research fellow at the Linguistic Institute of the Academy of Science of the Ukrainian SSR. In that same year he was pressured to become an NKVD informer.

In 1934, Shevelov was the co-author of a grammar of the Ukrainian language in two volumes. This text was reprinted in 1935 and 1936.

=== World War II ===
Shevelov was able to avoid induction into the Red Army and remained in Kharkiv following the Soviet evacuation and during the entry of Wehrmacht troops into Kharkiv on 25 October 1941. Within Reichskommissariat Ukraine, he joined the “New Ukraine” in December 1941, a Ukrainian language newspaper partially controlled by OUN. Later Shevelov also worked at the "Ukrainian Sowing" newspaper (Ukrainian: «Український засів»). From April 1942 Shevelov worked for the city administration and collaborated with the educational organization Prosvita. In his memoirs, one of his former students Oles Honchar claimed that when as a Soviet POW he was detained in a Nazi Camp in Kharkiv, Shevelov refused his pleas for assistance. Shevelov answered the allegation in an interview stating that he never received the letter "...And then we had another face-to-face meeting. Honchar started attacking me - ideologically, recalling some facts that I knew nothing about. As though when he was imprisoned in Kharkiv during the war, he gave me a letter in which he asked me to help free him, and I could have, but I didn't want to. Perhaps there really was such a letter, but it never reached me.". Honchar escaped death to become a renowned and influential Ukrainian writer. Shevelov was critical of Soviet novels including Honchar's major work.

Shevelov and his mother fled the returning Red Army's advance on Kharkiv in February 1943. He lived for a brief period in Lviv, within the General Government, where he continued to study the Ukrainian language, including the creation of a new Ukrainian grammar until the spring of 1944, when the Soviets continued their drive westwards. Shevelov with the assistance of the Ukrainian Central Committee moved to Poland (Krynica) and then to Slovakia, Austria and finally Saxony.

=== Emigration ===
After the fall of Nazi Germany, Shevelov worked for the Ukrainian émigré newspaper “Chas” (“Time”). In 1946 he enrolled in the Ukrainian Free University in Munich and defended his doctorate dissertation in philology in 1947, continuing on his pre-war research and work "До генези називного речення" (1941). He was also vice-president of the MUR (Ukrainian: Мистецький український рух), a Ukrainian literary association (1945–49). In order to avoid repatriation to Soviet Union from Germany, he moved to neutral Sweden, where he worked in 1950–52 as Russian language lecturer at Lund University.

In 1952, together with mother, he emigrated to the US. After settling there he worked as a lecturer in Russian and Ukrainian at Harvard University (1952-4), associate professor (1954-8) and professor of Slavic philology at Columbia University (1958–77). He was one of the founders and president of the émigré scholarly organization the Ukrainian Free Academy of Sciences (1959–61, 1981–86) and received an honorary doctorate from the University of Alberta (1983) and Lund University (1984). He was a founding member of the Slovo Association of Ukrainian Writers in Exile and was published in numerous émigré bulletins and magazines.

=== Return to Ukraine ===
Shevelov was almost unknown to Ukrainian academic circles after 1943. In 1990, after an extended absence, he visited Ukraine where he was elected an international member of the National Academy of Sciences of Ukraine. In 1999 he received an honorary doctorate from the Kharkiv University and from the National University of Kyiv-Mohyla Academy.

He granted his home library collection to the University of Hokkaido, Japan in 1997.

In 2001 he published two volumes of his memoirs “Я – мене – мені…(і довкруги).”: Спогади.

He died in 2002 in New York.

== Awards ==
- Antonovych prize (1988)

== Intellectual contributions ==
=== Linguistic history ===
Shevelov prepared and published more than 600 scholarly texts concerning different aspects of the philology of the Ukrainian and other Slavic languages. From 1943 he developed the concept of the distinct establishment and development of Ukrainian and, later, Belarusian languages. Shevelov argued against the commonly held view of an original, unified East Slavic language from which Ukrainian, Belarusian and Russian languages diverged and instead proposed the existence of several dialectical groups (Kyivan-Polissyan, Galician-Podillian, Polotsk-Smolensk, Novgorodian-Tversk, Murom-Ryazansk) that had been distinct from the beginning and which later formed into separate Ukrainian, Russian and Belarusian languages. According to Shevelov, the beginnings of a separate Ukrainian language could be traced to the 7th century while the language formed in approximately the 16th century

=== Russian–Ukrainian cultural relations ===
In his 1954 article Moscow, Maroseyka (Ukrainian: Москва, Маросєйка), dedicated to the 300th anniversary of the Treaty of Pereyaslav, Shevelov analyzed the history of Ukrainian-Russian cultural relations, which, according to him, were based upon an existential conflict between the two cultures. In his view, the Ukrainian national revival had three main historical enemies: Moscow, "Ukrainian provincialism" and the "Kochubey complex". According to Shevelov, Ukrainian intelligentsia failed in its plan to perform a "cultural conquest" of Moscow, which had been first developed in the late 16th century, but instead contributed to the emergence of a number of historical myths, such as the existence of "Little" and "Great Russia" and direct inheritance between Moscow and medieval Kyiv. He blames this failure on the excessive use of universalist concepts, which was later repeated by the Romanticism-inspired Brotherhood of Saints Cyril and Methodius and by Ukrainian National Communists. According to Shevelov, Ukrainians' perceived cultural superiority over Russia couldn't be realized due to the fact, that Ukraine itself remained a mere province of the bigger state.

== Commemoration ==
On 4 September 2013 memorial plaque to Shevelov in his native Kharkiv was unveiled. On 25 September 2013 the Kharkiv City Council, after an appeal by the Anti-Fascist Committee of Kharkiv, voted with 65 deputies for and four against (all four of whom were members of Batkivshchyna) that the memorial plaque to Shevelov in Kharkiv was placed there illegally. According to Mayor Hennadiy Kernes Shevelov "proved to be a Nazi henchman". Kharkiv Oblast Governor Mykhailo Dobkin suggested that Shevelov during World War II "took an apartment of a Jewish family which, most likely, was shot". In an open letter addressed the Kharkiv city council scientists from the University of Cambridge, Columbia University, the University of Kansas, Rutgers University, Northwestern University and the University of Alberta had pleaded that the allegations that Shevelov was a Nazi collaborator "were thoroughly investigated by numerous US government agencies and Columbia University who completely and unequivocally rejected these acquisitions". Half an hour after the Kharkiv city council had established that the memorial plaque to Shevelov was illegal (citizens who identified themselves as) public employees destroyed the memorial plaque. On 5 January 2015 the Kharkiv Administrative Court of Appeal reversed the decision of the Kharkiv city council to dismantle the memorial plaque for Shevelov. In 2021 the memorial plaque was reinstated after a public fundraiser.

== Select bibliography ==
- Головні правила українського правопису (Neu-Ulm, 1946),
- До генези називного речення (Munich, 1947),
- Галичина в формуванні нової української літературної мови (Munich, 1949),
- Сучасна українська літературна мова (Munich, 1949),
- Нарис сучасної української літературної мови (Munich, 1951),
- Всеволод Ганцов – Олена Курило (Winnipeg, 1954),
- A Reader in the Hіstory of the Eastern Slavіc (New-York 1958, співав.),
- The Syntax of Modern Lіterary Ukrainian (1963),
- Не для дітей. Літературно-критичні статті і есеї (New-York, 1964),
- A Prehіstory of Slavіc: The Historical Phonology of Common Slavіc (1964, Heidelberg; 1965, New-York),
- Die ukrainіsche Schrіftsprache 1798–1965 (Wiesbaden, 1966),
- Teasers and Appeasers (1971),
- Друга черга: Література. Театр. Ідеології (1978),
- A Historical Phonology of the Ukrainian Language (1979» «Історична фонологія української мови», перекл. укр., 2002),
- Українська мова в першій половині двадцятого століття(1900–1941): Стан і статус (1987) and many other.
- «Історична фонологія української мови». пер. Сергія Вакуленка та Андрія Даниленка. Харків: Акта, 2002.
