= Nowa Karczma, Krynica Morska =

Nowa Karczma
- Neighborhood of Krynica Morska
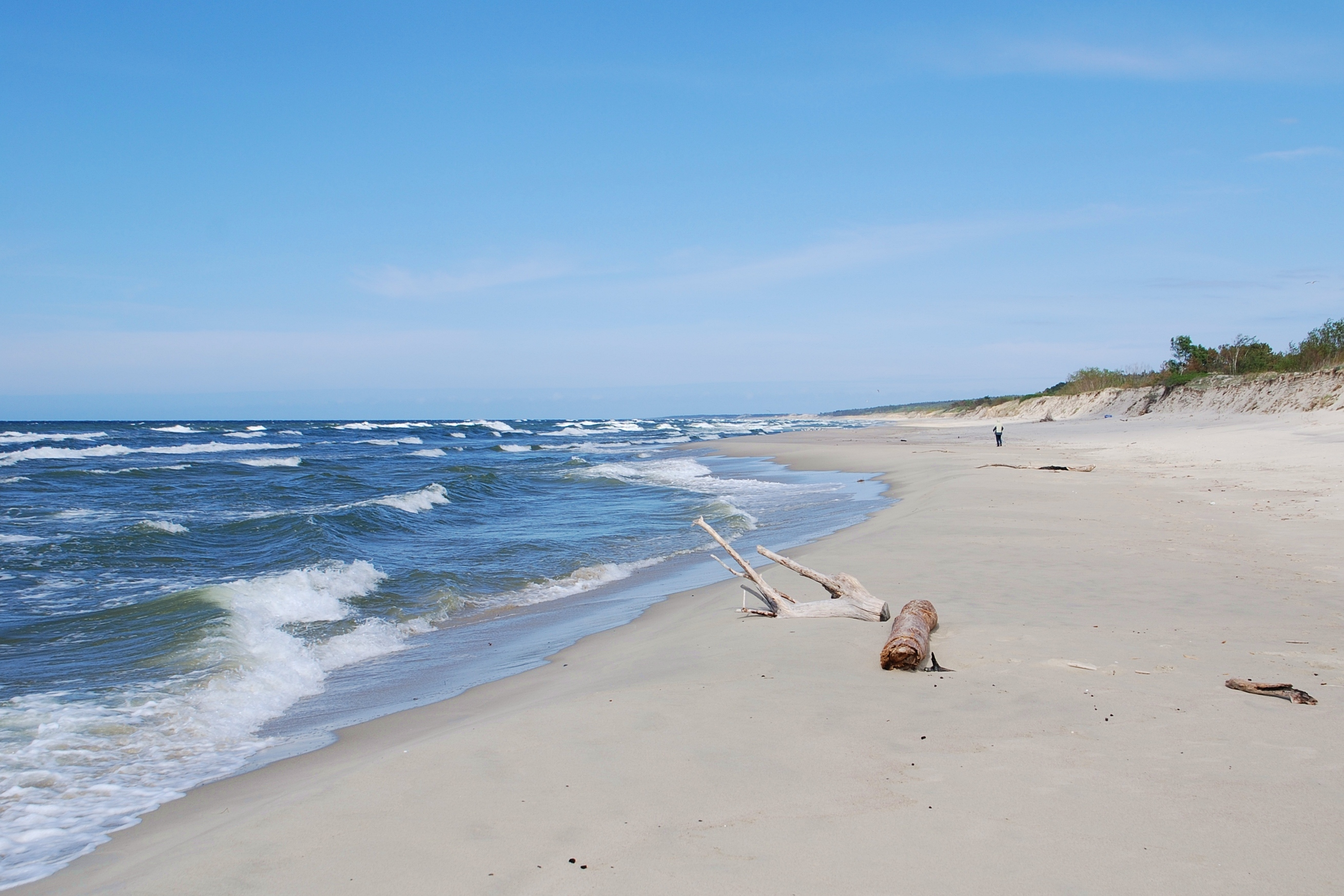
- Beach in Nowa Karczma
- Interactive map of Nowa Karczma
- Coordinates: 54.431°N 19.601°E
- Country: Poland
- Voivodeship: Pomeranian
- County: Nowy Dwór
- Gmina/Town: Krynica Morska
- Within town limits: 1991
- Time zone: UTC+1 (CET)
  - Summer (DST): UTC+2 (CEST)
- Vehicle registration: GND

Nowa Karczma (also colloquially known as Piaski) is a neighborhood of Krynica Morska on the Vistula Spit in northern Poland, located in the eastern part of the town.

== History ==
Previously a separate village, it was part of the Kingdom of Poland until the Second Partition of Poland in 1793, when it was annexed by Prussia. In 1871 it became part of Germany. Following Germany's defeat in World War II, in 1945, the village was reintegrated with Poland.

It was included within town limits of Krynica Morska in 1991. Until then it was a village administratively located in Gmina Sztutowo.

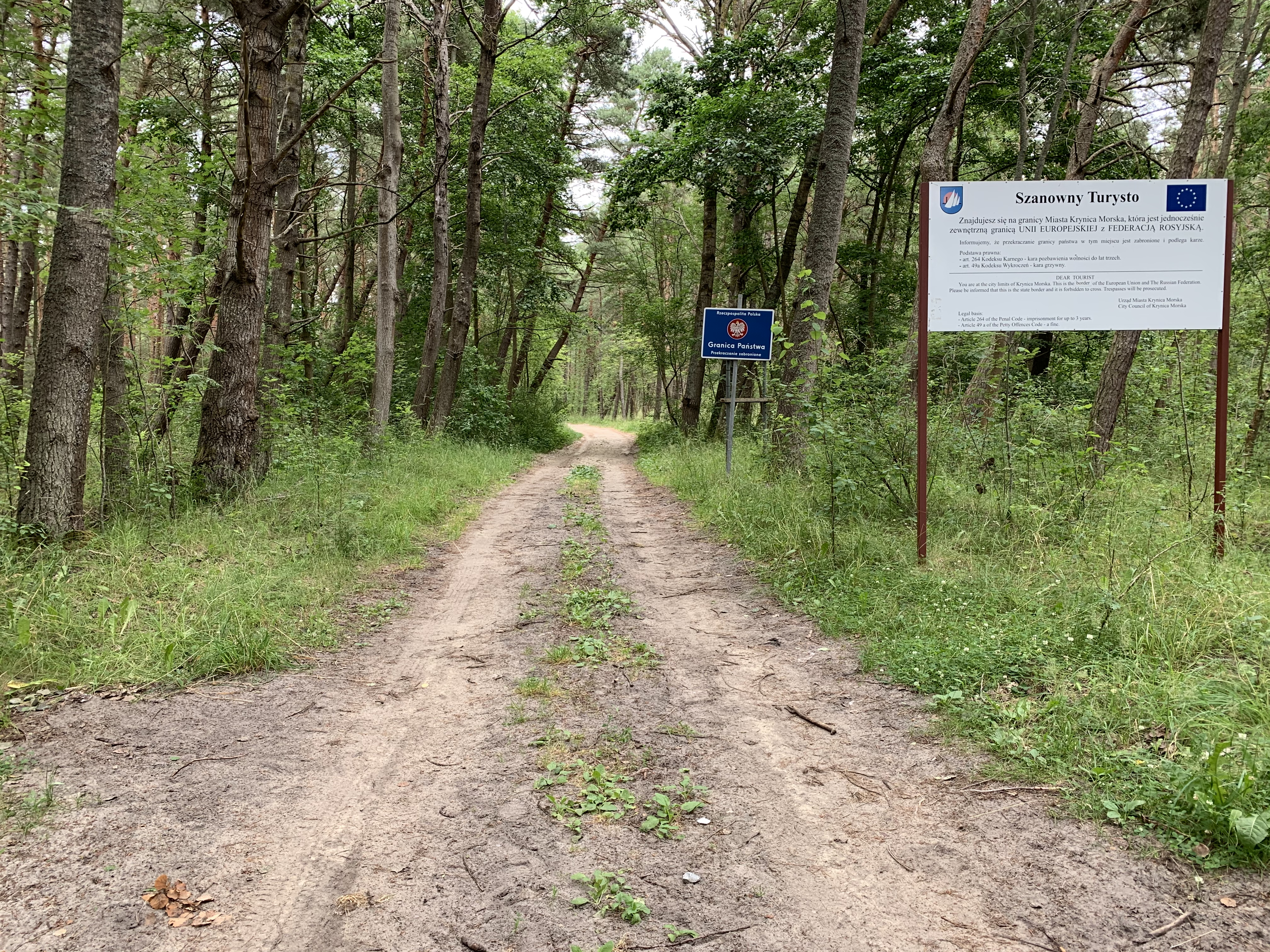
Poland-Russia border in Nowa Karczma
