= Przebrno =

- Neighborhood of Krynica Morska
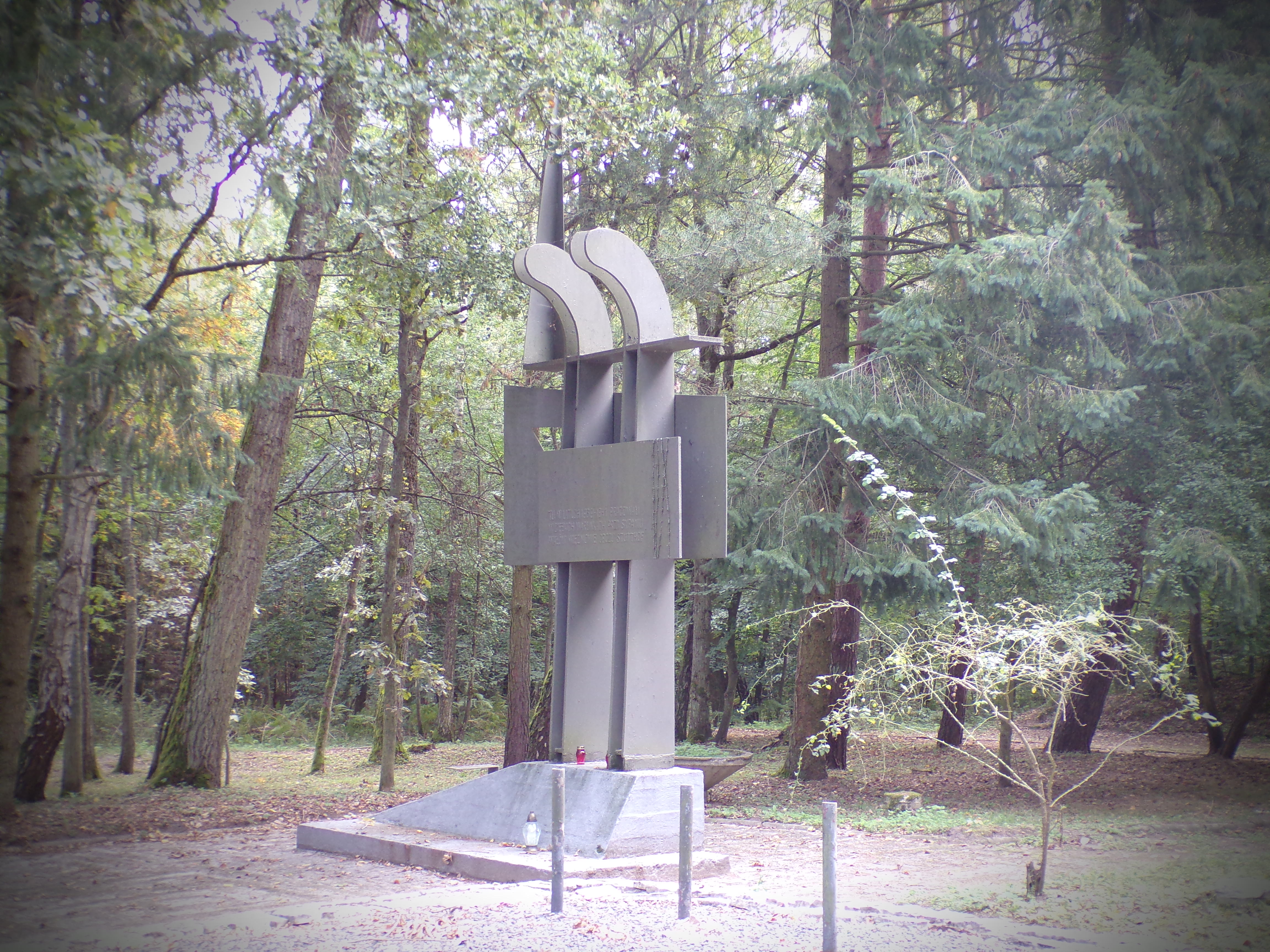
- Monument to the victims of the former Nazi German subcamp of Stutthof
- Interactive map of Przebrno
- Coordinates: 54°22′N 19°22′E
- Country: Poland
- Voivodeship: Pomeranian
- County: Nowy Dwór
- Gmina/Town: Krynica Morska
- Within town limits: 1991
- Time zone: UTC+1 (CET)
  - Summer (DST): UTC+2 (CEST)
- Vehicle registration: GND

Przebrno (German: Pröbbernau) is a neighborhood of the town of Krynica Morska on the Vistula Spit in northern Poland, located in the western part of the town.

The village has sandy beaches on the shores of the Bay of Gdańsk on the northern side of the spit, and the Vistula Lagoon on the southern side.

== History ==
Previously a separate village, it was a possession of the city of Gdańsk, located in the Pomeranian Voivodeship in the Kingdom of Poland until the Second Partition of Poland in 1793, when it was annexed by Prussia. In 1871 it became part of Germany. During World War II, in 1939–1941, it was the location of a subcamp of the Stutthof concentration camp, in which the Germans imprisoned 200 people as forced labour at a time. Following Germany's defeat in World War II, in 1945, the village was reintegrated with Poland.

It was included within town limits of Krynica Morska in 1991. Until then it was a village administratively located in Gmina Sztutowo.

The Vistula Spit canal passes near Przebrno.
