= Płonina =

Płonina may refer to the following places in Poland:

- Płonina, Lower Silesian Voivodeship (south-west Poland)
- Płonina, Pomeranian Voivodeship (north Poland)
