= Grochowo Drugie =

- Village
- Location within Poland
- Coordinates: 54°18′36″N 19°9′37″E
- Country: Poland
- Voivodeship: Pomeranian
- County: Nowy Dwór
- Gmina: Sztutowo

Grochowo Drugie [ɡrɔˈxɔvɔ ˈdruɡʲɛ] is a village in the administrative district of Gmina Sztutowo, within Nowy Dwór County, Pomeranian Voivodeship, in northern Poland.
