= Przyłap =

- Settlement
- Location within Poland
- Coordinates: 54°19′27″N 19°14′34″E
- Country: Poland
- Voivodeship: Pomeranian
- County: Nowy Dwór
- Gmina: Sztutowo

Przyłap [ˈpʂɨwap] is a settlement in the administrative district of Gmina Sztutowo, within Nowy Dwór County, Pomeranian Voivodeship, in northern Poland.
