= Grochowo Trzecie =

- Village
- Location within Poland
- Coordinates: 54°18′15″N 19°12′23″E
- Country: Poland
- Voivodeship: Pomeranian
- County: Nowy Dwór
- Gmina: Sztutowo

Grochowo Trzecie [ɡrɔˈxɔvɔ ˈtʂɛt͡ɕɛ] is a village in the administrative district of Gmina Sztutowo, within Nowy Dwór County, Pomeranian Voivodeship, in northern Poland.

Before 1772 the area was part of Kingdom of Poland, 1772-1919 Prussia and Germany, 1920-1939 Free City of Danzig, 1939 - February 1945 Nazi Germany. For the history of the region, see History of Pomerania.
