= Wydmina =

- Settlement
- Location within Poland
- Coordinates: 54°18′58″N 19°14′14″E
- Country: Poland
- Voivodeship: Pomeranian
- County: Nowy Dwór
- Gmina: Sztutowo

Wydmina [vɨdˈmina] is a settlement in the administrative district of Gmina Sztutowo, within Nowy Dwór County, Pomeranian Voivodeship, in northern Poland.

For the history of the region, see History of Pomerania.
