= Sztutowo =

- Village
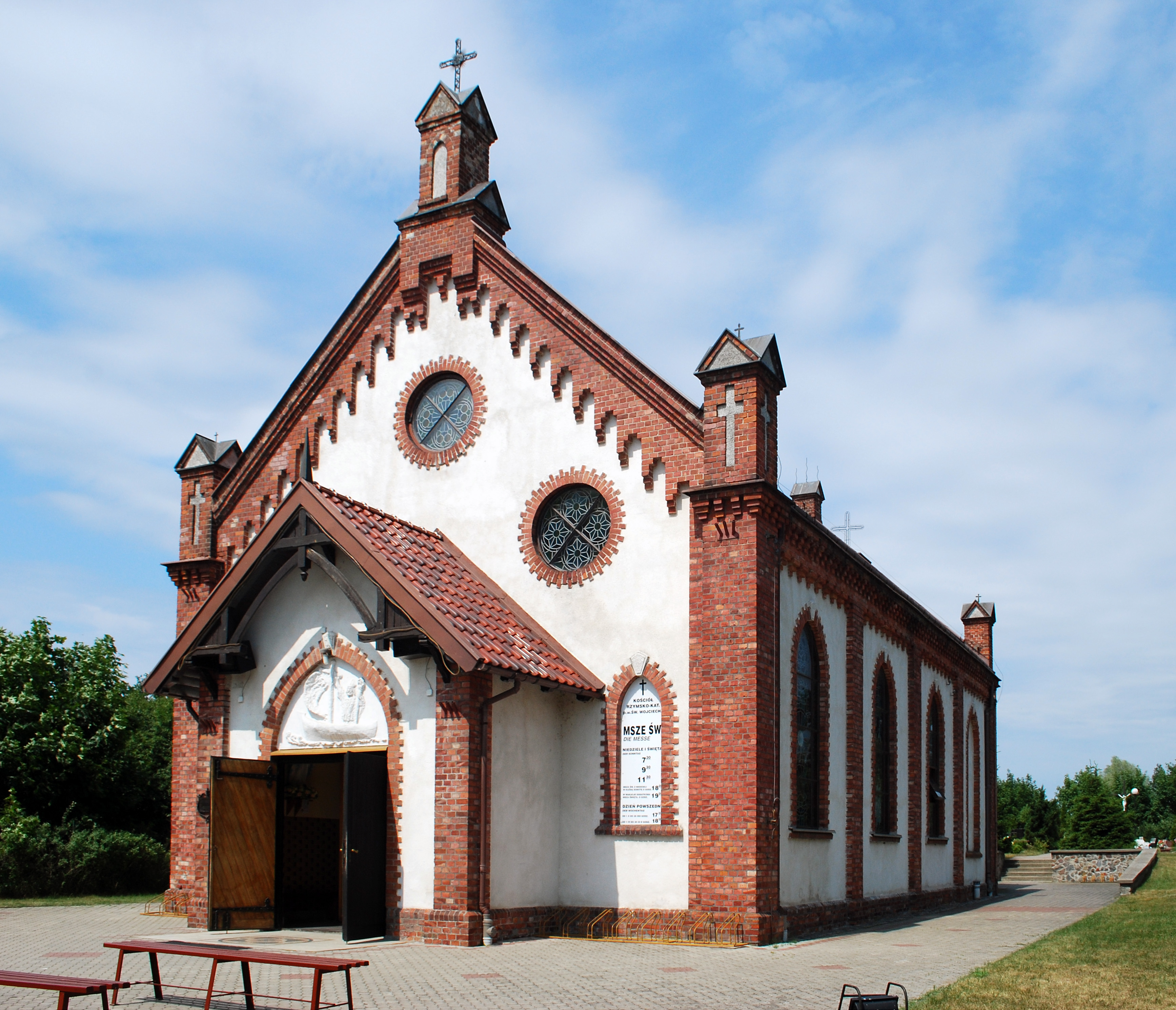
- Church of Saint Adalbert in Sztutowo

- Coat of arms

- Location within Poland
- Coordinates: 54°19′N 19°11′E
- Country: Poland
- Voivodeship: Pomeranian
- County: Nowy Dwór
- Gmina: Sztutowo

Government
  - Mayor: Janusz Charliński
- Population (2006): 2,988
- Time zone: UTC+1 (CET)
  - Summer (DST): UTC+2 (CEST)
- Postal code: 82-110
- Area code: +48 55
- Car Plates: GND
- Climate: Cfb

Sztutowo pronounced [ʂtuˈtɔvɔ] (German: Stutthof) is a village in Nowy Dwór County, within the Pomeranian Voivodeship of northern Poland.

At the beginning of World War II, Nazi Germany established the Stutthof concentration camp in the village, which soon developed into a huge complex of 40 subcamps across numerous locations, with as many as 100,000 people incarcerated there from all of German-occupied Europe, and more than 85,000 victims.

== Etymology ==
The original name Stutthof is derived from the German word Stutt, meaning "stud farm", which existed in the village from the end of the 14th century until 1660. The Polonised name Sztutowo, in use since 12 November 1946, is a replacement for the German name with the addition of a Polish suffix.

== History ==
The village has been known since the beginning of the 13th century as a fishing settlement in the historical region of Pomerelia. The area was transferred to the State of the Teutonic Order by the Pomeranian Duke Swantopolk II on the basis of the Peace of 1248/49. It was located on a day's journey from Gdańsk (Danzig) on the Hanseatic post road to Königsberg. A coaching inn and stud farm were founded in 1432 to provide refreshment and fresh horses for the coaches, and the settlement developed into a village.

In 1454, Polish King Casimir IV Jagiellon signed the act of reincorporation of the region to the Crown of the Kingdom of Poland, and as a result the Thirteen Years' War broke out. It ended with the Second Peace of Thorn in 1466, when the Teutonic Knights renounced any claims to the region, and recognized it as a possession of the Polish Crown. Afterwards, the village was a possession of the city of Danzig, administratively located in the Pomeranian Voivodeship in the autonomous province of Royal Prussia (from 1569 in the larger Greater Poland Province of the Kingdom of Poland). At that time an estate and manor were founded in Stutthof, and an agrarian settlement developed nearby. It is recorded that Tsar Peter the Great of Russia stayed in Stutthof in 1716. The village was annexed by King Frederick the Great of Prussia in 1772 during the First Partition of Poland. A later lessee of the manor was the father of the German pessimist philosopher, Arthur Schopenhauer, who spent the first five years of his life there (born 1788 in Danzig).

Stutthof became part of the German Empire upon the Prussian-led unification of Germany in 1871. After the defeat of Imperial Germany in World War I, the village became part of the territory of the Free City of Danzig in accordance with the terms of the 1919 Treaty of Versailles.

=== World War II ===
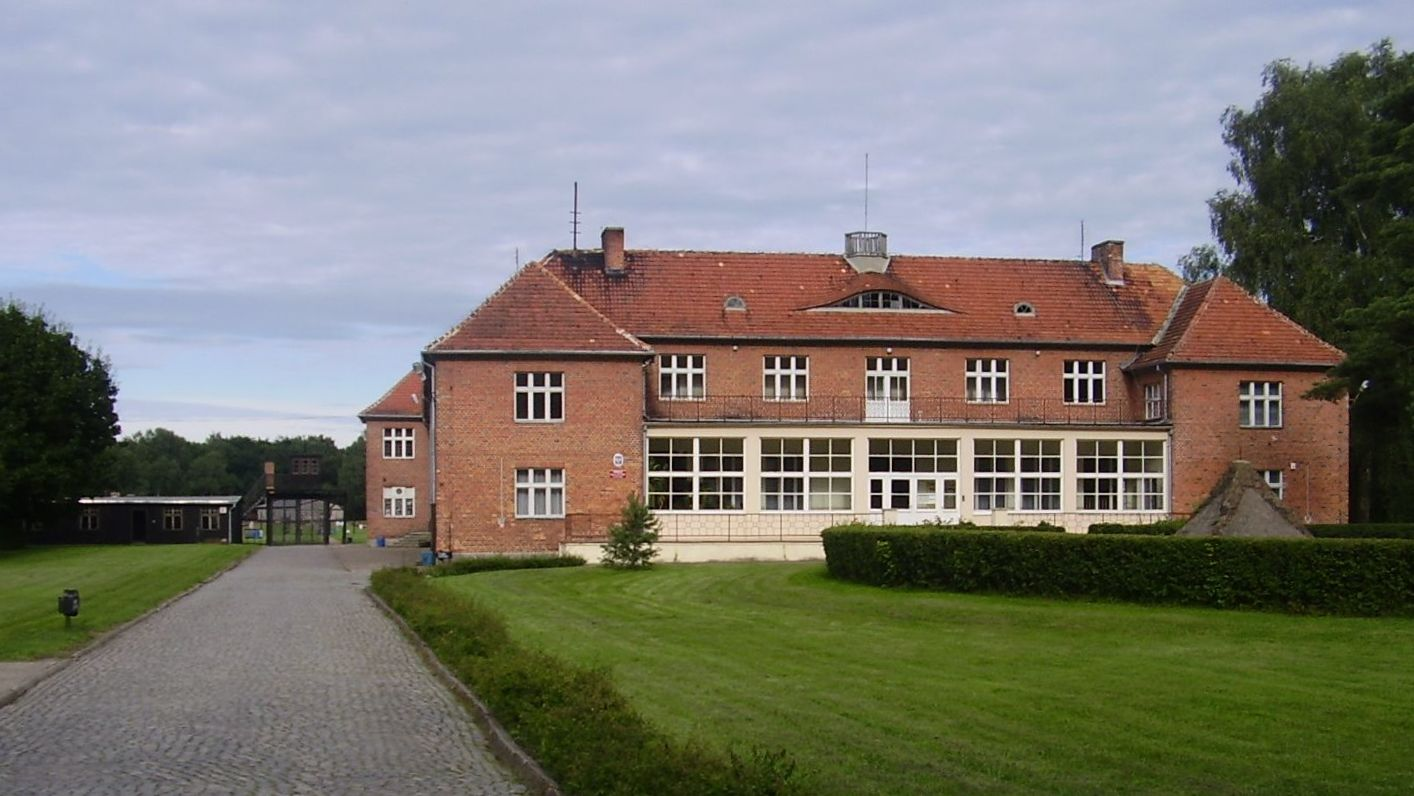
Stutthof concentration camp museum

At the beginning of World War II in 1939, the Nazis built the Stutthof concentration camp nearby, which received its first prisoners on 2 September that year. The village was annexed to Nazi Germany. The camp eventually developed into a huge complex with branches throughout northern Poland by the time it was liberated in May 1945 by the Red Army. More than 110,000 persons of twenty-five nationalities from nineteen countries were imprisoned, and it is estimated that more than 85,000 of them perished here. After the war, the village was reintegrated with Poland. The German population fled or was expelled and the village was resettled with Poles. In November 1946 the Polonised name Sztutowo was introduced. The site of the former Stutthof camp, located to the west of the current village, is now a Polish national museum.

== Economy ==
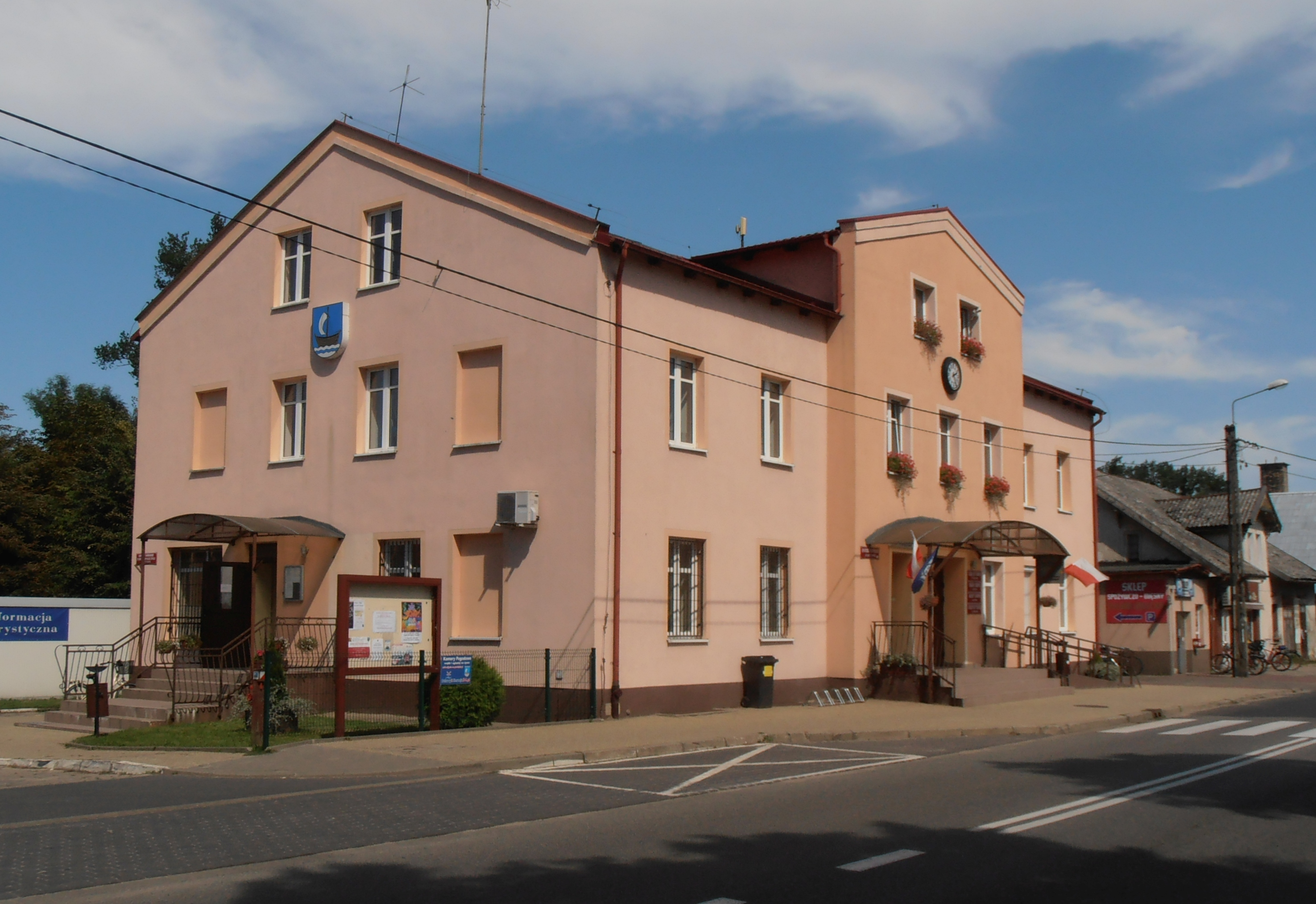
Gmina office in Sztutowo

Sztutowo is an agricultural, fishing, and tourist center, with numerous guest houses, spas, campgrounds, and recreational facilities. It has numerous seaside activities and a close proximity to a Polish national nature preserve and bird sanctuary.

== Sports ==
Hemako Sztutowo professional beach soccer team is based in Sztutowo.
