= Groszkowo, Pomeranian Voivodeship =

Groszkowo
- Village
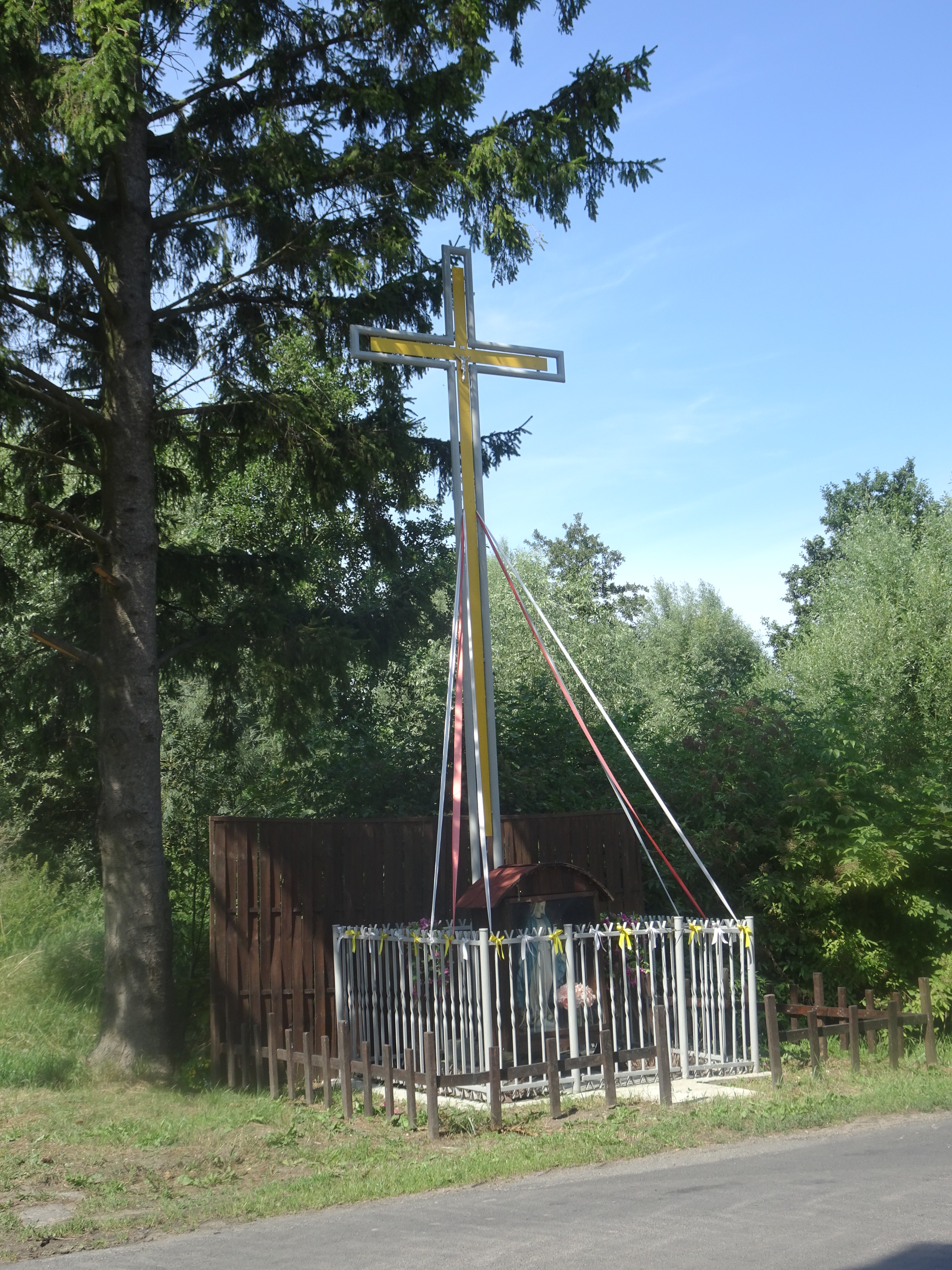

- Location within Poland
- Coordinates: 54°17′27″N 19°11′47″E
- Country: Poland
- Voivodeship: Pomeranian
- County: Nowy Dwór
- Gmina: Sztutowo
- Population: 150

Groszkowo [ɡrɔʂˈkɔvɔ] is a village in the administrative district of Gmina Sztutowo, within Nowy Dwór County, Pomeranian Voivodeship, in northern Poland.

Before 1772 the area was part of Kingdom of Poland, 1772-1919 Prussia and Germany, 1920-1939 Free City of Danzig, September 1939 - February 1945 Nazi Germany. For the history of the region, see History of Pomerania.
