= Vistula Spit =

Peninsular stretch of land in the Baltic Sea on the border between Russia and Poland

Vistula Spit: Mierzeja Wiślana (Polish); Балтийская коса (Russian)
- Spit
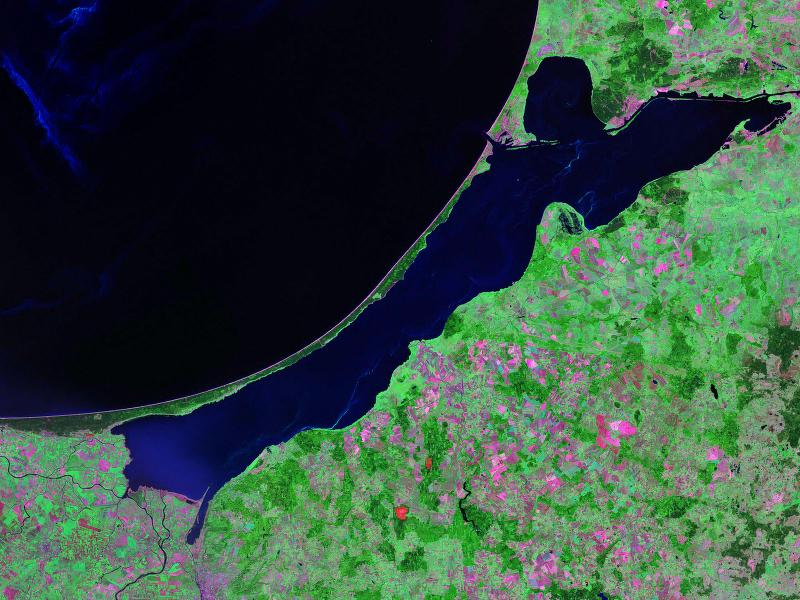
- Landsat photo of the Vistula Spit

- Location within Europe Location within Poland Location within European Russia Location within Baltic Sea
- Coordinates: 54°24′N 19°30′E
- Location: Pomeranian Voivodeship, Poland; Kaliningrad Oblast, Russia
- Water bodies: Gdańsk Bay; Vistula Lagoon

Dimensions
  - Length: 70 km (43 mi)
- Largest town: Krynica Morska

The Vistula Spit (Note: (Polish: Mierzeja Wiślana; Russian: Балтийская коса, romanized: Baltiyskaya kosa; German: Danziger Nehrung, Frische Nehrung; Low German: Dantzker Nearing)) is an aeolian sand spit, or peninsular stretch of land, separating Vistula Lagoon from Gdańsk Bay, in the Baltic Sea, with its tip separated from the mainland by the Strait of Baltiysk. The border between Poland (Pomeranian Voivodeship) and Kaliningrad Oblast, an exclave of Russia, bisects it, politically dividing the spit into two pieces between the two countries. The westernmost geographical point of Russia is located on the Vistula Spit. The Polish part contains a number of tourist resorts, incorporated administratively as the town of Krynica Morska.

== Geography ==
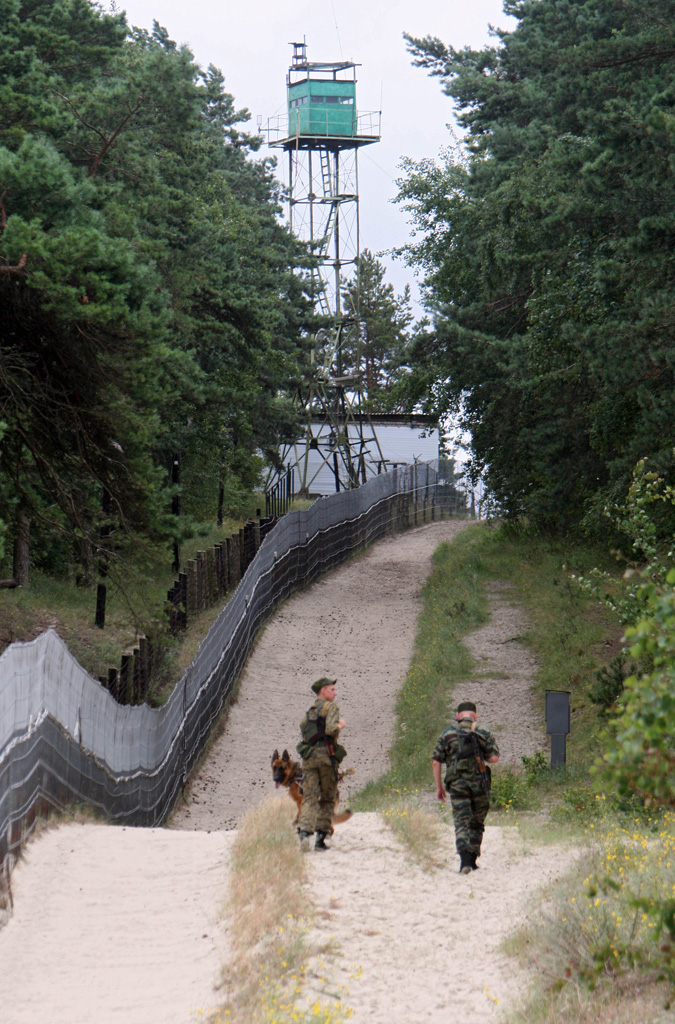
Russian guards at the Poland-Russia border on the Vistula Spit

Situated in the Gdańsk Bay this narrow headland (spit) is on average only few hundred metres wide (widest point is 1.8 km (1.1 mi)) and with the total length of 70 km (43 mi) twice as long as the better known and more populous Hel Peninsula in the western part of the Gdańsk Bay. The Vistula Spit stretches in a north-easterly direction and separates the Vistula Lagoon from the southern Baltic Sea. It is separated from the Sambia Peninsula by the Strait of Baltiysk. The spit consists of 10 to 12 m (33 to 39 ft) high marine sand, accumulated during three dune generations. The highest peaks of the Vistula Spit are Wielbłądzi Grzbiet (49.5 m, 162 ft) on the Polish side of the peninsula and the smaller 25 m (82 ft) high shifting sand dune of Narmeln on the Russian side of the border.

The border between Poland (Pomeranian Voivodeship) and Russia (Kaliningrad Oblast) runs across the spit, with its south-western part in Poland and the north-eastern part in Russia. The Polish part includes, from west to east, the villages of Kąty Rybackie, Skowronki, and the town of Krynica Morska, the largest locality on the Polish side, and a popular tourist destination. Since 1991, Krynica Morska includes in its municipal borders formerly separate villages of Przebrno and Nowa Karczma, the latter being the easternmost inhabited locality on the Polish side of the Spit.

The Russian part of the Vistula Spit is only inhabited in its northernmost part, which belongs to the port town of Baltiysk and lies on the southern side of the Strait of Baltiysk. The Russian airbase Noytif (originally built as a German Luftwaffe airbase Neu Tief) was located there.

== History ==
Until the 13th century, the spit had navigable straits in the middle, which allowed the city of Elbing (Elbląg), part of the monastic State of the Teutonic Knights, direct access to the Baltic Sea. The natural closing of the straits in the late 13th century reduced Elbing's status as an important trading seaport. This and the Teutonic takeover of Danzig (Gdańsk) and Polish Pomerania in 1308 led to the increased importance of Gdańsk. In 1454, King Casimir IV Jagiellon re-incorporated the region to the Kingdom of Poland upon the request of the anti-Teutonic Prussian Confederation. In 1466, the Teutonic Knights renounced any claims to the region and recognized it as part of Poland.

During World War II, Przebrno was the location of a subcamp of the Stutthof concentration camp, in which the Germans imprisoned 200 people as forced labour at a time. There is a monument to the victims at the site. In the final stages of the war, the spit became the last holdout of the remaining German soldiers in the province of East Prussia, although the Soviets simply bypassed the spit after the East Prussian Offensive was decisively concluded, training their sights on the more important goal of capturing Berlin. The last Wehrmacht soldiers laid down their arms after the German Instrument of Surrender was signed.

=== Kursenieki ===
Historically Vistula Spit was populated by Kursenieki people (also known as Kuršininkai), an Old Prussian tribe, related to modern day Latvians. This nearly extinct Baltic ethnic group once made Vistula Spit, coastal zone of the Sambia Peninsula, and the Curonian Spit their home. In 1649 the Kuršininkai zone of settlement still spanned all the way from Memel (Klaipėda) to Gdańsk encompassing a narrow littoral strip of territory best suitable for their lifestyle, cultural preferences and dominant economic activity (fishing). The majority of Kuršininkai were eventually assimilated by the Germans. Only on the Curonian Spit a few scattered rural settlements survive to the present day. The Kuršininkai were considered Latvians until after World War I when Latvia gained independence from the Russian Empire, a consideration based on linguistic arguments. This was also the rationale for Latvian claims over the Curonian Spit, Memel, and other territories of Prussia in the aftermath of the WWI. Those claims would later be dropped.

== Transport ==
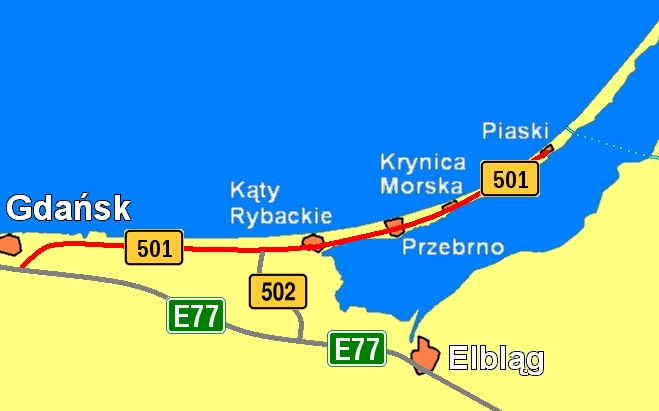
Map of Voivodeship road 501

The Polish side of the peninsula is accessible using Voivodeship road 501. There is at present no border crossing between Poland and Russia on the peninsula.

In 2019, the Polish government started the building of a ship canal across the peninsula, permitting ships to enter the Vistula Lagoon and the port of Elbląg, bypassing the transit route through the Russian Strait of Baltiysk. The Vistula Spit canal was opened in September 2022.

== See also ==
- Vistula Spit canal
- Language: Nehrungisch
- Curonian Spit
