= Krynica =

Krynica in certain Slavic languages means a well or spring. It may refer to the following places:

- Krynica-Zdrój, a town in Lesser Poland Voivodeship (south Poland)
- Krynica Morska, a coastal town in Pomeranian Voivodeship (north Poland)
- Krynica, Chełm County in Lublin Voivodeship (east Poland)
- Krynica, Białystok County in Podlaskie Voivodeship (northeast Poland)
- Krynica, Hajnówka County in Podlaskie Voivodeship (northeast Poland)
- Krynica, Mońki County in Podlaskie Voivodeship (northeast Poland)
- Krynica, Masovian Voivodeship (east-central Poland)
- Krynica, Sącz County, a city in Lesser Poland Voievodeship (south Poland)
