= Kąty Rybackie =

- Village
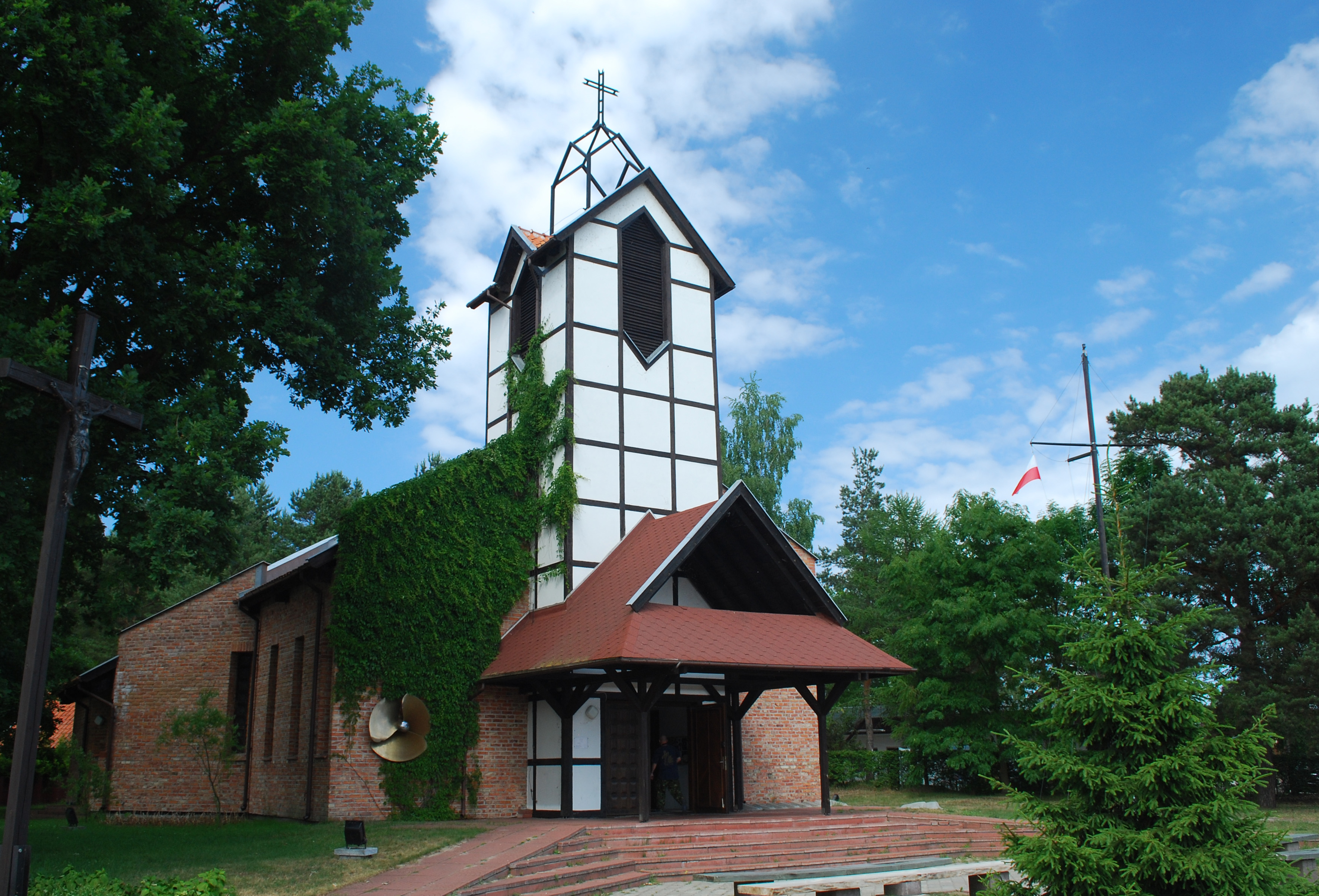
- Saint Mark Church

- Location within Poland
- Coordinates: 54°20′22″N 19°13′47″E
- Country: Poland
- Voivodeship: Pomeranian
- County: Nowy Dwór
- Gmina: Sztutowo
- Population: 712
- Time zone: UTC+1 (CET)
  - Summer (DST): UTC+2 (CEST)
- Vehicle registration: GND

Kąty Rybackie [ˈkɔntɨ rɨˈbat͡skʲɛ] (German : Bodenwinkel) is a village in the administrative district of Gmina Sztutowo, within Nowy Dwór County, Pomeranian Voivodeship, in northern Poland.

== History ==
The village was administratively part of the Pomeranian Voivodeship in the provinces of Royal Prussia and Greater Poland in the Kingdom of Poland until the Second Partition of Poland in 1793, when it was annexed by Prussia, and from 1871 to 1919 it was also part of Germany. From 1920 to 1939 it formed part of the Free City of Danzig (Gdańsk), and afterwards it was annexed by Nazi Germany at the start of World War II in 1939. It became again part of Poland following Germany's defeat in the war in 1945.

== Main sights ==
- Saint Mark Church
- Vistula Lagoon Museum
- Kąty Rybackie nature reserve

== Gallery ==
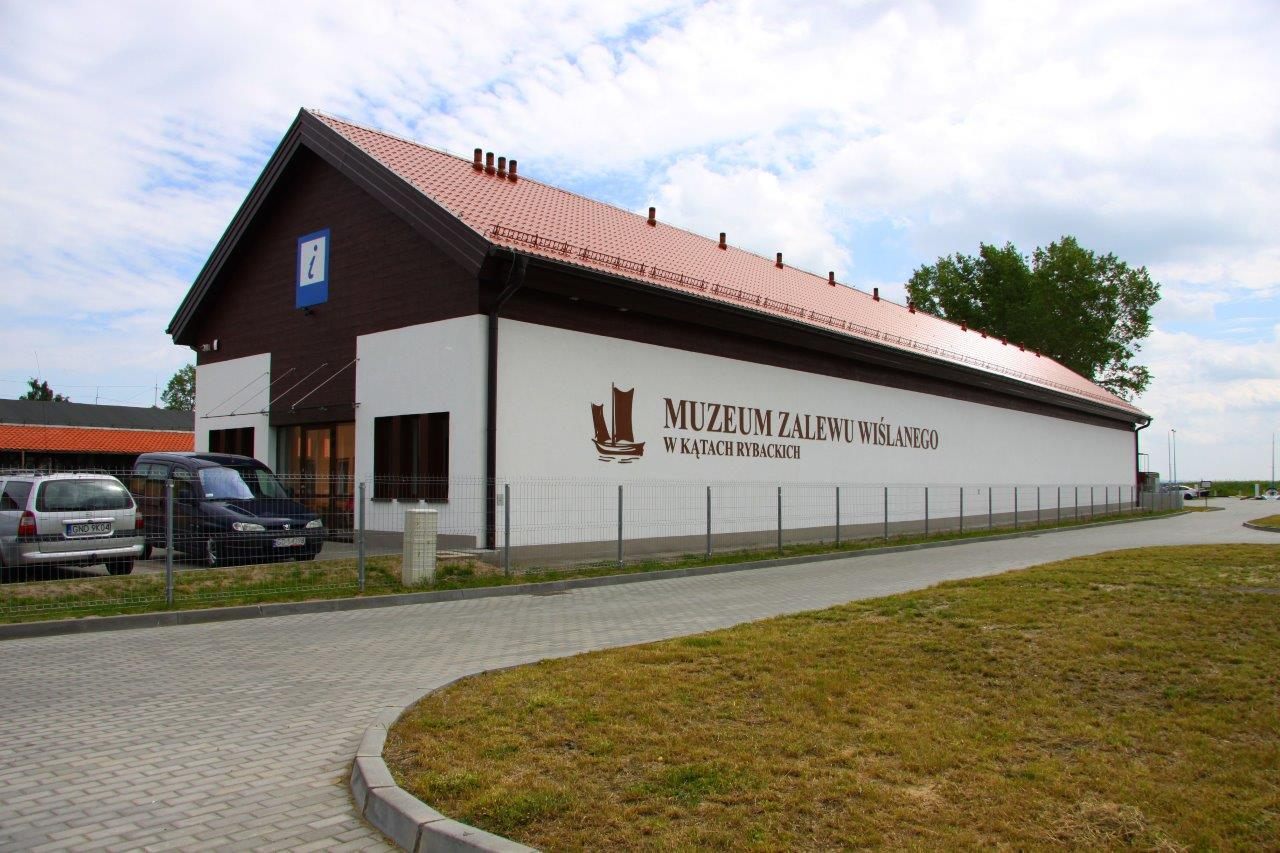
Vistula Lagoon Museum

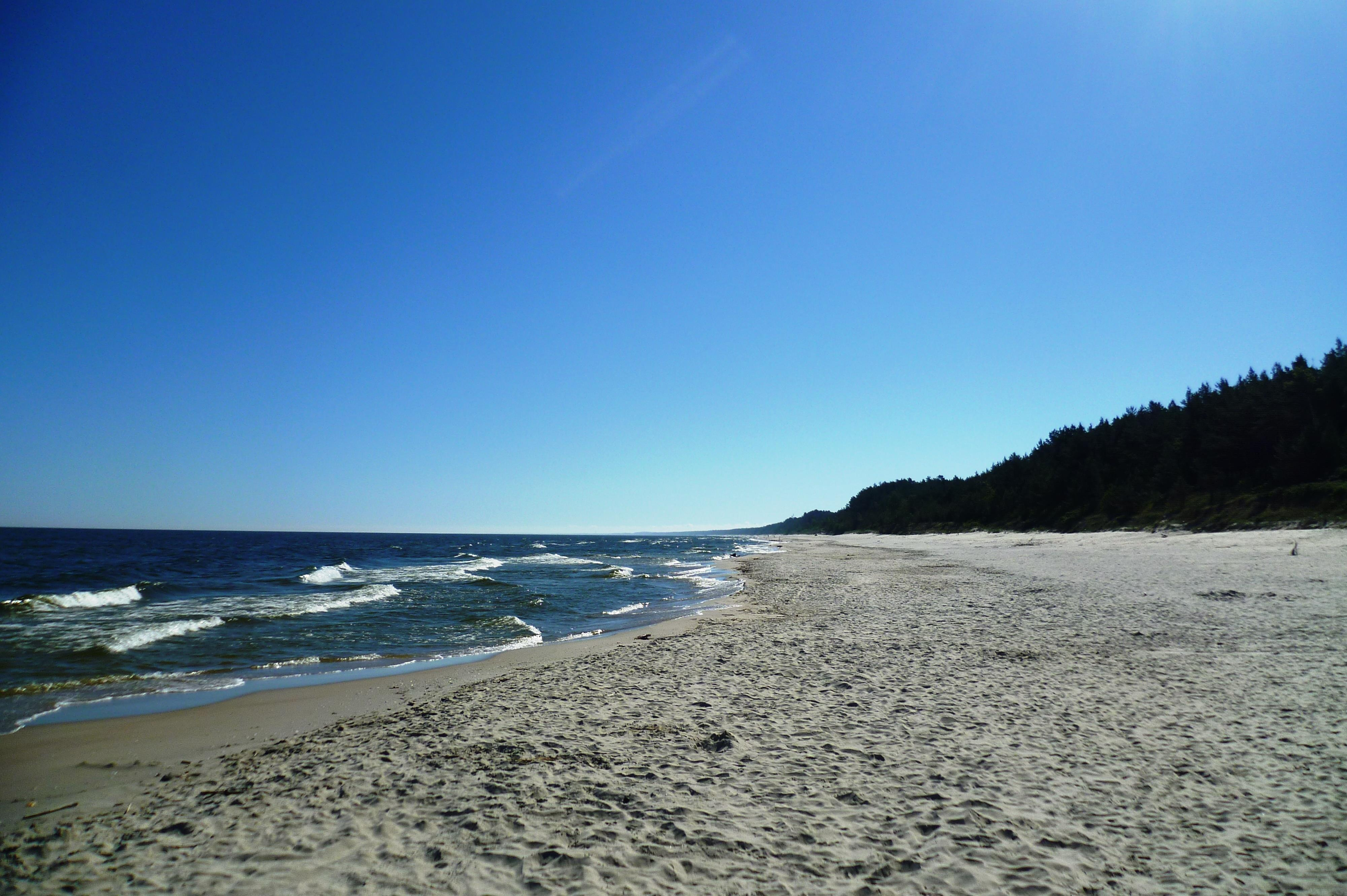
Beach

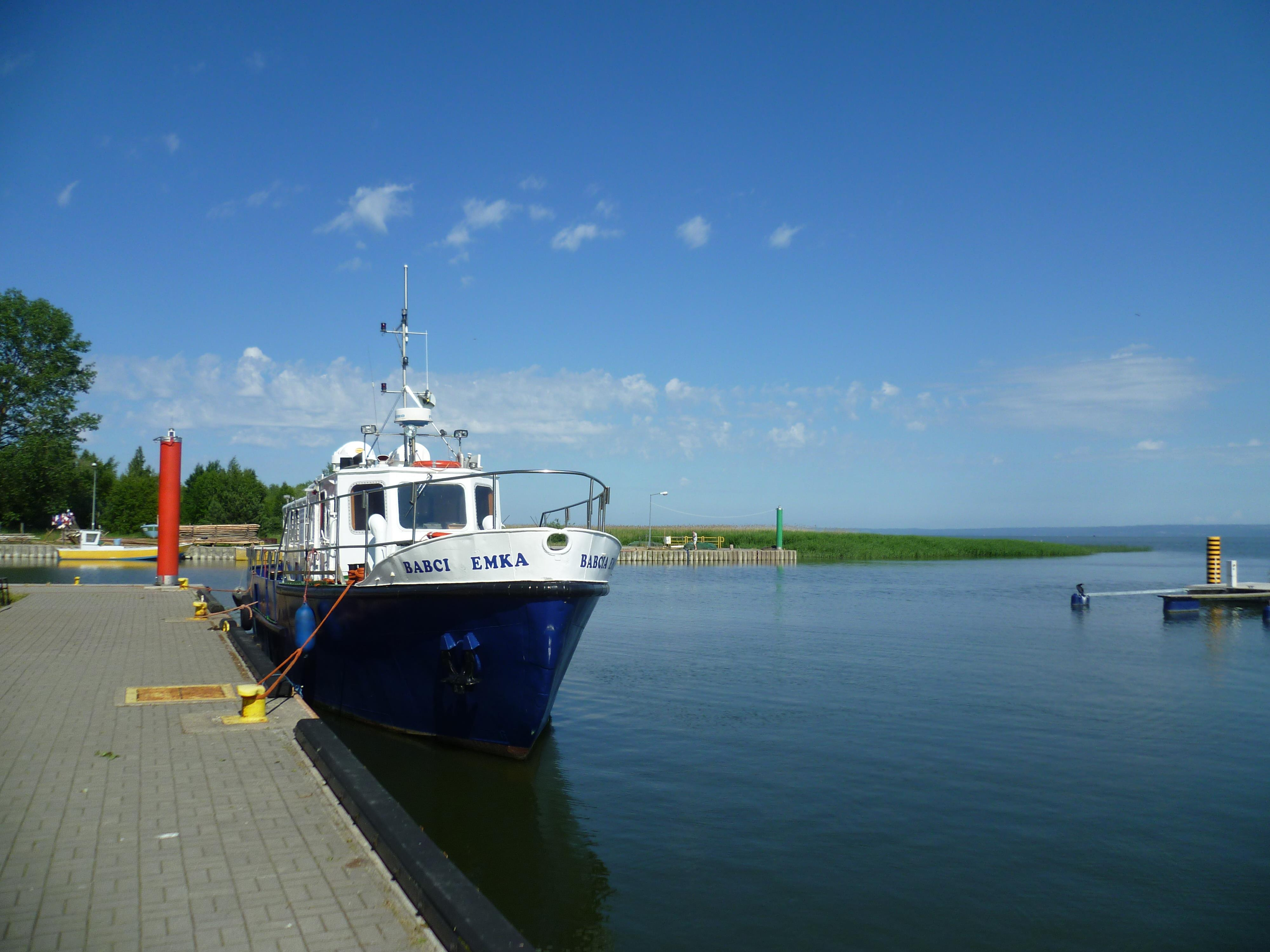
Harbour

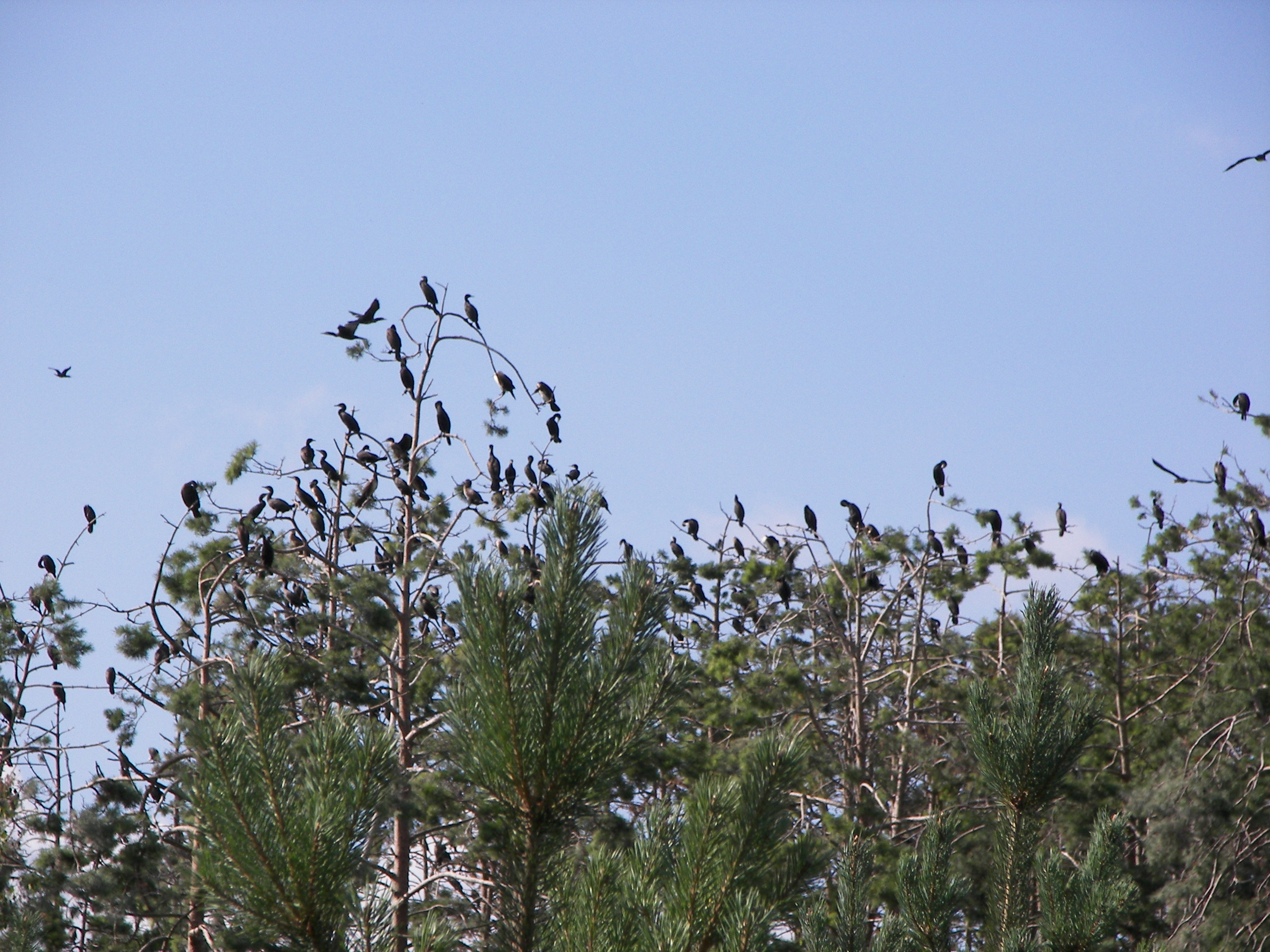
Great cormorants in the Kąty Rybackie nature reserve
