= Krynica Morska =

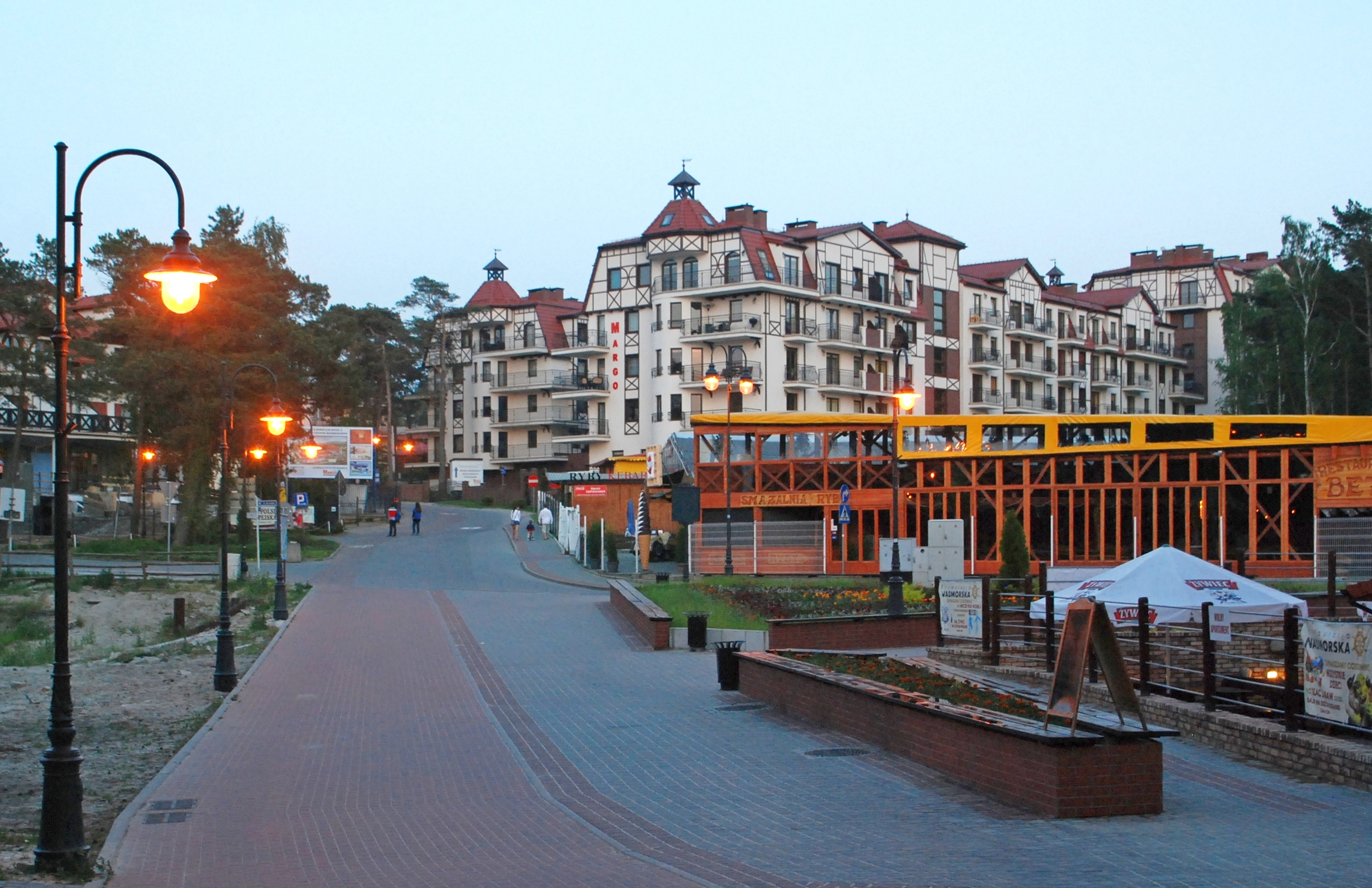

- Coat of arms
- Interactive map of Krynica Morska
- Location within Poland
- Coordinates: 54°22′57″N 19°26′40″E
- Country: Poland
- Voivodeship: Pomeranian
- County: Nowy Dwór
- Gmina: Krynica Morska (urban gmina)
- Established: 15th century
- Town rights: 1991

Government
  - Mayor: Sylwia Szczurek

Area
  - Total: 102.04 km^{2} (39.40 sq mi)

Population (2023)
  - Total: 1,172
  - Density: 11.49/km^{2} (29.75/sq mi)
- Time zone: UTC+1 (CET)
  - Summer (DST): UTC+2 (CEST)
- Postal code: 82-120
- Area code: +48 55
- Car plates: GND
- Climate: Cfb
- Website: http://www.krynicamorska.tv/

Krynica Morska [krɨˈɲit͡sa ˈmɔrska] (German: Kahlberg) is a resort town and coextensive municipality (gmina) on the Vistula Spit in northern Poland with 1,172 inhabitants as of 2023. It has been part of Nowy Dwór County in Pomeranian Voivodeship.

== Overview ==
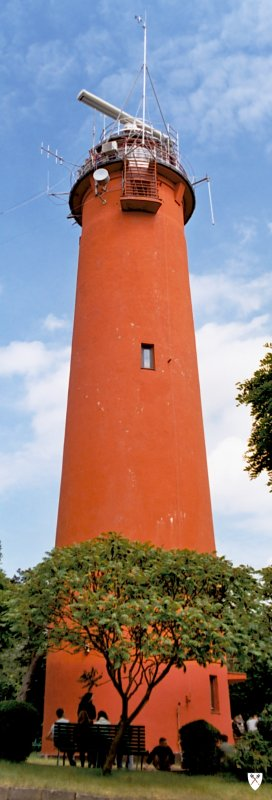
Lighthouse in Krynica Morska

Before 1793 the area was part of the Kingdom of Poland; from 1793-1945 Prussia (within Germany from 1871). The village was known as Kahlberg during that time. It was administered by the city of Danzig (now Gdańsk) until 1842, and afterwards by the city of Elbing (now Elbląg).

The settlement was first mentioned in 1424 and became a summer resort around 1840. When it came back under Polish rule after the Second World War, it was given the name Łysica (the Polish root łys- corresponding to the German kahl, meaning "bald"). In 1958 it was renamed Krynica Morska (Krynica is an obsolete, poetic term for "spring"; Morska meaning "of the sea", i.e., "sea spring" or "seaside spring") as opposed to the other famous Polish resort of Krynica. From 1975 to 1998, it was administratively located in the Elbląg Voivodeship.

In 1991 three former villages, Krynica Morska, Nowa Karczma, and Przebrno of Gmina Sztutowo were united into a new gmina, Krynica Morska, which simultaneously was assigned the town status.

Krynica Morska is the main tourist destination on the Vistula Spit. The administrative area of the town extends along most of the Polish part of the spit, up to the Russian border, also including a number of other localities such as Przebrno and Piaski (the latter being about 4 kilometres (2 miles) from the border, which is not crossable at present).

It has the smallest population of any urban commune (gmina) in Poland. Because of the inclusion of mainly rural areas of the spit within its boundaries, it has the lowest population density of any town (miasto) in Poland, with 11.74 persons/km².

The Lighthouse in Krynica Morska was originally built in 1895. It was destroyed in 1945 after being mined by retreating German forces. A new lighthouse, now open to visitors, was built in 1951. Adjacent to it is a small cemetery with a monument to the Soviet soldiers killed in the explosion that destroyed the original building.

== Gallery ==
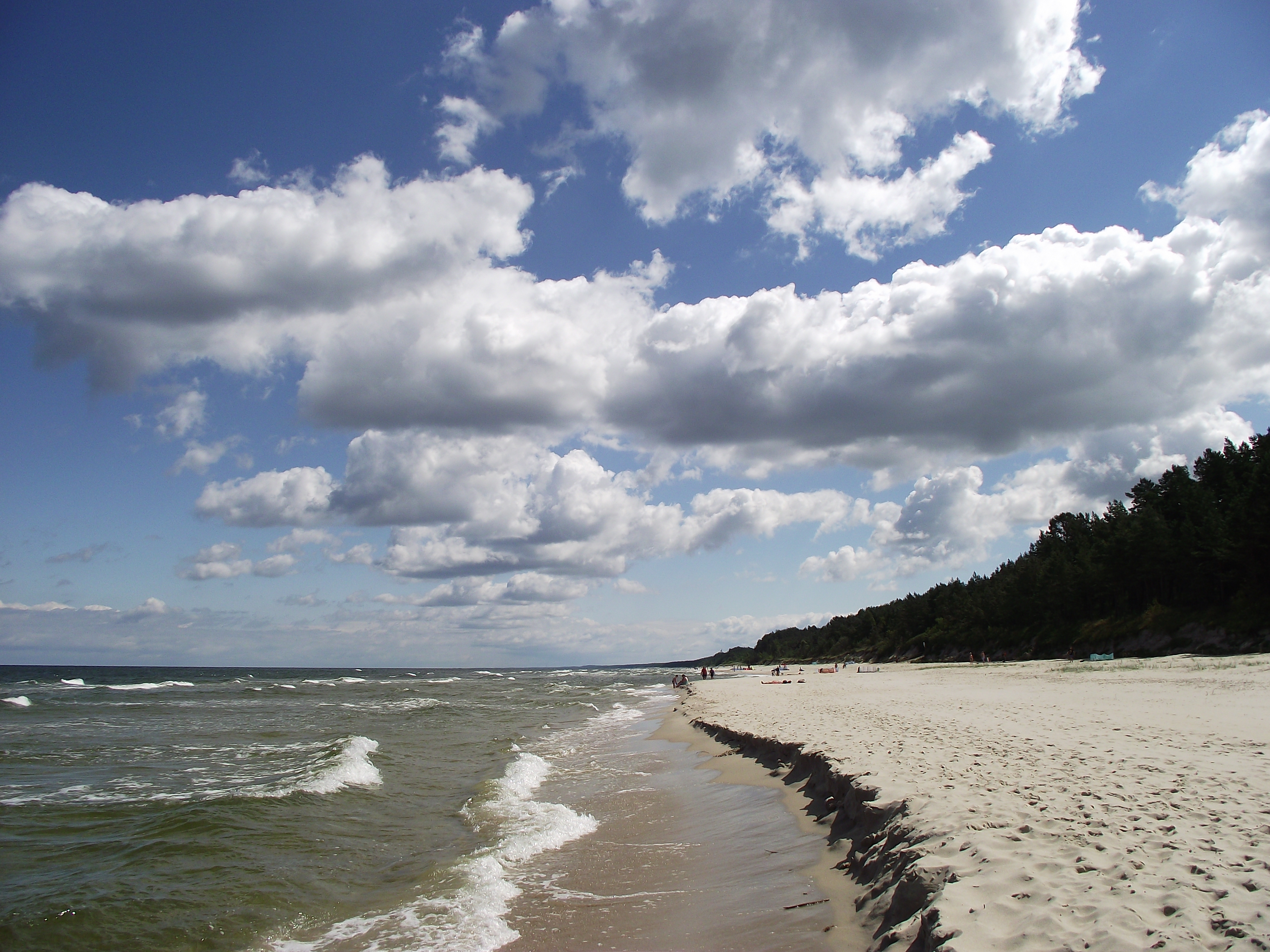
Beach in Krynica Morska

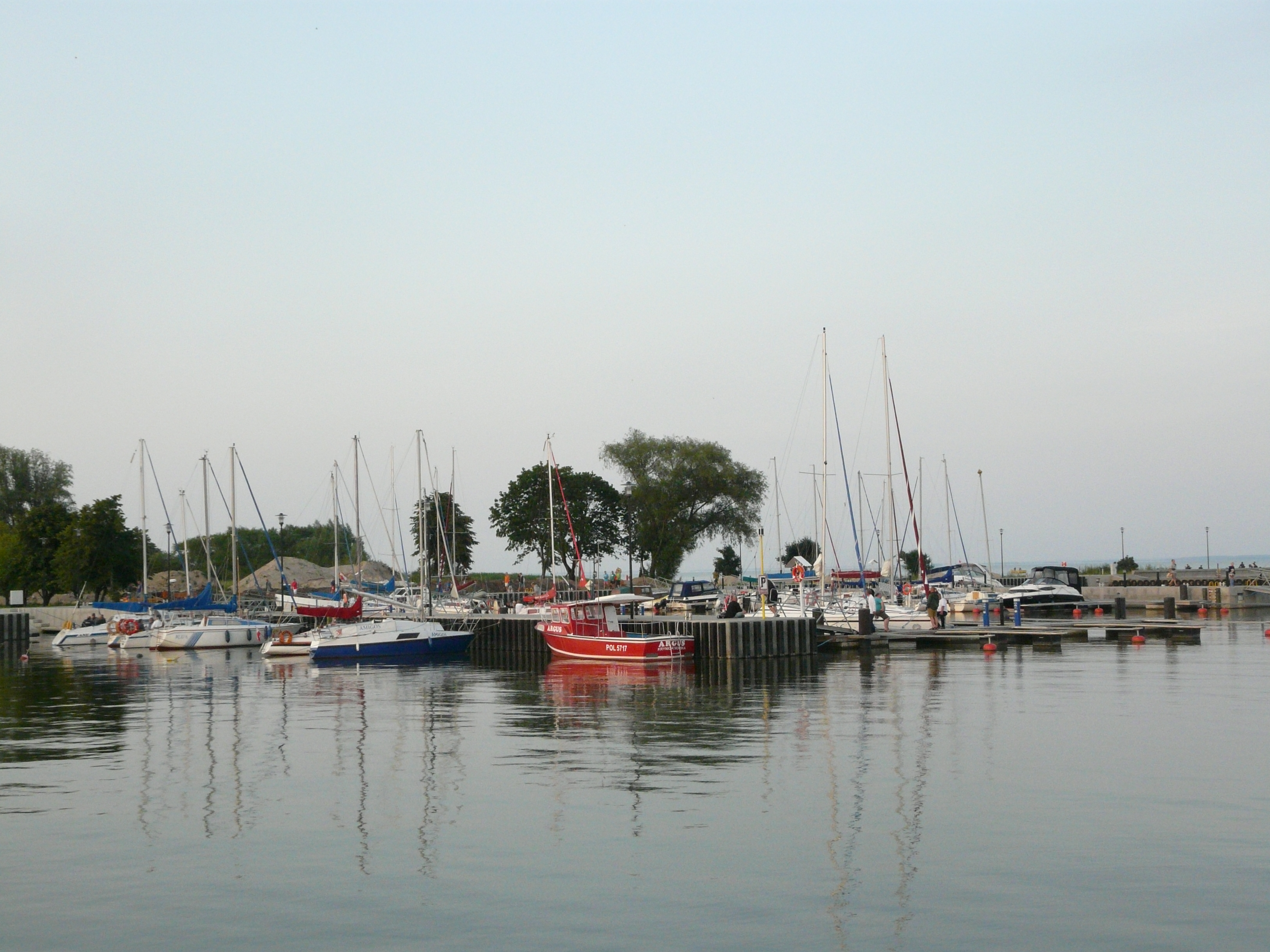
Port of Krynica Morska

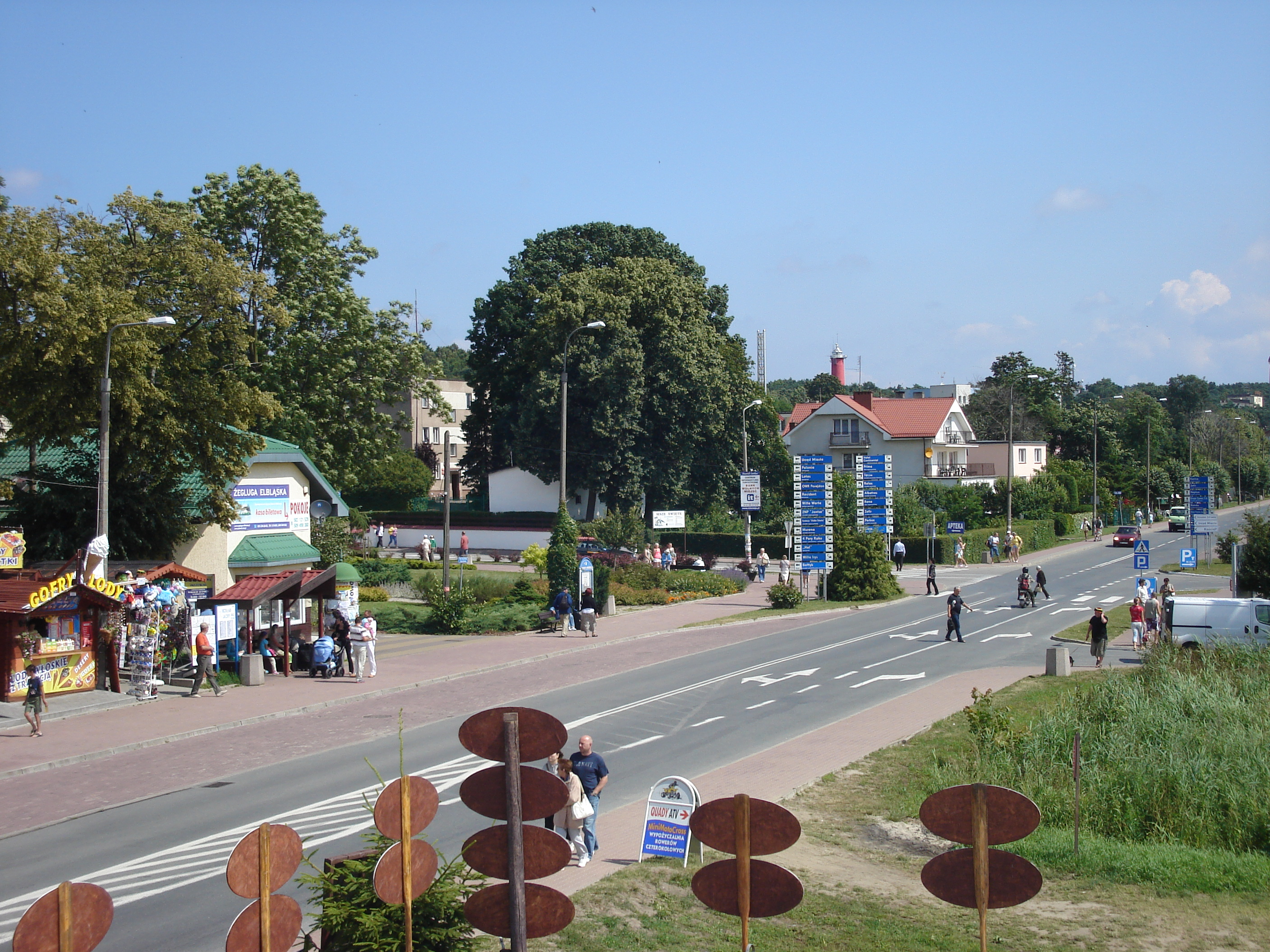
Gdańska street

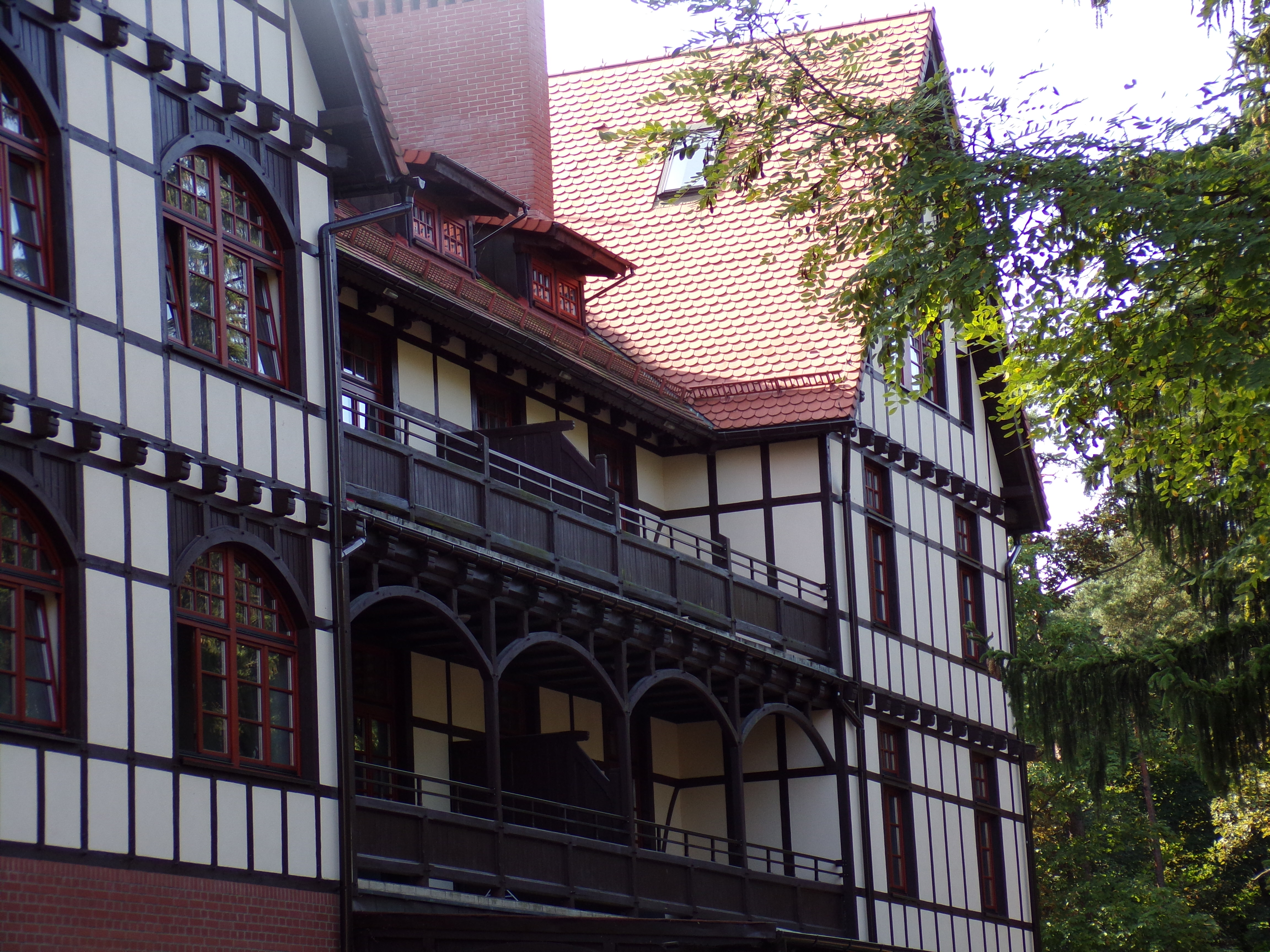
Heritage architecture

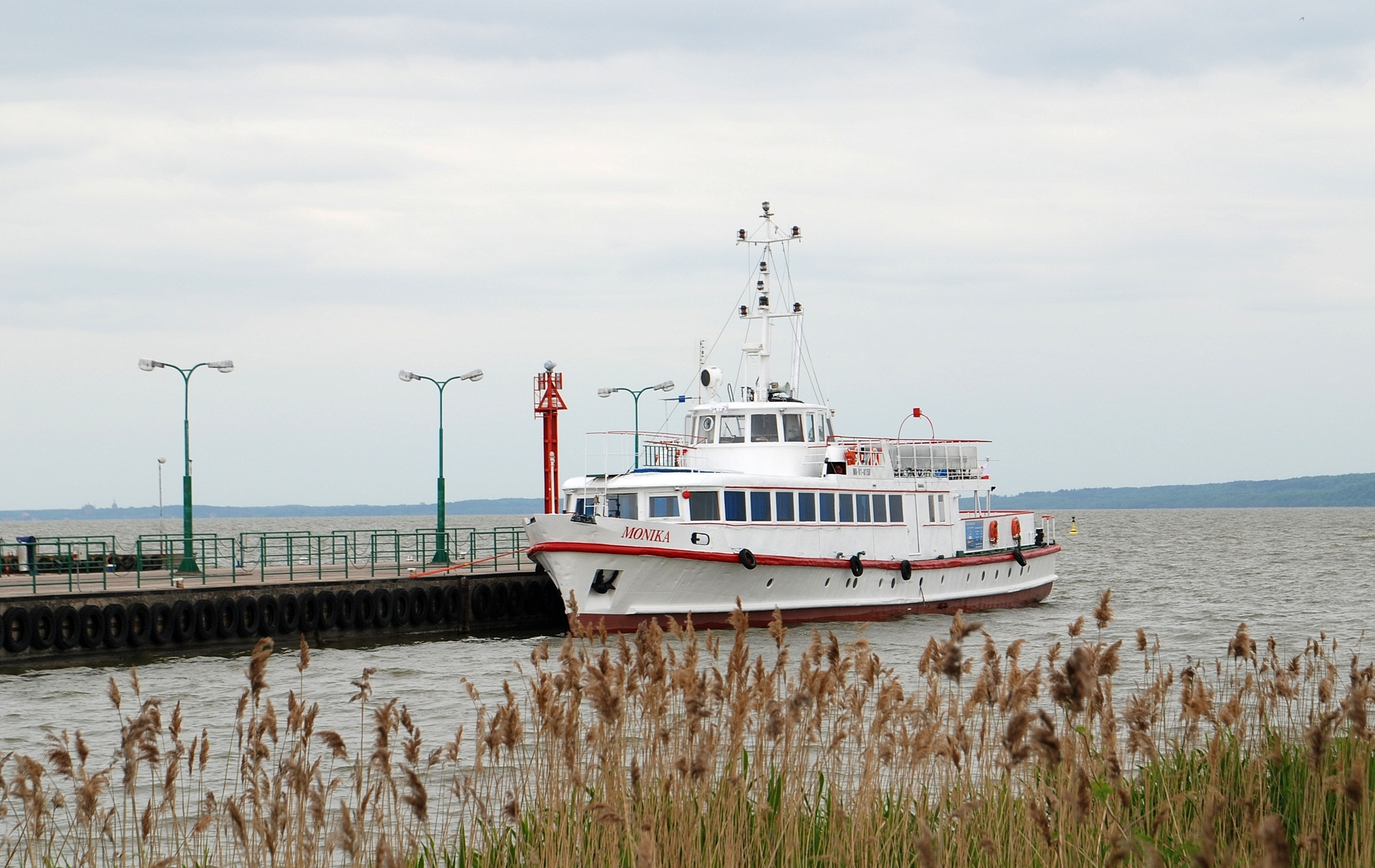

Russian border buffer area at Piaski Beach
