= Gmina Sztutowo =

Gmina Sztutowo Sztutowo Commune
- Gmina
- Coat of arms
- Interactive map of Gmina Sztutowo
- Coordinates (Sztutowo): 54°19′33″N 19°10′44″E
- Country: Poland
- Voivodeship: Pomeranian
- County: Nowy Dwór
- Seat: Sztutowo

Area
  - Total: 107.49 km^{2} (41.50 sq mi)

Population (2006)
  - Total: 3,517
  - Density: 32.72/km^{2} (84.74/sq mi)
- Website: http://www.sztutowo.ug.gov.pl

Gmina Sztutowo is a rural gmina (administrative district) in Nowy Dwór County, Pomeranian Voivodeship, in northern Poland.

The seat of gmina is Sztutowo, which lies approximately 13 kilometres (8 mi) north of Nowy Dwór Gdański and 36 km (22 mi) east of the regional capital Gdańsk.

The gmina covers an area of 107.49 square kilometres (41.5 sq mi), and as of 2006 its total population is 3,517.

The gmina contains part of the protected area called Vistula Spit Landscape Park.

== Villages ==
Gmina Sztutowo contains the villages and settlements of Doły, Dublewo, Graniczna, Grochowo Drugie, Grochowo Pierwsze, Grochowo Trzecie, Groszkowo, Kąty Rybackie, Kobyla Kępa, Łaszka, Płonina, Przyłap, Skowronki, Sztutowo, Sztutowska Kępa and Wydmina.

== Neighbouring gminas ==
Gmina Sztutowo is bordered by the town of Krynica Morska and by the gminas of Nowy Dwór Gdański, Stegna and Tolkmicko.
