= Biskupice =

Biskupice (meaning Bishop's people) is the name of several locations in central Europe:

== Czech Republic ==
- Biskupice (Chrudim District), a municipality and village in the Pardubice Region
- Biskupice (Prostějov District), a municipality and village in the Olomouc Region
- Biskupice (Svitavy District), a municipality and village in the Pardubice Region
- Biskupice (Zlín District), a municipality and village in the Zlín Region
- Biskupice, a village and part of Biskupice-Pulkov in the Vysočina Region

== Poland ==
- Biskupice, Legnica County in Lower Silesian Voivodeship (south-west Poland)
- Biskupice, Oleśnica County in Lower Silesian Voivodeship (south-west Poland)
- Biskupice, Wrocław County in Lower Silesian Voivodeship (south-west Poland)
- Biskupice, Radziejów County in Kuyavian-Pomeranian Voivodeship (central Poland)
- Biskupice, Toruń County in Kuyavian-Pomeranian Voivodeship (north-central Poland)
- Biskupice, Łódź Voivodeship (central Poland)
- Biskupice, Dąbrowa County in Lesser Poland Voivodeship (south Poland)
- Biskupice, Kraków County in Lesser Poland Voivodeship (south Poland)
- Biskupice, Lublin Voivodeship (east Poland)
- Biskupice, Miechów County in Lesser Poland Voivodeship (south Poland)
- Biskupice, Proszowice County in Lesser Poland Voivodeship (south Poland)
- Biskupice, Wieliczka County in Lesser Poland Voivodeship (south Poland)
  - Gmina Biskupice, Wieliczka County
- Biskupice, Busko County in Świętokrzyskie Voivodeship (south Poland)
- Biskupice, Opatów County in Świętokrzyskie Voivodeship (south-central Poland)
- Biskupice, Pińczów County in Świętokrzyskie Voivodeship (south Poland)
- Biskupice, Gmina Brudzeń Duży in Masovian Voivodeship (central Poland)
- Biskupice, Gmina Drobin in Masovian Voivodeship (central Poland)
- Biskupice, Pruszków County in Masovian Voivodeship (east-central Poland)
- Biskupice, Gniezno County in Greater Poland Voivodeship (west-central Poland)
- Biskupice, Kalisz County in Greater Poland Voivodeship (west-central Poland)
- Biskupice, Konin County in Greater Poland Voivodeship (west-central Poland)
- Biskupice, Gmina Nowe Skalmierzyce, Ostrów County in Greater Poland Voivodeship (west-central Poland)
- Biskupice, Poznań County in Greater Poland Voivodeship (west-central Poland)
- Biskupice, Gmina Dominowo, Środa County in Greater Poland Voivodeship (west-central Poland)
- Biskupice, Wolsztyn County in Greater Poland Voivodeship (west Poland)
- Biskupice, Częstochowa County in Silesian Voivodeship (south Poland)
- Biskupice, Zawiercie County in Silesian Voivodeship (south Poland)
- Biskupice, Kluczbork County in Opole Voivodeship (south Poland)
- Biskupice, Olesno County in Opole Voivodeship (south Poland)
- Biskupice, West Pomeranian Voivodeship (north-west Poland)
- Biskupice, a district of Zabrze
- Biskupice Radłowskie, a village
- Biskupice Oławskie, a village
- Biskupice Podgórne, a village
- Biskupice Ołoboczne, a village
- Biskupice Melsztyńskie, a village
- Biskupice-Kolonia, West Pomeranian Voivodeship, a settlement
- Biskupice-Kolonia, Greater Poland Voivodeship, a settlement
- Biskupice Zabaryczne, a village
- Nowe Biskupice, Lubusz Voivodeship, a village in the administrative district of Gmina Słubice
- Nowe Biskupice, Masovian Voivodeship, a village in the administrative district of Gmina Warka
- Stare Biskupice, Lubusz Voivodeship, a village in the administrative district of Gmina Słubice
- Stare Biskupice, Masovian Voivodeship, a village in the administrative district of Gmina Warka

== Slovakia ==
- Biskupice, Lučenec District, a village in Banská Bystrica Region
- Biskupice, a district of Bánovce nad Bebravou
- Biskupice, a district of Trenčín
- Podunajské Biskupice

== Germany ==
- Biskupice, historic Czech and Polish name of Bischofswerda, Saxony
