= Sułów =

Sułów or Sulów may refer to the following places in Poland:

- Sułów, Lesser Poland Voivodeship (south Poland)
- Sułów, Lower Silesian Voivodeship (south-west Poland)
- Sułów, Lubusz Voivodeship (west Poland)
- Sułów, Lublin Voivodeship (east Poland)
- Sulów, Lublin Voivodeship (east Poland)
