= Orzeszkowo =

Orzeszkowo may refer to the following places:

- Orzeszkowo, Międzychód County in Greater Poland Voivodeship (west-central Poland)
- Orzeszkowo, Gmina Dominowo, Środa County in Greater Poland Voivodeship (west-central Poland)
- Orzeszkowo, Podlaskie Voivodeship (north-east Poland)
- Orzeszkowo, West Pomeranian Voivodeship (north-west Poland)
