= Biškupić =

Biškupić or Biskupic is a Croatian surname. Notable people with the surname include:

- Božo Biškupić (born 1938), Croatian politician and lawyer
- Joan Biskupic (born c. 1956), American journalist, author, and lawyer
- Steven M. Biskupic (born 1961), U.S. Attorney for the Eastern District of Wisconsin

== See also ==
- Biskupice (disambiguation)
