= Gmina Radłów =

Gmina Radłów may refer to either of the following administrative districts in Poland:

- Gmina Radłów, Lesser Poland Voivodeship
- Gmina Radłów, Opole Voivodeship
