= Sławkowice =

- Village
- Location within Poland
- Coordinates: 49°57′N 20°9′E
- Country: Poland
- Voivodeship: Lesser Poland
- County: Wieliczka
- Gmina: Biskupice

Sławkowice [swafkɔˈvit͡sɛ] is a village in the administrative district of Gmina Biskupice, within Wieliczka County, Lesser Poland Voivodeship, in southern Poland.

== Famous people ==
- Stanisław Lubomirski (d. 1585) was a Polish nobleman (szlachcic) and owner of the Sławkowice and Zabłocie estates.
