= Bodzanów =

Bodzanów may refer to the following places:

- Bodzanów, Lesser Poland Voivodeship (south Poland)
- Bodzanów, Masovian Voivodeship (central Poland)
- Bodzanów, Opole Voivodeship (south Poland)
