= Anna Lubomirska =

Anna Lubomirska is the name of:

- Anna Lubomirska (XVI-); see Stanisław Lubomirski (d. 1585)
- Anna Lubomirska (d. 1736) (17th-century–1736), Polish noble lady
- Anna Lubomirska (d. 1763) (18th-century–1763), member of Polish nobility
- Anna Lubomirska (1882-1947); see Stanisław Albrecht Radziwiłł

== See also ==
- Lubomirski
