= Murzynowo Kościelne =

- Village
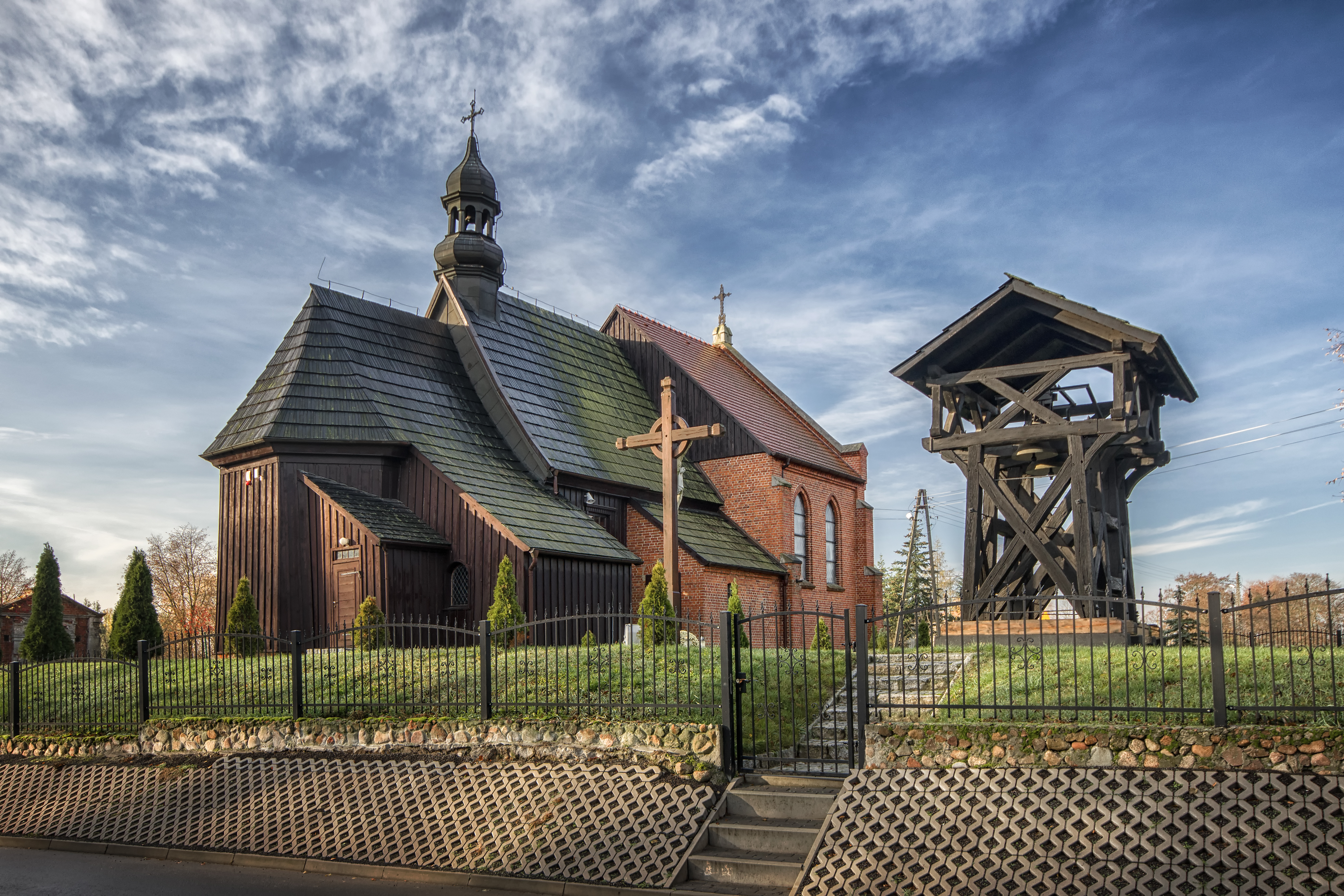
- St. John the Baptist Church in Murzynowo Kościelne

- Location within Poland
- Coordinates: 52°15′N 17°27′E
- Country: Poland
- Voivodeship: Greater Poland
- County: Środa
- Gmina: Dominowo

Murzynowo Kościelne [muʐɨˈnɔvɔ kɔɕˈt͡ɕɛlnɛ] is a village in the administrative district of Gmina Dominowo, within Środa County, Greater Poland Voivodeship, in west-central Poland.
