= Zborówek, Lesser Poland Voivodeship =

Zborówek
- Village
- Location within Poland
- Coordinates: 49°57′36″N 20°9′32″E
- Country: Poland
- Voivodeship: Lesser Poland
- County: Wieliczka
- Gmina: Biskupice

Zborówek [zbɔˈruvɛk] is a village in the administrative district of Gmina Biskupice, within Wieliczka County, Lesser Poland Voivodeship, in southern Poland.
