= Gmina Dominowo =

Gmina Dominowo Dominowo Commune
- Gmina
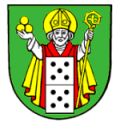
- Flag Coat of arms
- Interactive map of Gmina Dominowo
- Coordinates (Dominowo): 52°17′N 17°21′E
- Country: Poland
- Voivodeship: Greater Poland
- County: Środa
- Seat: Dominowo

Area
  - Total: 79.32 km^{2} (30.63 sq mi)

Population (2006)
  - Total: 2,829
  - Density: 35.67/km^{2} (92.37/sq mi)
- Website: http://www.dominowo.pl/

Gmina Dominowo is a rural gmina (administrative district) in Środa County, Greater Poland Voivodeship, in west-central Poland. Its seat is the village of Dominowo, which lies approximately 8 kilometres (5 mi) north-east of Środa Wielkopolska and 33 km (21 mi) south-east of the regional capital Poznań.

The gmina covers an area of 79.32 square kilometres (30.6 sq mi), and as of 2006 its total population is 2,829.

== Villages ==
Gmina Dominowo contains the villages and settlements of Andrzejpole, Bagrowo, Biskupice, Borzejewo, Bukowy Las, Chłapowo, Dominowo, Dzierżnica, Gablin, Giecz, Grodziszczko, Janowo, Karolewo, Kopaszyce, Marianowo, Michałowo, Mieczysławowo, Murzynowo Kościelne, Nowojewo, Orzeszkowo, Poświątno, Rusiborek, Rusibórz, Sabaszczewo, Szrapki, Wysławice and Zberki.

== Neighbouring gminas ==
Gmina Dominowo is bordered by the gminas of Kostrzyn, Miłosław, Nekla, Środa Wielkopolska and Września.
