= Grodziszczko, Gmina Dominowo =

Village in Gmina Dominowo, Poland

Grodziszczko
- Village
- Country: Poland
- Voivodeship: Greater Poland
- County: Środa
- Gmina: Dominowo

Grodziszczko [ɡrɔˈd͡ʑiʂt͡ʂkɔ] is a village in the administrative district of Gmina Dominowo, within Środa County, Greater Poland Voivodeship, in west-central Poland.
