= Gablin =

- Village
- Location within Poland
- Coordinates: 52°18′N 17°20′E
- Country: Poland
- Voivodeship: Greater Poland
- County: Środa
- Gmina: Dominowo

Gablin [ˈɡablin] is a village in the administrative district of Gmina Dominowo, within Środa County, Greater Poland Voivodeship, in west-central Poland.
