= Radłów, Opole Voivodeship =

Radłów Radlau
- Village
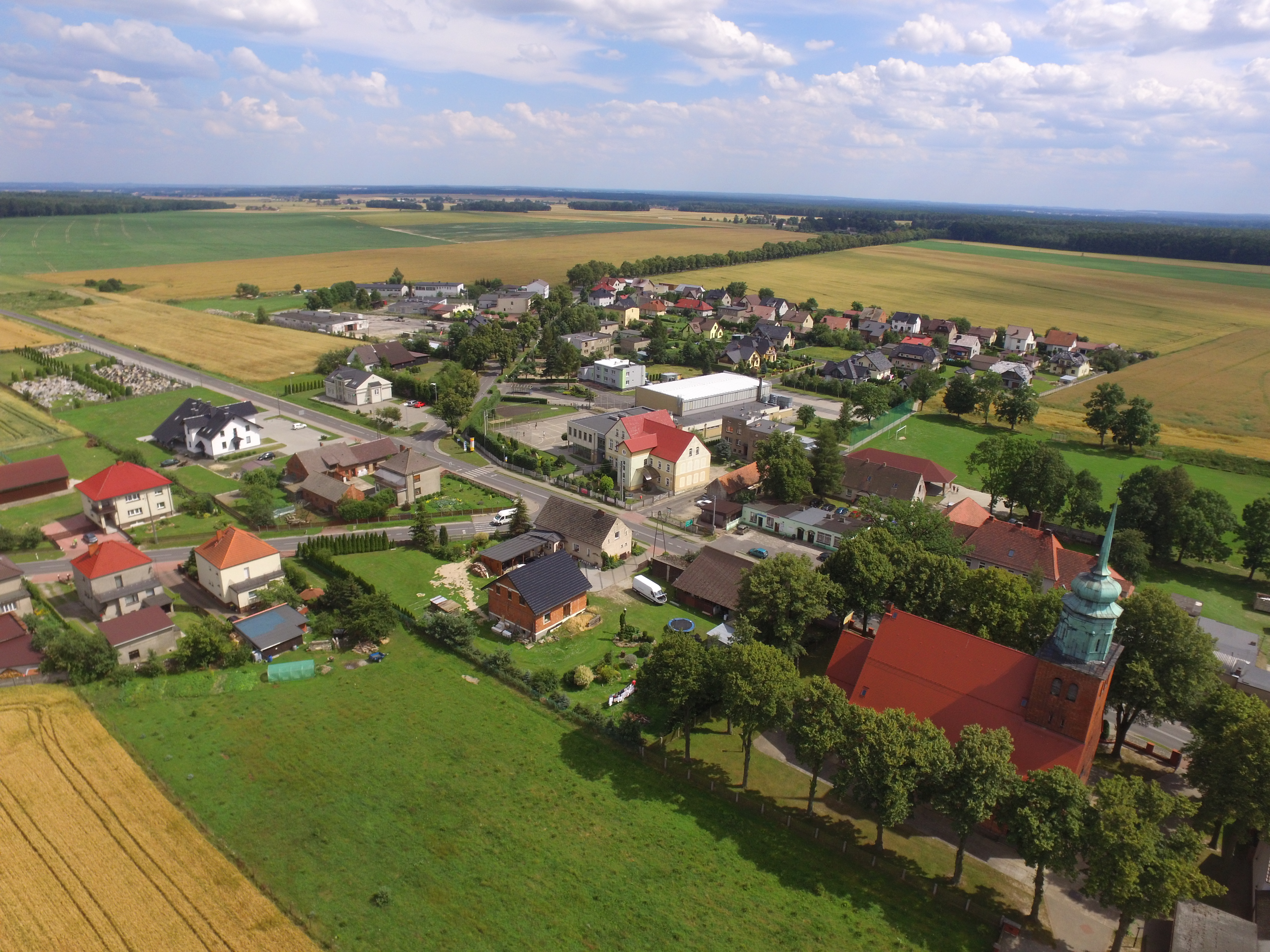
- Aerial view of Radłów

- Location within Poland
- Coordinates: 50°56′N 18°32′E
- Country: Poland
- Voivodeship: Opole
- County: Olesno
- Gmina: Radłów

Population
  - Total: 825
- Time zone: UTC+1 (CET)
  - Summer (DST): UTC+2 (CEST)
- Vehicle registration: OOL
- Website: http://www.radlow.pl

Radłów ([ˈradwuf]; German: Radlau) is a village in Olesno County, Opole Voivodeship, in southern Poland. It is the seat of the gmina (administrative district) called Gmina Radłów.
