= Szrapki =

- Village
- Location within Poland
- Coordinates: 52°16′38″N 17°21′25″E
- Country: Poland
- Voivodeship: Greater Poland
- County: Środa
- Gmina: Dominowo
- Population: 40

Szrapki [ˈʂrapki] is a village in the administrative district of Gmina Dominowo, within Środa County, Greater Poland Voivodeship, in west-central Poland.
