= Psurów =

Psurów Psurow
- Village
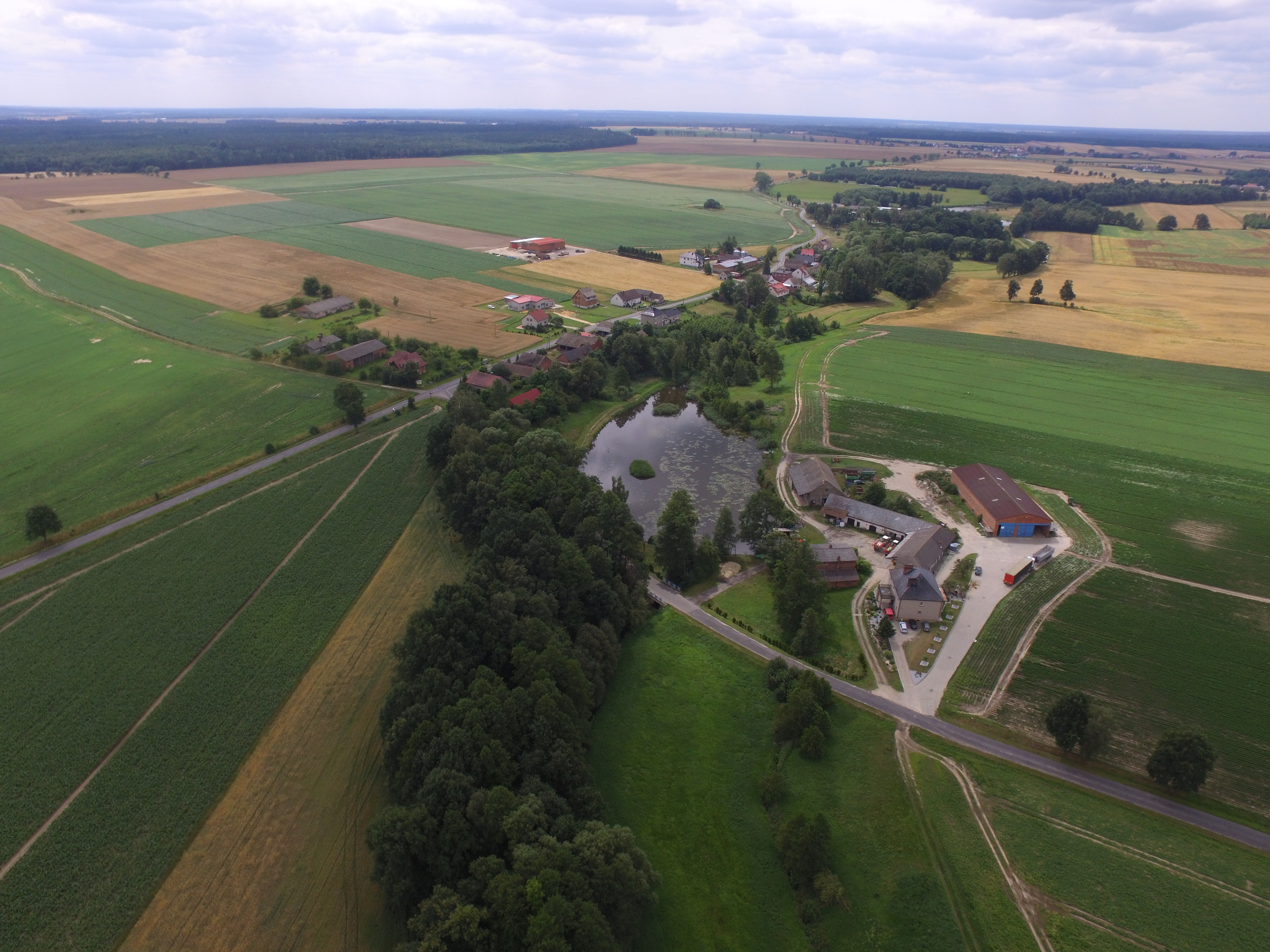
- Aerial view of Psurów

- Location within Poland
- Coordinates: 50°57′17″N 18°33′2″E
- Country: Poland
- Voivodeship: Opole
- County: Olesno
- Gmina: Radłów
- Time zone: UTC+1 (CET)
  - Summer (DST): UTC+2 (CEST)
- Vehicle registration: OOL

Psurów [ˈpsuruf] (German: Psurow) is a village in the administrative district of Gmina Radłów, within Olesno County, Opole Voivodeship, in southern Poland.
