= Zberki =

- Village
- Location within Poland
- Coordinates: 52°15′45″N 17°25′47″E
- Country: Poland
- Voivodeship: Greater Poland
- County: Środa
- Gmina: Dominowo

Zberki [ˈzbɛrki] is a village in the administrative district of Gmina Dominowo, within Środa County, Greater Poland Voivodeship, in west-central Poland.
