= Bagrowo =

- Village
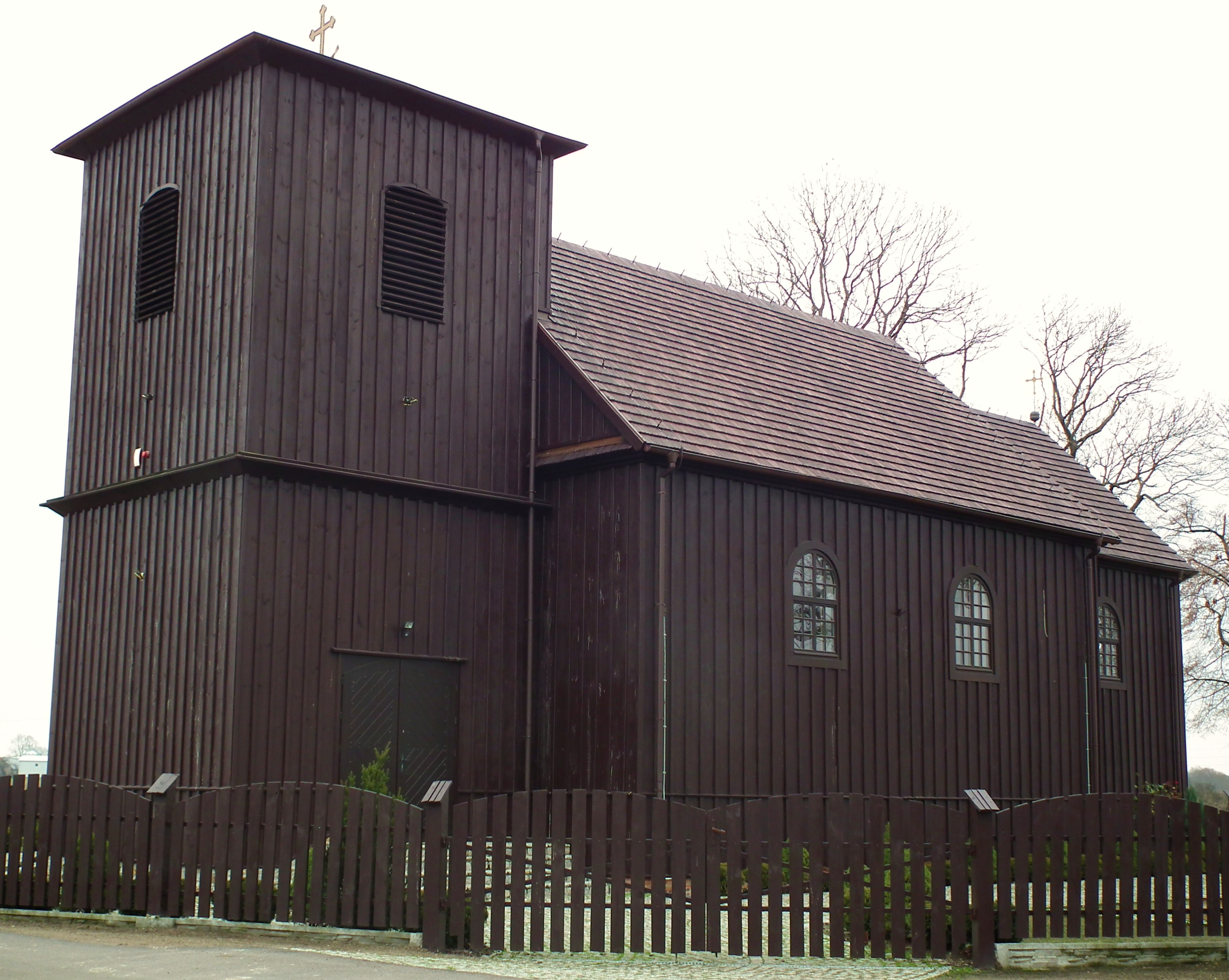
- Church in Bagrowo

- Location within Poland
- Coordinates: 52°17′N 17°19′E
- Country: Poland
- Voivodeship: Greater Poland
- County: Środa
- Gmina: Dominowo

Bagrowo [baˈɡrɔvɔ] is a village in the administrative district of Gmina Dominowo, within Środa County, Greater Poland Voivodeship, in west-central Poland.
