= Tomaszkowice =

- Village
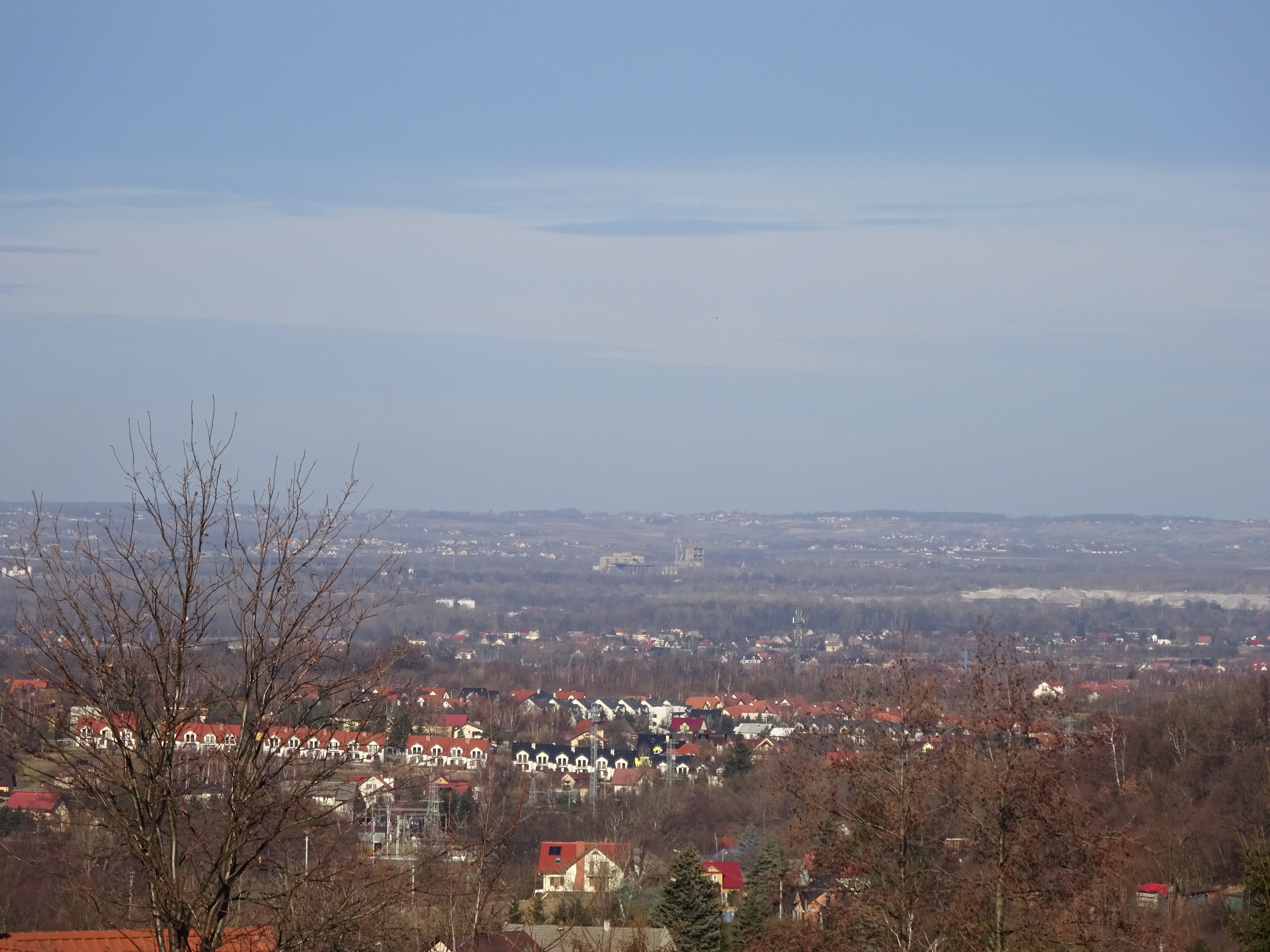
- General view

- Location within Poland
- Coordinates: 49°58′34″N 20°5′52″E
- Country: Poland
- Voivodeship: Lesser Poland
- County: Wieliczka
- Gmina: Biskupice
- Population (approx.): 600

Tomaszkowice [tɔmaʂkɔˈvit͡sɛ] is a village in the administrative district of Gmina Biskupice, within Wieliczka County, Lesser Poland Voivodeship, in southern Poland.

The village has an approximate population of 600.
