= Rusiborek =

- Village
- Location within Poland
- Coordinates: 52°15′34″N 17°23′3″E
- Country: Poland
- Voivodeship: Greater Poland
- County: Środa
- Gmina: Dominowo

Rusiborek [ruɕiˈbɔrɛk] is a village in the administrative district of Gmina Dominowo, within Środa County, Greater Poland Voivodeship, in west-central Poland.
