= Biskupskie Drogi =

Biskupskie Drogi Strassenkrug
- Settlement
- Location within Poland
- Coordinates: 50°55′57″N 18°29′38″E
- Country: Poland
- Voivodeship: Opole
- County: Olesno
- Gmina: Radłów
- Time zone: UTC+1 (CET)
  - Summer (DST): UTC+2 (CEST)
- Vehicle registration: OOL

Biskupskie Drogi [bisˈkupskʲɛ ˈdrɔɡi] (German: Strassenkrug) is a settlement in the administrative district of Gmina Radłów, within Olesno County, Opole Voivodeship, in southern Poland.
