= Stare Karmonki =

Stare Karmonki Alt Karmunkau
- Village
- Location within Poland
- Coordinates: 50°55′06″N 18°32′46″E
- Country: Poland
- Voivodeship: Opole
- County: Olesno
- Gmina: Radłów
- Time zone: UTC+1 (CET)
  - Summer (DST): UTC+2 (CEST)
- Vehicle registration: OOL

Stare Karmonki [ˈstarɛ karˈmɔnki] (German: Alt Karmunkau) is a village in the administrative district of Gmina Radłów, within Olesno County, Opole Voivodeship, in southern Poland.
