= Stanisław Lubomirski (d. 1577) =

Polish nobleman

- Coat of arms: Lubomirski
- Born: 16th century
- Died: 1577
- Noble family: Lubomirski
- Consorts: Laura de Effremis; Barbara Hruszowska
- Father: Feliks Lubomirski
- Mother: Beata

Stanisław Lubomirski (died 1577) was a Polish nobleman (szlachcic) and owner of the Sławkowice and Zabłocie estates.

He had two consorts, Laura de Effremis and Barbara Hruszowska. He had three children with Hruszowska: Sebastian Lubomirski, Katarzyna Lubomirska, Anna Lubomirska.
