= Ligota Oleska =

Ligota Oleska Ellguth
- Village
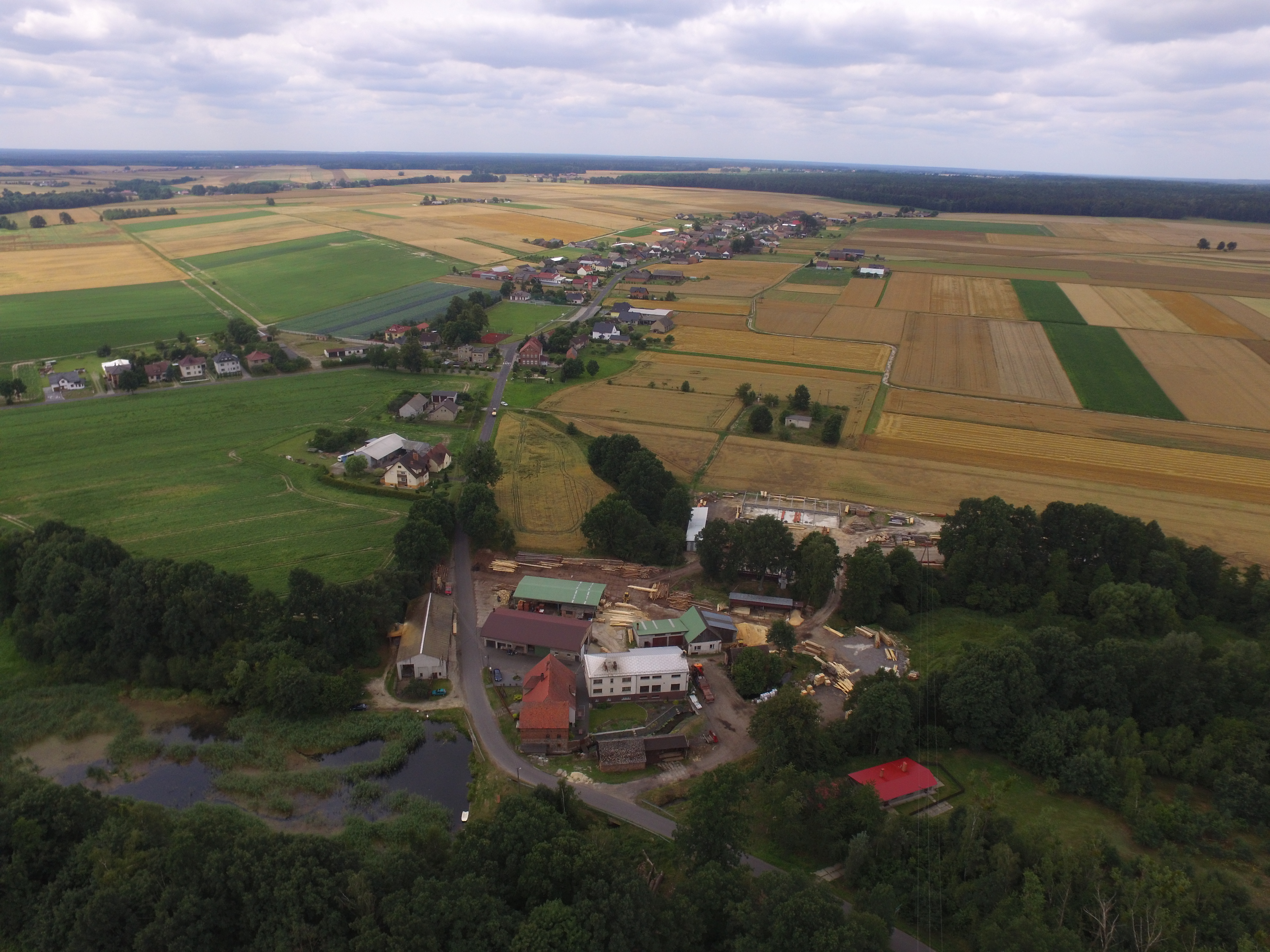

- Location within Poland
- Coordinates: 50°57′N 18°31′E
- Country: Poland
- Voivodeship: Opole
- County: Olesno
- Gmina: Radłów

Population
  - Total: 395
- Time zone: UTC+1 (CET)
  - Summer (DST): UTC+2 (CEST)
- Vehicle registration: OOL

Ligota Oleska [liˈɡɔta ɔˈlɛska] is a village in the administrative district of Gmina Radłów, within Olesno County, Opole Voivodeship, in southern Poland.
