= Mieczysławowo, Greater Poland Voivodeship =

Mieczysławowo
- Village
- Location within Poland
- Coordinates: 52°21′39″N 18°47′13″E
- Country: Poland
- Voivodeship: Greater Poland
- County: Środa
- Gmina: Dominowo

Mieczysławowo [mjɛt͡ʂɨswaˈvɔvɔ] is a village in the administrative district of Gmina Dominowo, within Środa County, Greater Poland Voivodeship, in west-central Poland.
