= Milan Máčala =

Czech footballer and coach

Personal information
- Date of birth: 4 August 1943 (age 83)
- Place of birth: Biskupice u Luhačovic, Bohemia and Moravia, Nazi Germany (now Biskupice, Czech Republic)
- Position: Defender

Youth career
- TJ Gottwaldov

Senior career*
Years	Team	Apps	(Gls)
1965–1967	TJ Gottwaldov		
1968–1970	Viktoria Plzeň		
1971–1974	TJ Vítkovice		
1975–1978	Sigma Olomouc		

Managerial career
- 1980–1981: Sigma Olomouc
- 1982–1984: Slavia Prague
- 1984–1986: Nea Salamis
- 1986–1990: Baník Ostrava
- 1990–1993: Czechoslovakia
- 1994–1996: Kazma
- 1994–1997: Kuwait
- 1997: United Arab Emirates
- 1998: Kuwait
- 1999–2000: Saudi Arabia
- 1999–2001: Al Nasr
- 2001–2004: Oman
- 2005: Al Ain
- 2006–2007: Oman
- 2007–2010: Bahrain
- 2010–2012: Kazma
- 2012–2015: Al Ahli
- 2018: Al Ahli
- * Club domestic league appearances and goals

Milan Máčala (born 4 August 1943) is a Czech football coach who coached various clubs in the Czech Republic and the Middle East.

He has previously coached in the area with the national teams of Oman, United Arab Emirates, Saudi Arabia, Kuwait and Bahrain, winning the Arabian Gulf Cup with the Kuwait in 1996 and 1998. As a player, he made his name with SK Sigma Olomouc where he also began his coaching career before going on to work for Slavia Prague, FC Baník Ostrava, the Czechoslovakia national football team, Kazma Sporting Club, Al Nasr and Al Ain FC.

Milan Máčala left his position as head coach of Bahrain in 2010 by mutual consent.
