= Sternalice, Opole Voivodeship =

Sternalice Sternalitz
- Village
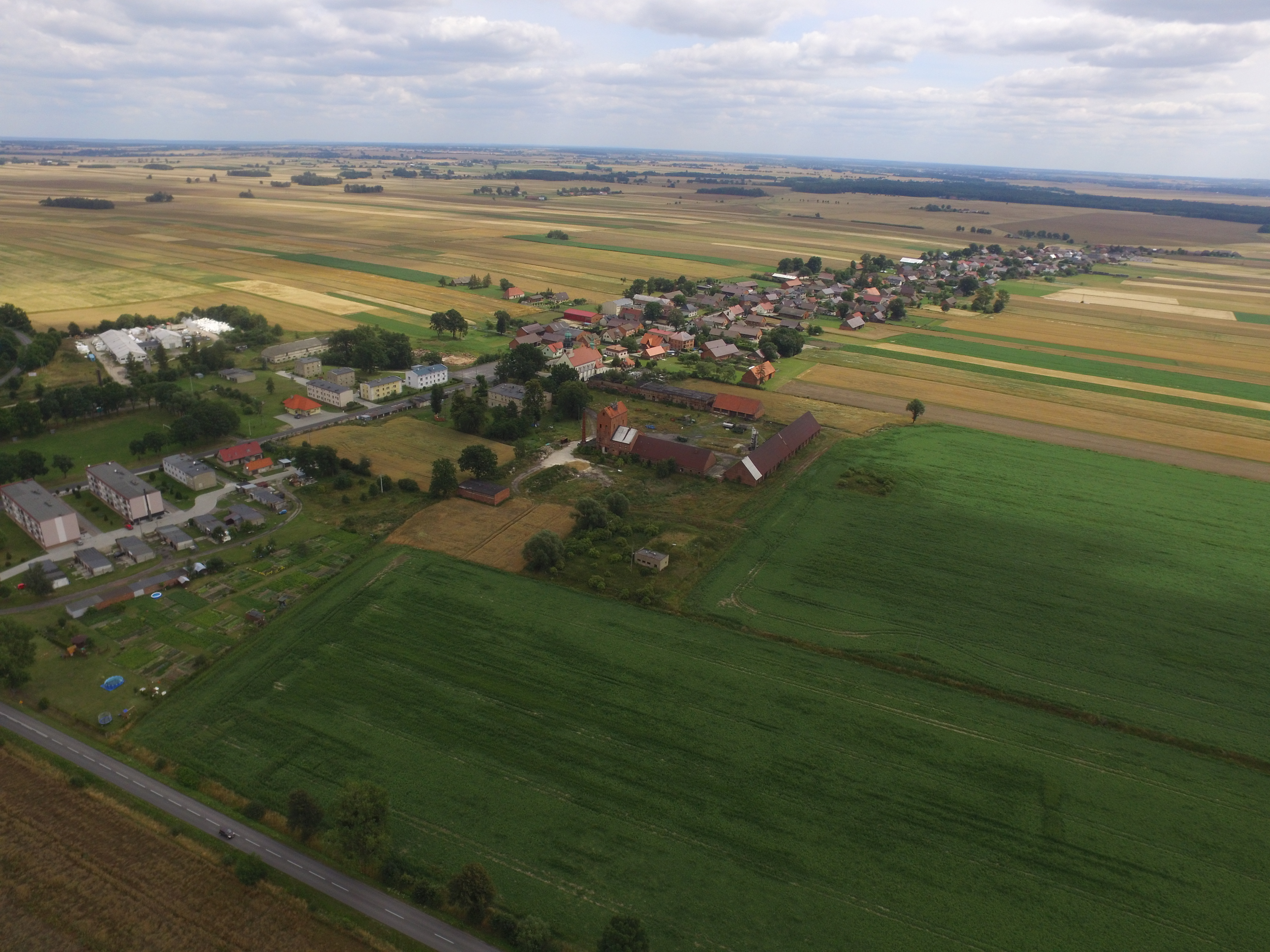

- Location within Poland
- Coordinates: 50°58′N 18°34′E
- Country: Poland
- Voivodeship: Opole
- County: Olesno
- Gmina: Radłów

Population
  - Total: 838
- Time zone: UTC+1 (CET)
  - Summer (DST): UTC+2 (CEST)
- Vehicle registration: OOL

Sternalice [stɛrnaˈlit͡sɛ] is a village in the administrative district of Gmina Radłów, within Olesno County, Opole Voivodeship, in southern Poland.
