= Giecz =

- Village
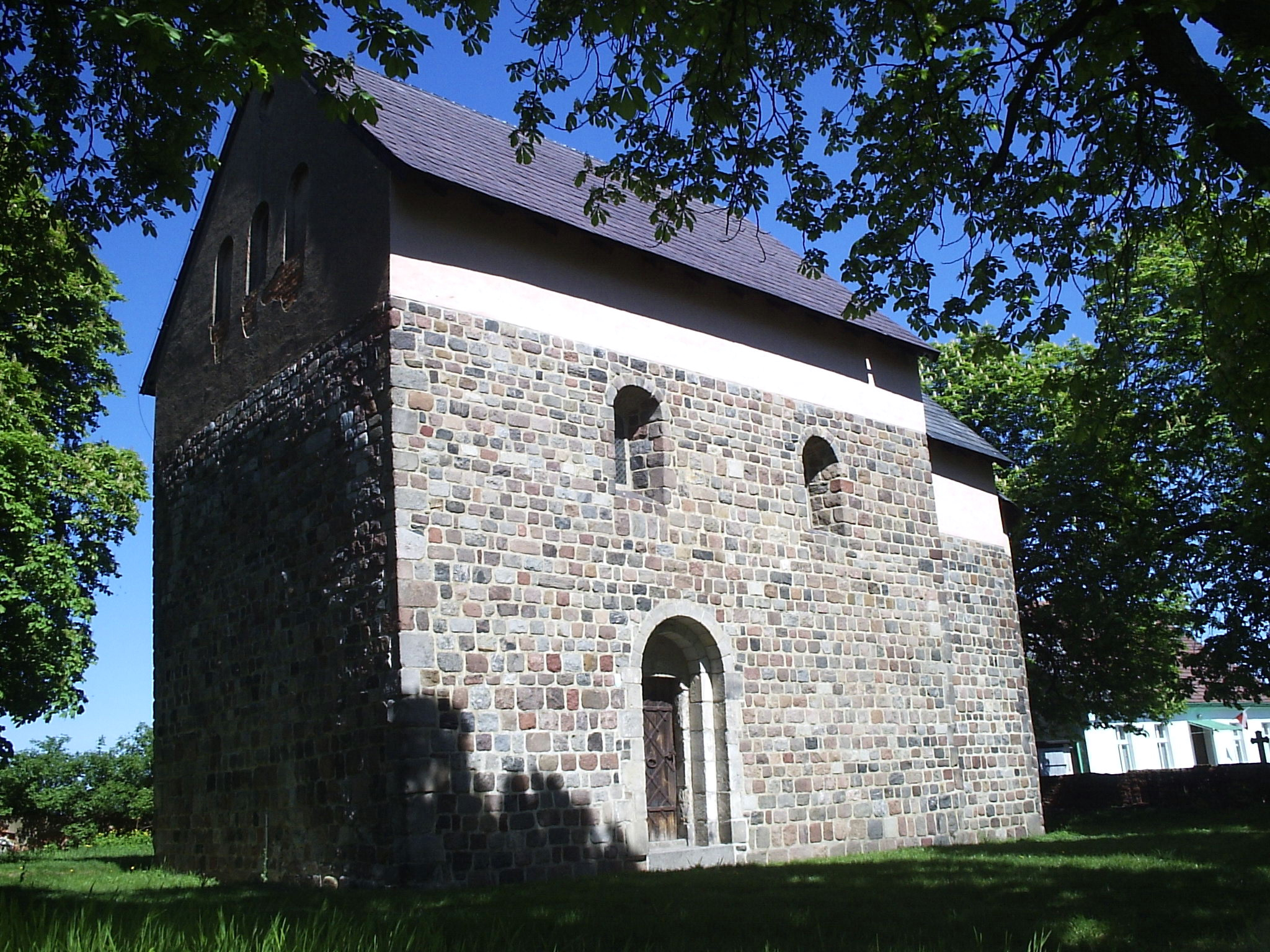
- Romanesque church in Giecz

- Location within Poland
- Coordinates: 52°19′15″N 17°22′25″E
- Country: Poland
- Voivodeship: Greater Poland
- County: Środa
- Gmina: Dominowo
- Population: 140

Giecz [ɡʲɛt͡ʂ] is a village in the administrative district of Gmina Dominowo, within Środa County, Greater Poland Voivodeship, in west-central Poland.

Giecz was once one of the main centres of Polish statehood in the early Middle Ages, alongside Poznań and Gniezno. In the early 9th century, a small keep was built on a mound on a peninsula on the Giecz lake; fortified with a stockade and earthworks. Since 940 it was one of the key strongholds of the early Piast dynasty. In 1038 during a war with Bohemia, the place was seized by Bretislaus I, who sacked the nearby settlement and sold its inhabitants into slavery. The place quickly recovered and by the 13th century was a centre of administration, trade and commerce in the Greater Poland region. At about that time, the settlement received a town charter and became the seat of a castellany. However, in 1331, it was burnt to the ground, never to recover.

== Archaeological finds ==
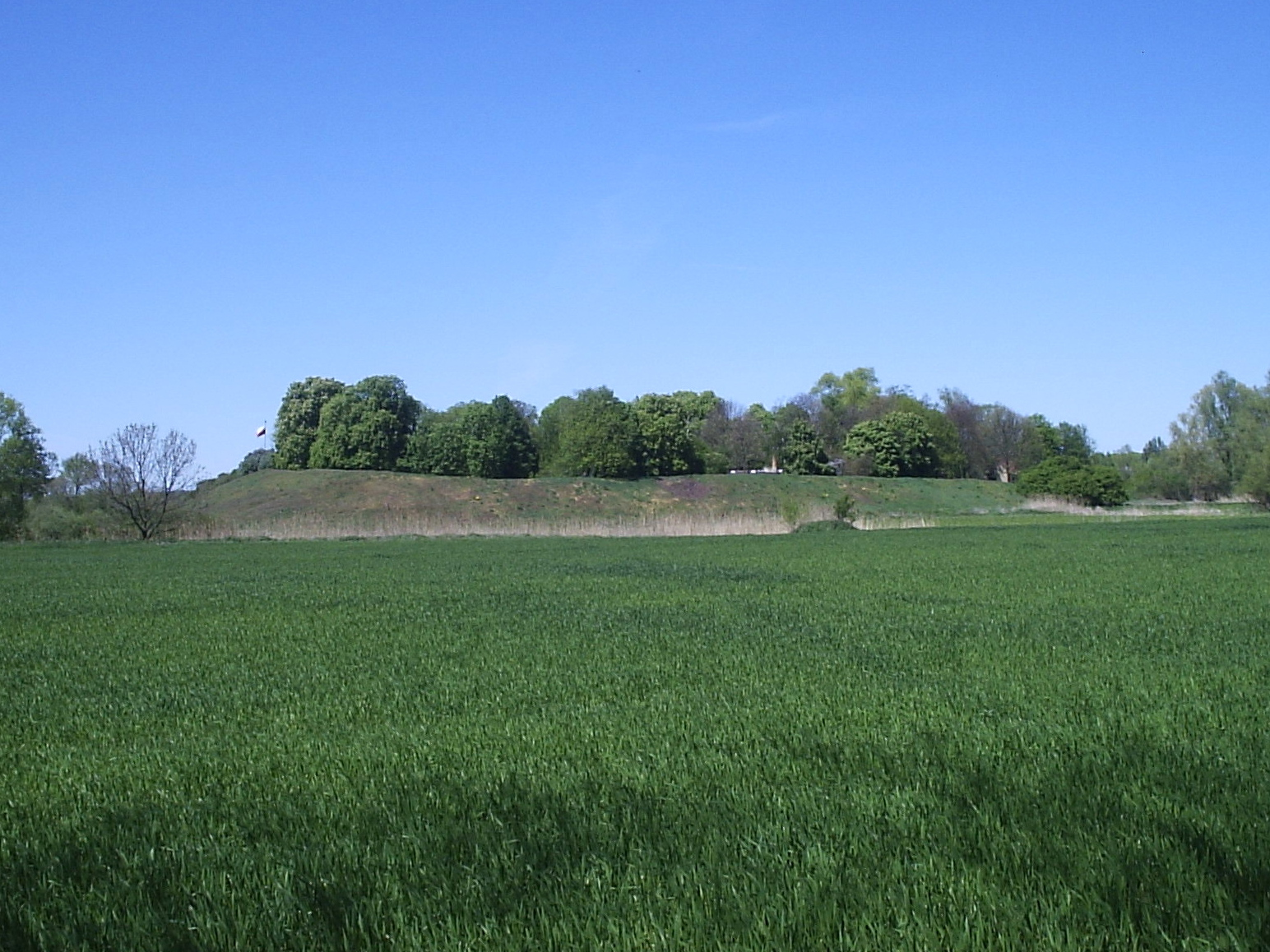
Mound at Giecz, site of an important 10th-century Piast dynasty fort

After 1945, archaeologists discovered the remnants of a mediaeval pallatium, a pre-Romanesque rotunda, stone walls, a 13th-century palace and several sites of primitive iron-ore working.

Currently, Giecz is the site of ongoing excavations. There are two habitation phases being excavated at the same location. The first is a cemetery dated to the 10-11th century. The second, located just beneath the cemetery, is an earlier settlement. Features of this settlement include open earthen structures, hearths, storage pits, and rich culture layers. Funding for these excavations is provided by the Slavia Foundation and the First Piasts Museum, Lednica.
