= Jawczyce, Lesser Poland Voivodeship =

Jawczyce
- Village
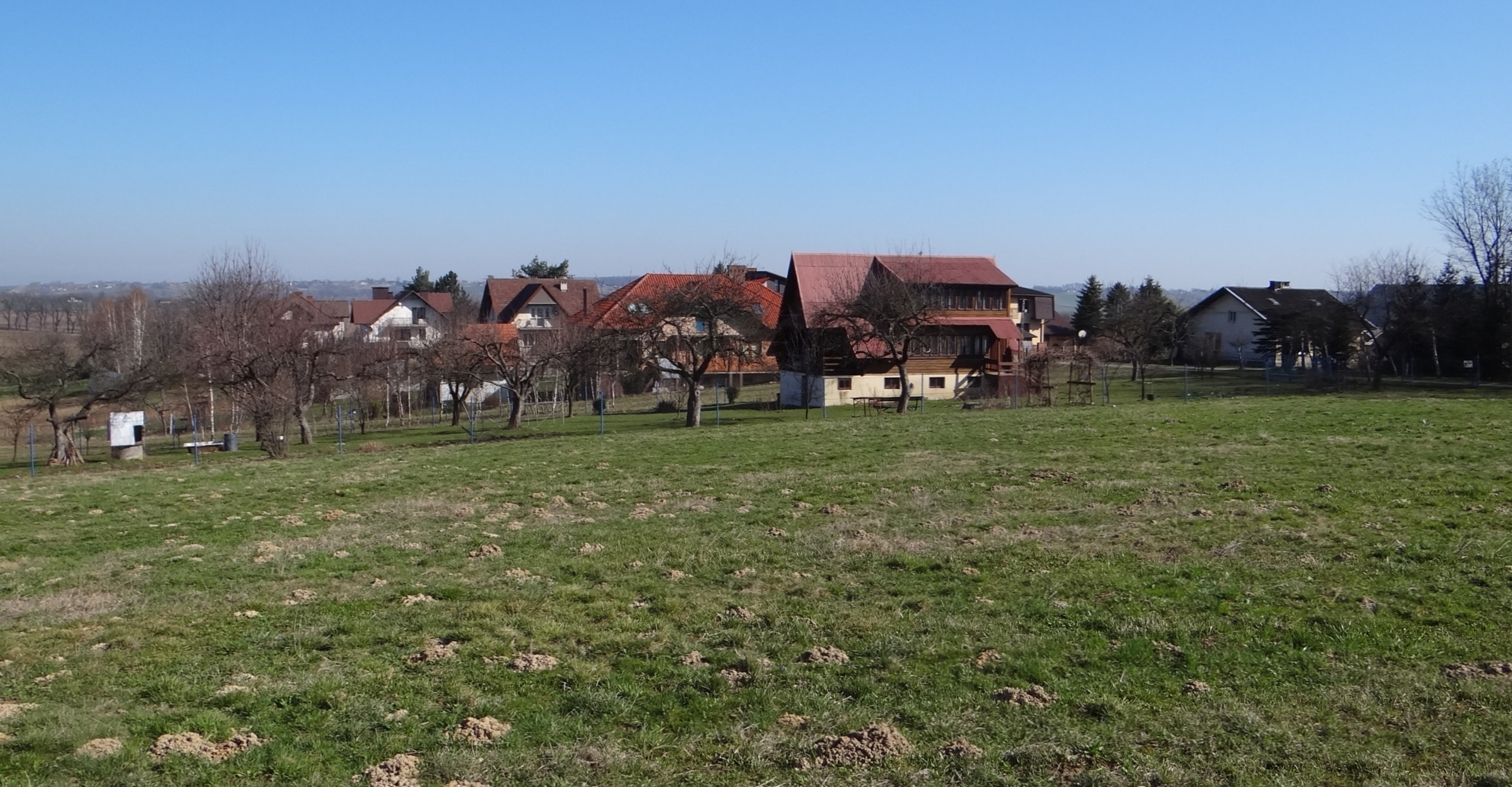

- Location within Poland
- Coordinates: 49°57′N 20°11′E
- Country: Poland
- Voivodeship: Lesser Poland
- County: Wieliczka
- Gmina: Biskupice

Jawczyce [jafˈt͡ʂɨt͡sɛ] is a village in the administrative district of Gmina Biskupice, within Wieliczka County, Lesser Poland Voivodeship, in southern Poland.

Mounds at Jawczyce were described by Bishop Nankerus in 1322. Kurgan mounds dated to the Neolithic or Bronze Age included a burial of an elderly person, probably male. Some weapons and pottery fragments were also found in the tomb.
