= Karolewo, Gmina Dominowo =

Karolewo
- Village
- Location within Poland
- Coordinates: 52°20′03″N 17°19′23″E
- Country: Poland
- Voivodeship: Greater Poland
- County: Środa
- Gmina: Dominowo

Karolewo [karɔˈlɛvɔ] is a village in the administrative district of Gmina Dominowo, within Środa County, Greater Poland Voivodeship, in west-central Poland.
