= Przebieczany =

- Village
- Location within Poland
- Coordinates: 49°59′N 20°7′E
- Country: Poland
- Voivodeship: Lesser Poland
- County: Wieliczka
- Gmina: Biskupice
- Highest elevation: 312 m (1,024 ft)
- Lowest elevation: 245 m (804 ft)
- Population: 1,055

Przebieczany [pʂɛbjɛˈt͡ʂanɨ] is a village in the administrative district of Gmina Biskupice, within Wieliczka County, Lesser Poland Voivodeship, in southern Poland.
