= Kopaszyce =

- Village
- Location within Poland
- Coordinates: 52°16′10″N 17°24′40″E
- Country: Poland
- Voivodeship: Greater Poland
- County: Środa
- Gmina: Dominowo

Kopaszyce [kɔpaˈʂɨt͡sɛ] is a village in the administrative district of Gmina Dominowo, within Środa County, Greater Poland Voivodeship, in west-central Poland.
