= Kościeliska =

Kościeliska Kostellitz
- Village
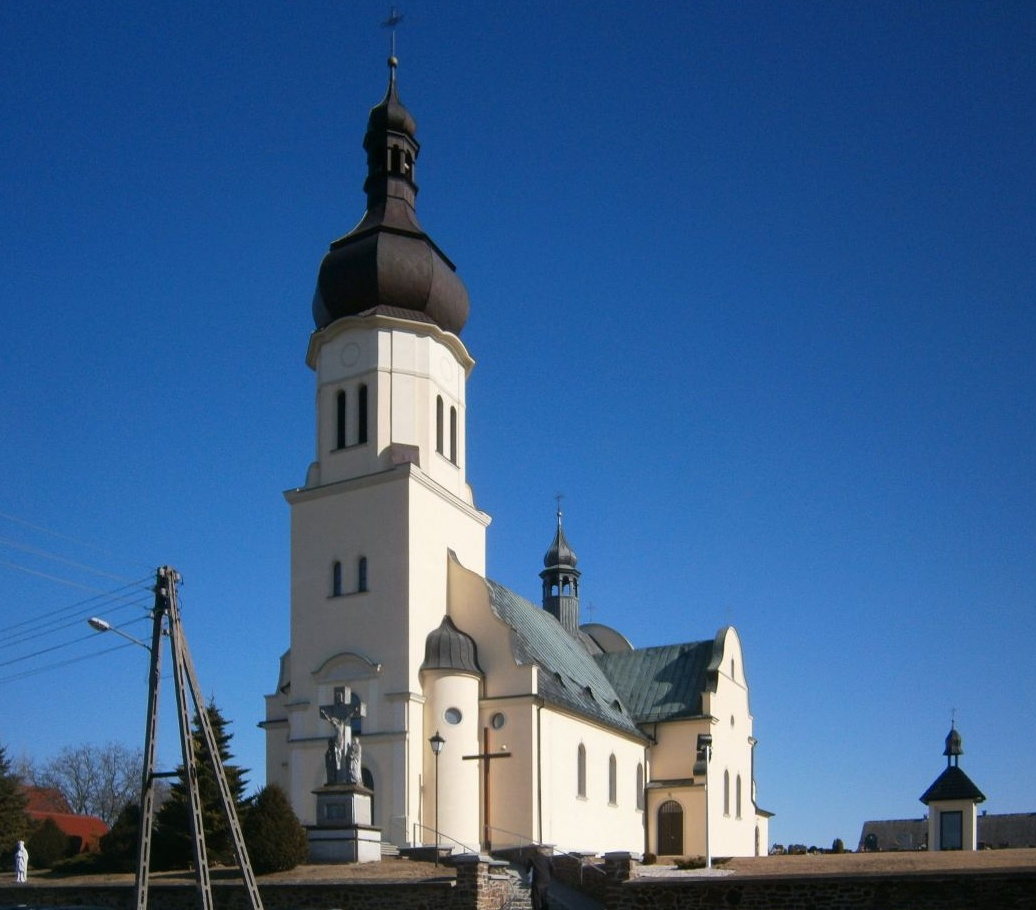
- Catholic church

- Location within Poland
- Coordinates: 50°59′N 18°30′E
- Country: Poland
- Voivodeship: Opole
- County: Olesno
- Gmina: Radłów

Population
  - Total: 737
- Time zone: UTC+1 (CET)
  - Summer (DST): UTC+2 (CEST)
- Vehicle registration: OOL

Kościeliska [kɔɕt͡ɕɛˈliska] is a village in the administrative district of Gmina Radłów, within Olesno County, Opole Voivodeship, in southern Poland.
