= Sabaszczewo =

- Village
- Location within Poland
- Coordinates: 52°14′35″N 17°25′37″E
- Country: Poland
- Voivodeship: Greater Poland
- County: Środa
- Gmina: Dominowo

Sabaszczewo [sabaʂˈt͡ʂɛvɔ] is a village in the administrative district of Gmina Dominowo, within Środa County, Greater Poland Voivodeship, in west-central Poland.
