= Trąbki, Lesser Poland Voivodeship =

Trąbki
- Village
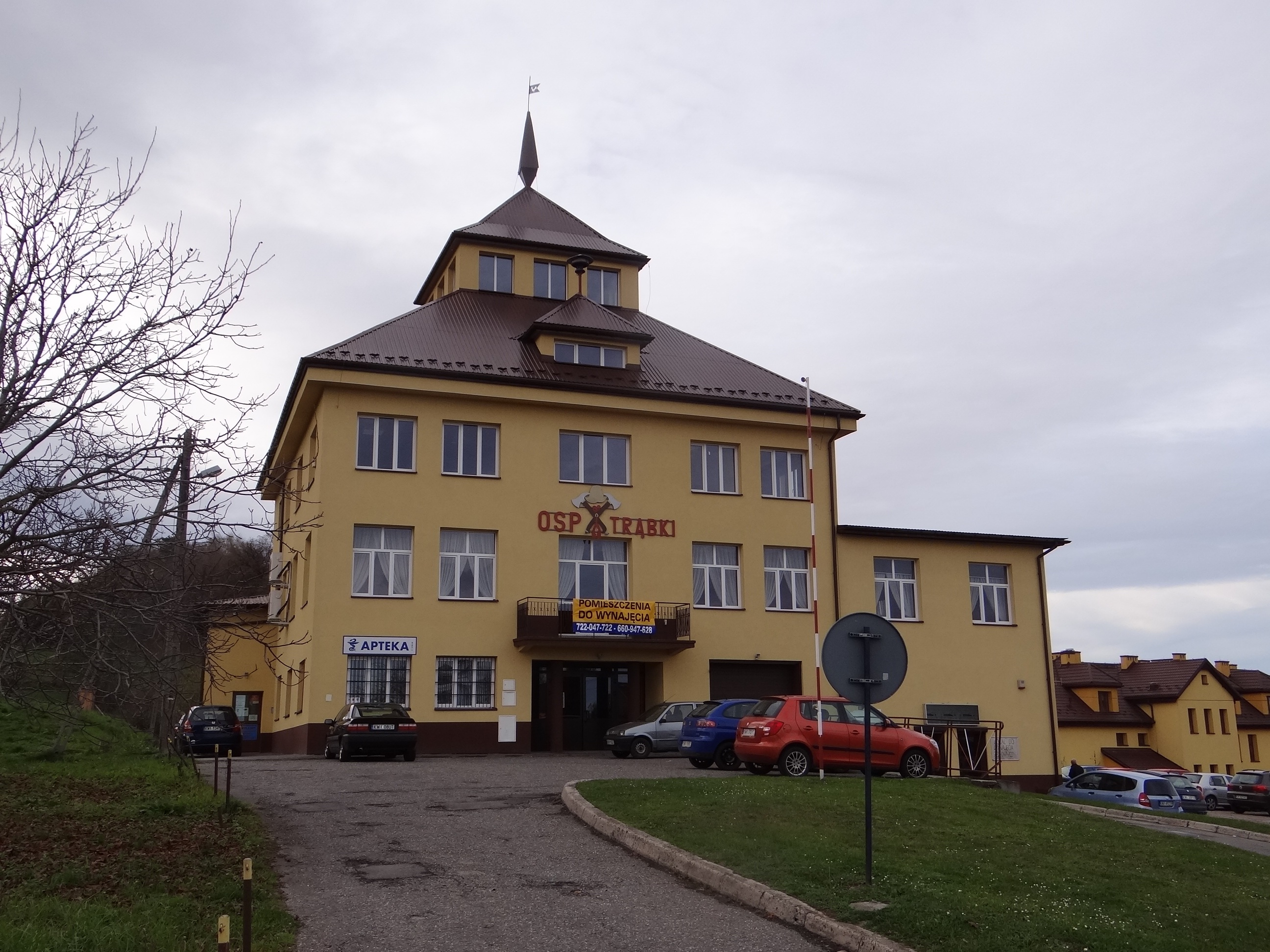
- Fire station

- Location within Poland
- Coordinates: 49°57′45″N 20°8′32″E
- Country: Poland
- Voivodeship: Lesser Poland
- County: Wieliczka
- Gmina: Biskupice

Trąbki [ˈtrɔmpki] is a village in Wieliczka County, Lesser Poland Voivodeship, in southern Poland. It is the seat of the gmina (administrative district) called Gmina Biskupice.
