= Chłapowo, Greater Poland Voivodeship =

Chłapowo
- Village
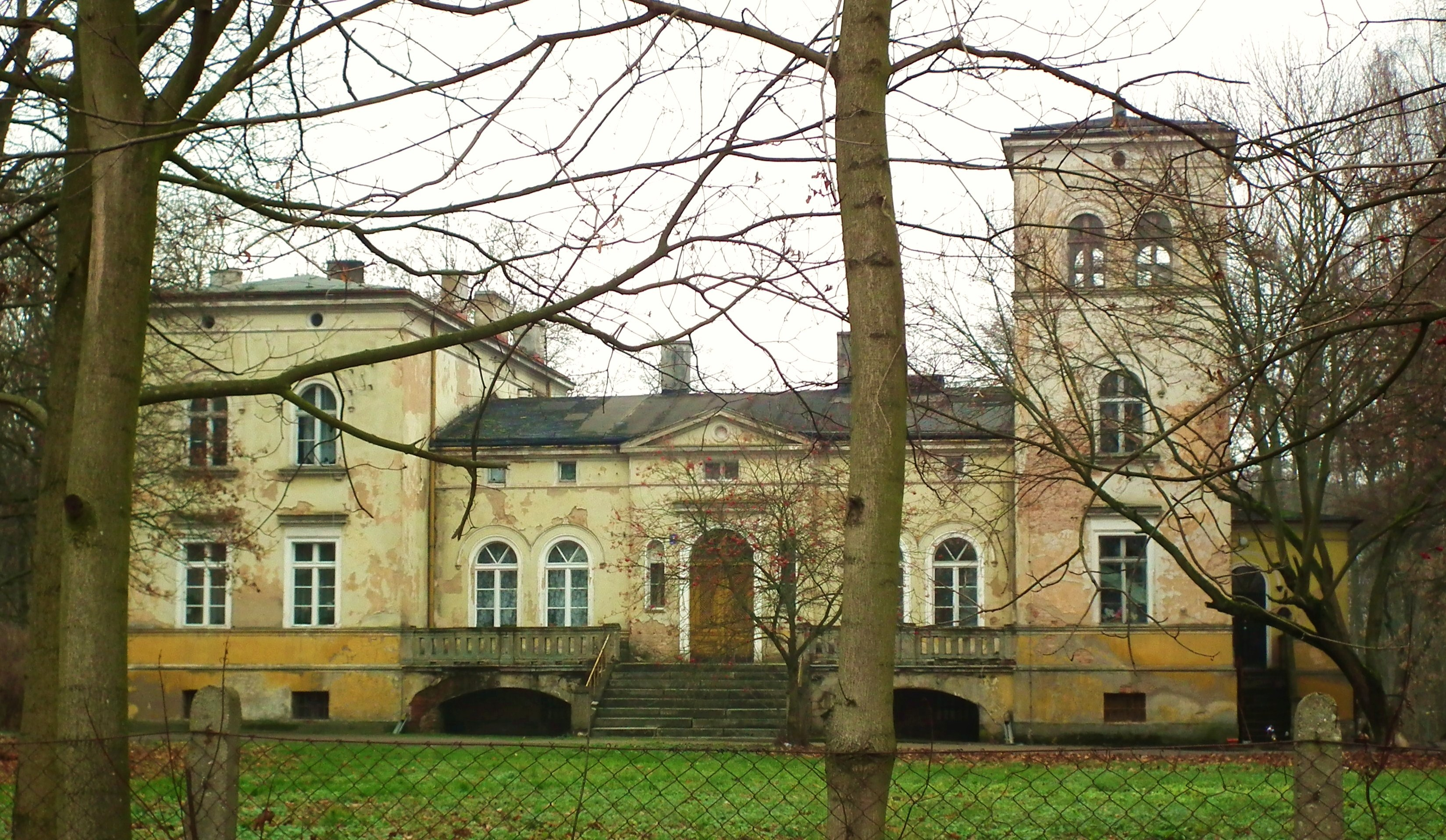
- Palace in Chłapowo

- Location within Poland
- Coordinates: 52°18′N 17°21′E
- Country: Poland
- Voivodeship: Greater Poland
- County: Środa
- Gmina: Dominowo
- Population: 150

Chłapowo [xwaˈpɔvɔ] is a village in the administrative district of Gmina Dominowo, within Środa County, Greater Poland Voivodeship, in west-central Poland.
