= Janowo, Gmina Dominowo =

Janowo
- Village
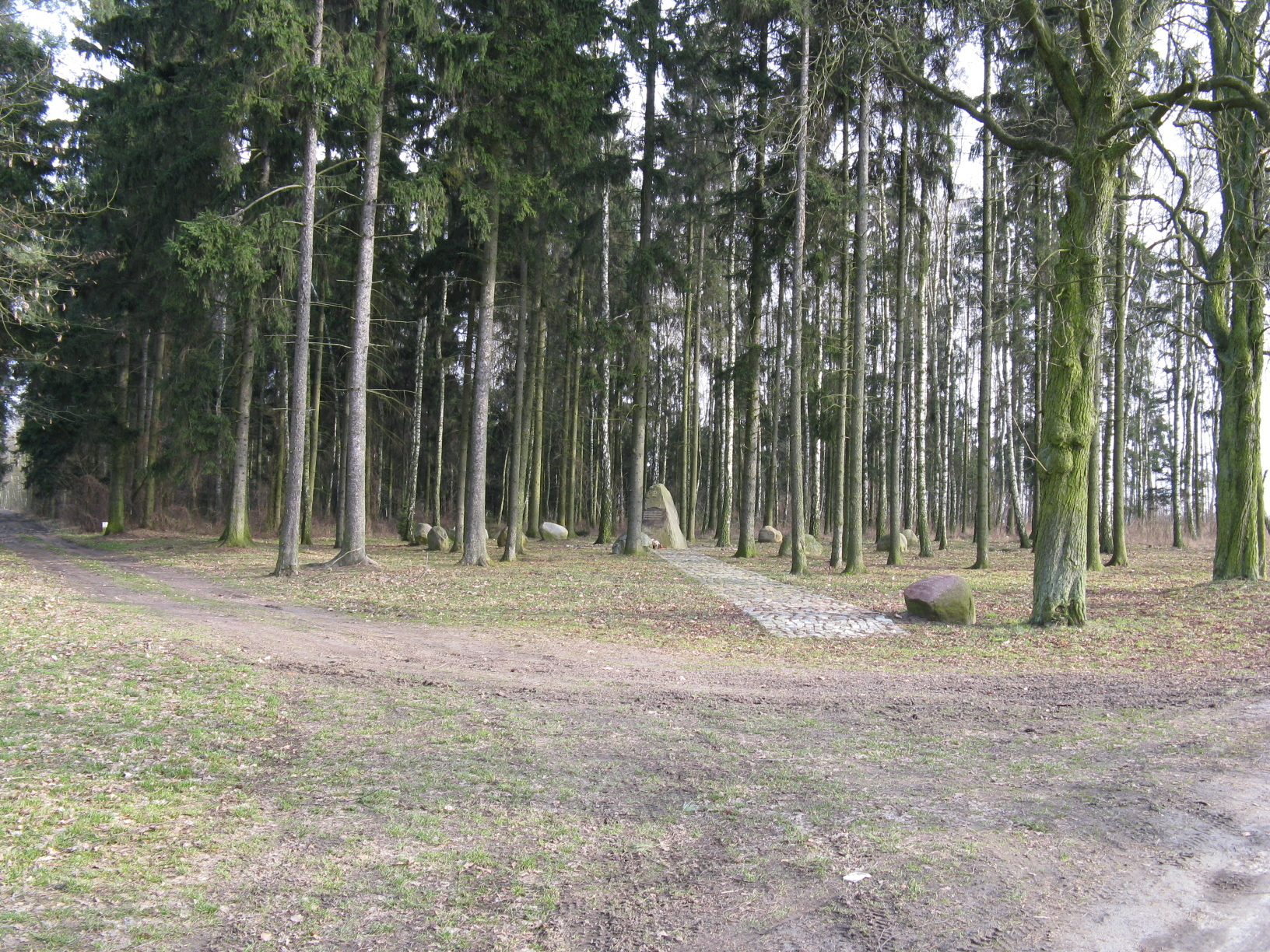
- Memorial site in Janowo

- Location within Poland
- Coordinates: 52°19′N 17°17′E
- Country: Poland
- Voivodeship: Greater Poland
- County: Środa
- Gmina: Dominowo

Janowo [jaˈnɔvɔ] is a village in the administrative district of Gmina Dominowo, within Środa County, Greater Poland Voivodeship, in west-central Poland.
