= Dominowo =

- Village
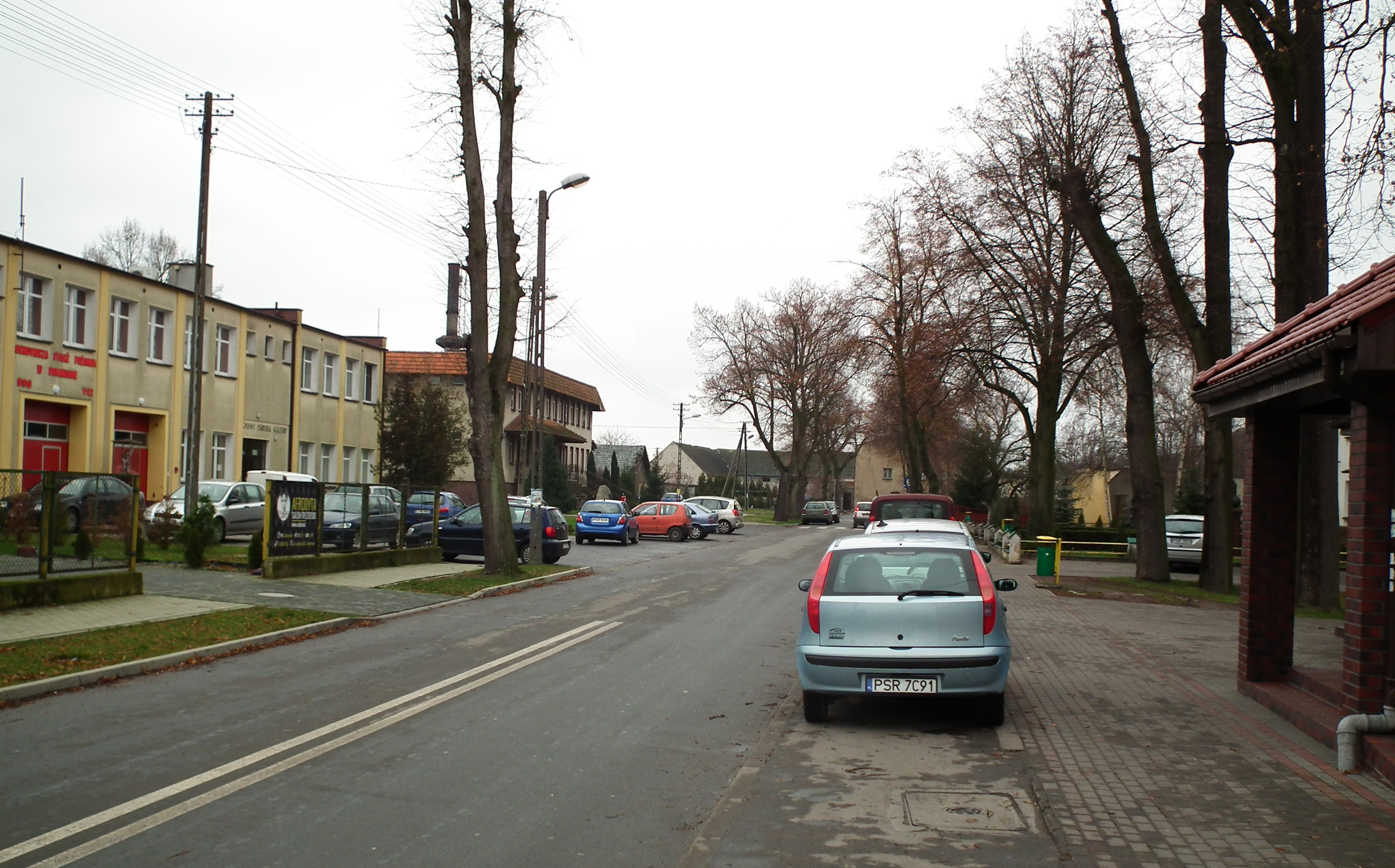
- Main street in Dominowo

- Location within Poland
- Coordinates: 52°17′N 17°21′E
- Country: Poland
- Voivodeship: Greater Poland
- County: Środa
- Gmina: Dominowo

Dominowo [dɔmiˈnɔvɔ] is a village in Środa County, Greater Poland Voivodeship, in west-central Poland. It is the seat of the gmina (administrative district) called Gmina Dominowo.
