= Sułów, Lesser Poland Voivodeship =

Sułów
- Village
- Location within Poland
- Coordinates: 49°57′N 20°8′E
- Country: Poland
- Voivodeship: Lesser Poland
- County: Wieliczka
- Gmina: Biskupice

Sułów [ˈsuwuf] is a village in the administrative district of Gmina Biskupice, within Wieliczka County, Lesser Poland Voivodeship, in southern Poland.
