= Biskupice, Lučenec District =

Village and municipality in Slovakia

Biskupice Fülekpüspöki
- Municipality
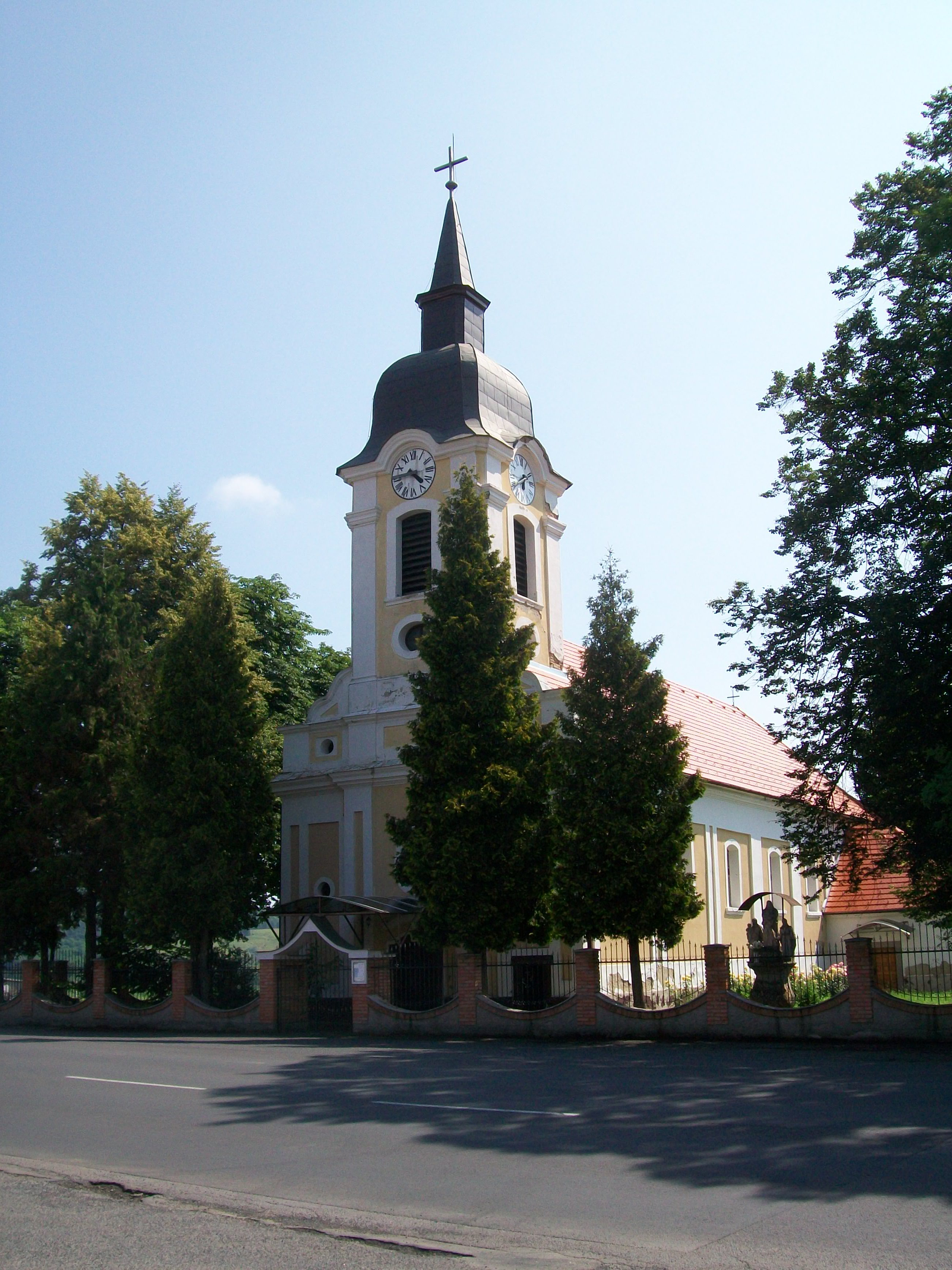
- Roman Catholic church in Biskupice

- Flag Coat of arms

- Location of Biskupice in the Banská Bystrica Region Location of Biskupice in Slovakia
- Coordinates: 48°15′10″N 19°50′7″E
- Country: Slovakia
- Region: Banská Bystrica Region
- District: Lučenec District
- First mentioned: 1294

Area
  - Total: 7.87 km^{2} (3.04 sq mi)
- Elevation: 209 m (686 ft)

Population (2025)
  - Total: 1,137
- Time zone: UTC+1 (CET)
  - Summer (DST): UTC+2 (CEST)
- Postal code: 986 01
- Area code: +421 47
- Vehicle registration plate (until 2022): LC
- Website: www.obecbiskupice.sk/index.php/sk/

Biskupice (before 1927 Pišpeky, 1773 Filakowska; Hungarian: Fülekpüspöki) is a village and municipality in the Lučenec District in the Banská Bystrica Region of Slovakia.

== History ==
The village arose in the 12th century; it was first mentioned in records in 1294, when it belonged to the Esztergom Archbishopric.

== Population ==
Population statistic (10 years)
Year	1995	2005	2015	2025
Count	1160	1134	1132	1137
Difference		−2.24%	−0.17%	+0.44%

Population statistic
Year	2024	2025
Count	1134	1137
Difference		+0.26%

It has a population of 1137 people (31 December 2025).

=== Ethnicity ===
Census 2021 (1+ %)
Ethnicity	Number	Fraction
Hungarian	835	73.43%
Slovak	263	23.13%
Not found out	96	8.44%
Romani	31	2.72%
Total	1137	

In year 2021 was 1137 people by ethnicity 835 as Hungarian, 263 as Slovak, 96 as Not found out, 31 as Romani, 2 as Czech, 2 as Ukrainian, 2 as Italian, 1 as Turkish, 1 as Russian and 1 as Other.

Note on population: The difference values of population numbers in the table "Population statistic" and in the sections "Ethnicity" & "Religion" is caused by the use of various statistical methods.

=== Religion ===
Census 2021 (1+ %)
Religion	Number	Fraction
Roman Catholic Church	873	76.78%
None	148	13.02%
Not found out	78	6.86%
Calvinist Church	12	1.06%
Total	1137	

In year 2021 was 1137 people by religion 873 from Roman Catholic Church, 148 from None, 78 from Not found out, 12 from Calvinist Church, 10 from Evangelical Church, 6 from Jehovah's Witnesses, 6 from Greek Catholic Church, 1 from Eastern Orthodox Church, 1 from Christian Congregations in Slovakia, 1 from Seventh-day Adventist Church and 1 from Ad hoc movements.

== Genealogical resources ==
The records for genealogical research are available at the state archive "Statny Archiv in Banska Bystrica, Slovakia"

- Roman Catholic church records (births/marriages/deaths): 1785-1897 (parish A)
- Greek Catholic church records (births/marriages/deaths): 1775-1928 (parish B)

== See also ==
- List of municipalities and towns in Slovakia
