= Gmina Radłów, Opole Voivodeship =

Gmina Radłów Gemeinde Radlau Radłów Commune
- Gmina
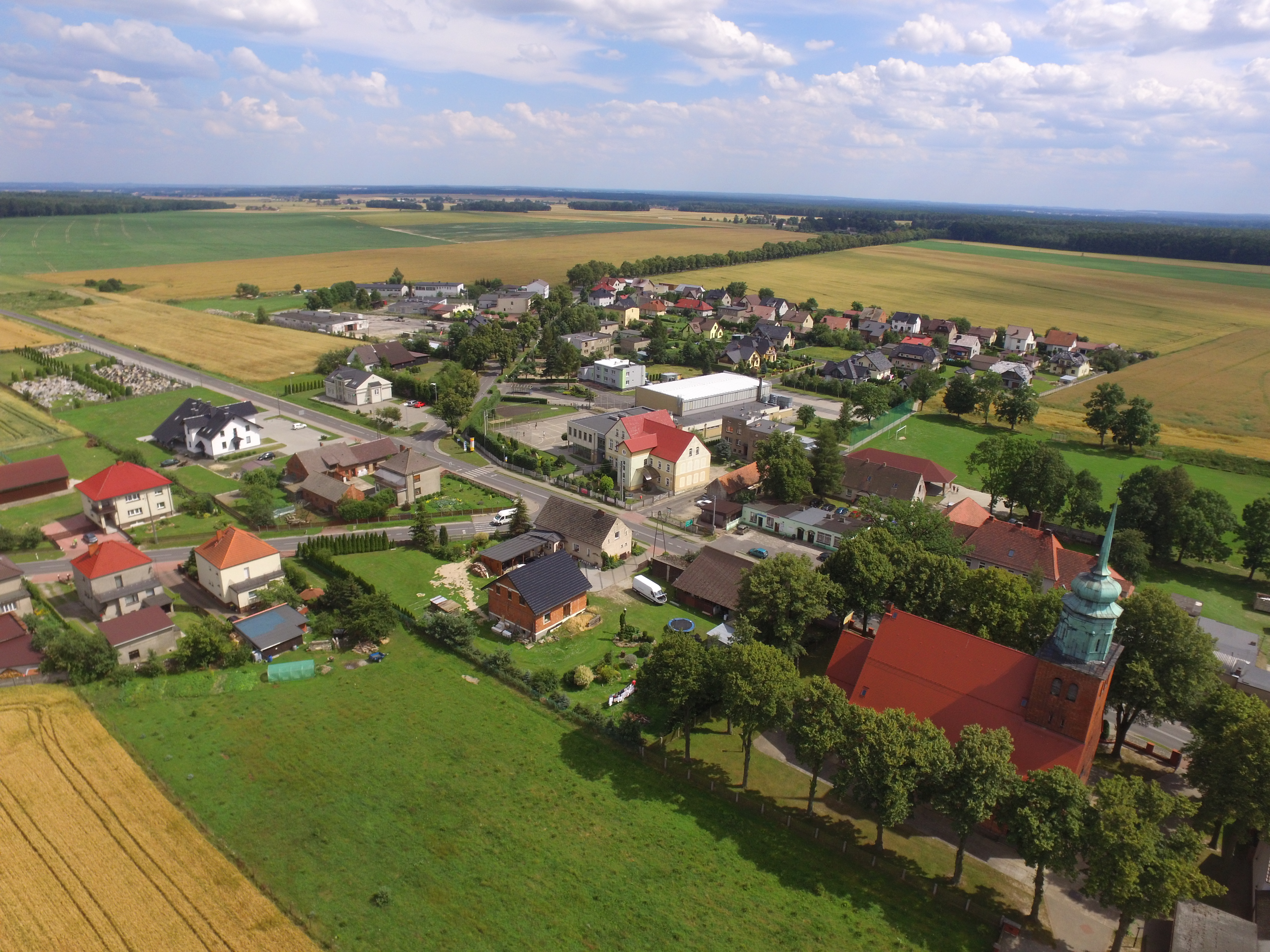
- Aerial view of Radłów, seat of the gmina

- Coat of arms
- Interactive map of Gmina Radłów
- Coordinates (Radłów): 50°56′N 18°32′E
- Country: Poland
- Voivodeship: Opole
- County: Olesno
- Seat: Radłów

Area
  - Total: 86.02 km^{2} (33.21 sq mi)

Population (2019-06-30)
  - Total: 4,308
  - Density: 50.08/km^{2} (129.7/sq mi)
- Time zone: UTC+1 (CET)
  - Summer (DST): UTC+2 (CEST)
- Vehicle registration: OOL
- Website: https://www.radlow.pl

Gmina Radłów (German: Gemeinde Radlau) is a rural gmina (administrative district) in Olesno County, Opole Voivodeship, in southern Poland. Its seat is the village of Radłów, which lies about 11 kilometres (7 mi) north-east of Olesno and 52 km (32 mi) north-east of the regional capital Opole.

The gmina covers an area of 86.02 square kilometres (33.2 sq mi), and as of 2019, its total population is 4,308.

In 2008, the district was the first in Poland to put up bilingual Polish and German signs for village names. As of 2008, 28% of the inhabitants were of German origin.

== Villages ==
The commune contains the villages and settlements of:

- Radłów
- Biskupice
- Biskupskie Drogi
- Kolonia Biskupska
- Kościeliska
- Ligota Oleska
- Nowe Karmonki
- Psurów
- Stare Karmonki
- Sternalice
- Wichrów
- Wolęcin

== Neighbouring gminas ==
Gmina Radłów is bordered by the gminas of Gorzów Śląski, Krzepice, Olesno, Praszka and Rudniki.
