= Biskupice (Prostějov District) =

- Municipality
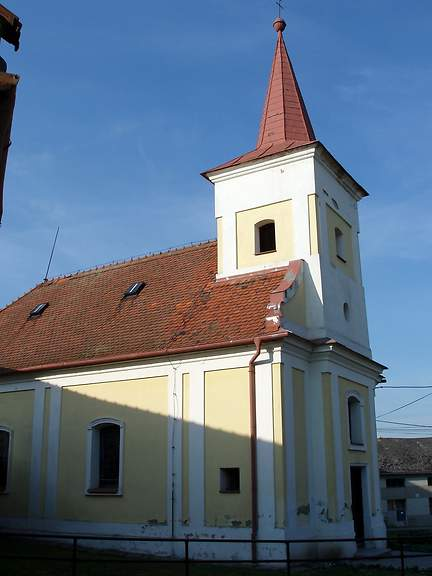
- Church of Saint Margaret

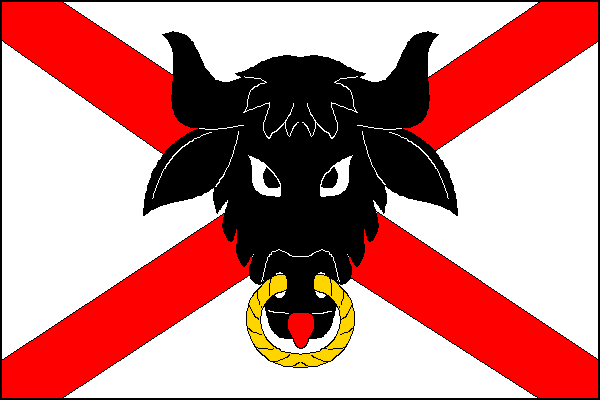
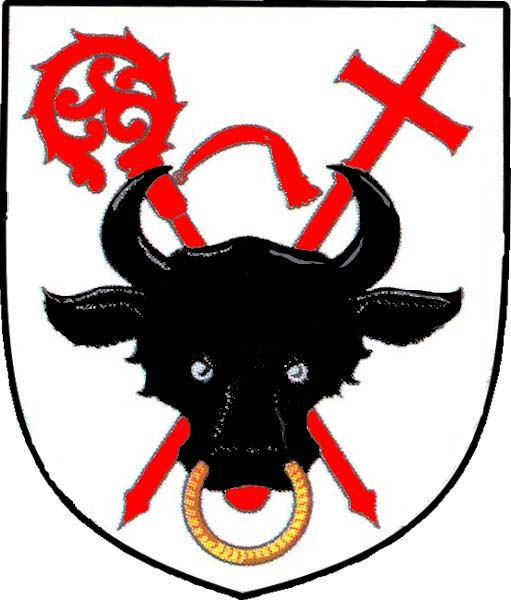
- Flag Coat of arms

- Location in the Czech Republic
- Coordinates: 49°27′35″N 17°14′12″E
- Country: Czech Republic
- Region: Olomouc
- District: Prostějov
- First mentioned: 1141

Area
  - Total: 4.14 km^{2} (1.60 sq mi)
- Elevation: 207 m (679 ft)

Population (2026-01-01)
  - Total: 317
  - Density: 76.6/km^{2} (198/sq mi)
- Time zone: UTC+1 (CET)
  - Summer (DST): UTC+2 (CEST)
- Postal code: 798 12
- Website: www.obecbiskupice.cz

Biskupice (German: Biskupitz) is a municipality and village in Prostějov District in the Olomouc Region of the Czech Republic. It has about 300 inhabitants.

Biskupice lies approximately 10 kilometres (6 mi) east of Prostějov, 15 km (9 mi) south of Olomouc, and 214 km (133 mi) east of Prague.

== Demographics ==
Historical population
Year	Pop.	±%
1869	316	—
1880	350	+10.8%
1890	372	+6.3%
1900	402	+8.1%
1910	356	−11.4%
1921	358	+0.6%
1930	355	−0.8%
1950	321	−9.6%
1961	308	−4.0%
1970	305	−1.0%
1980	293	−3.9%
1991	247	−15.7%
2001	248	+0.4%
2011	310	+25.0%
2021	292	−5.8%
Source: Censuses
