= Gmina Biskupice =

Gmina Biskupice Biskupice Commune
- Gmina
- Coat of arms
- Interactive map of Gmina Biskupice
- Coordinates (Tomaszkowice): 49°57′45″N 20°8′32″E
- Country: Poland
- Voivodeship: Lesser Poland
- County: Wieliczka
- Seat: Tomaszkowice

Area
  - Total: 41.0 km^{2} (15.8 sq mi)

Population (2006)
  - Total: 8,672
  - Density: 212/km^{2} (548/sq mi)
- Website: http://www.biskupice.pl/

Gmina Biskupice is a rural gmina (administrative district) in Wieliczka County, Lesser Poland Voivodeship, in southern Poland. It takes its name from the village of Biskupice, but its seat is the village of Tomaszkowice, which lies approximately 7 kilometres (4 mi) south-east of Wieliczka and 19 km (12 mi) south-east of the regional capital Kraków.

The gmina covers an area of 41.0 square kilometres (15.8 sq mi), and as of 2006 its total population is 8,672.

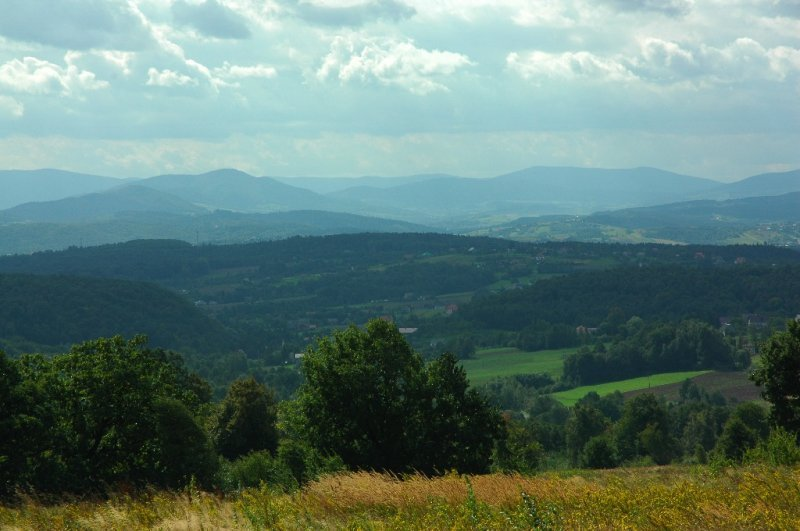
Gmina Biskupice view to the Beskids

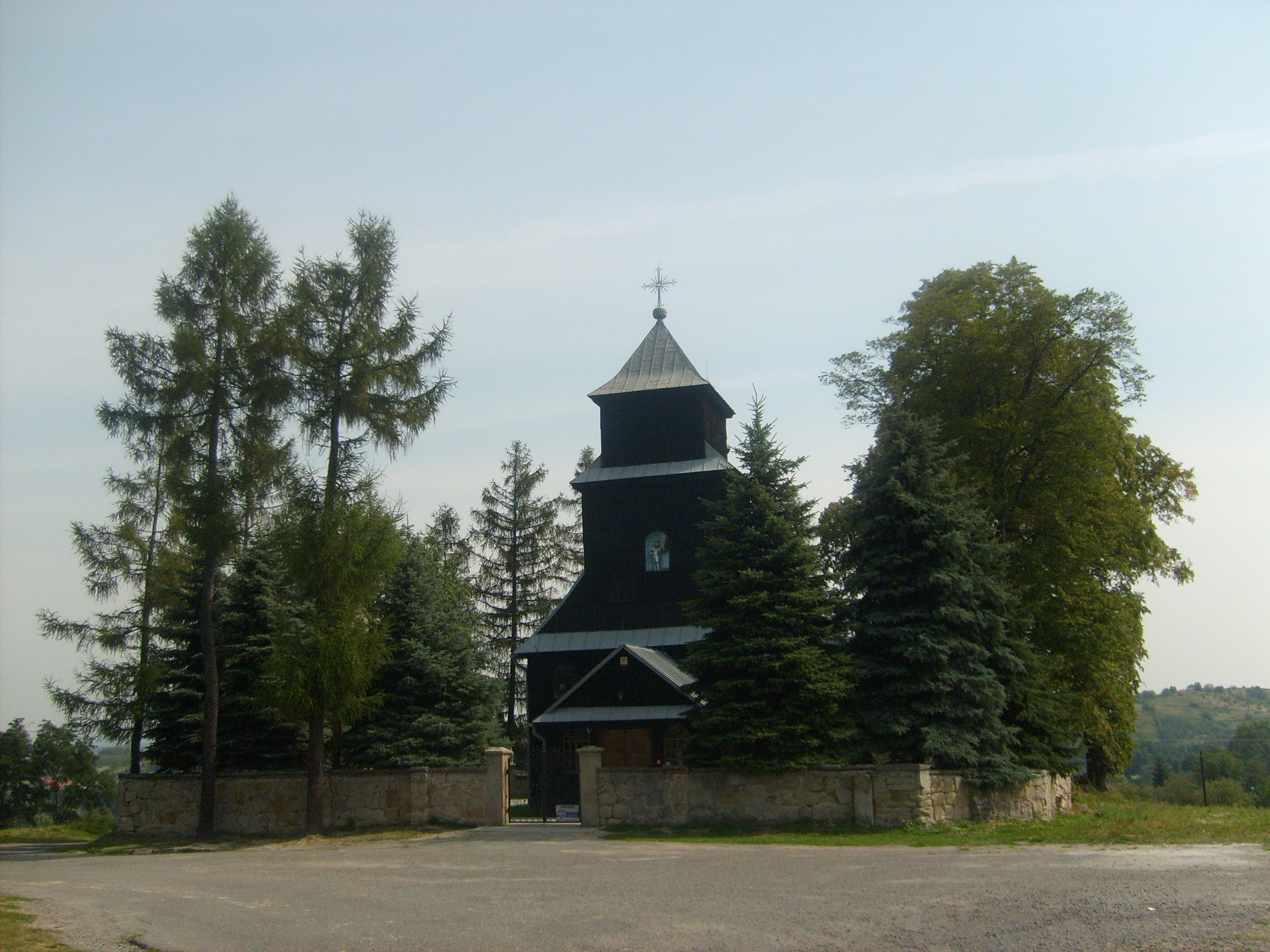
Church in the Bodzanów

== Villages ==
Gmina Biskupice contains the villages and settlements of Biskupice, Bodzanów, Jawczyce, Łazany, Przebieczany, Sławkowice, Sułów, Szczygłów, Tomaszkowice, Trąbki, Zabłocie and Zborówek.

== Neighbouring gminas ==
Gmina Biskupice is bordered by the gminas of Niepołomice and Wieliczka.

== Tourist attractions ==
- St. Peter and Paul church in the Bodzanów
- Church in the Biskupice
- Palace in Łazany
