= Biskupice, Olesno County =

Biskupice Bischdorf
- Village
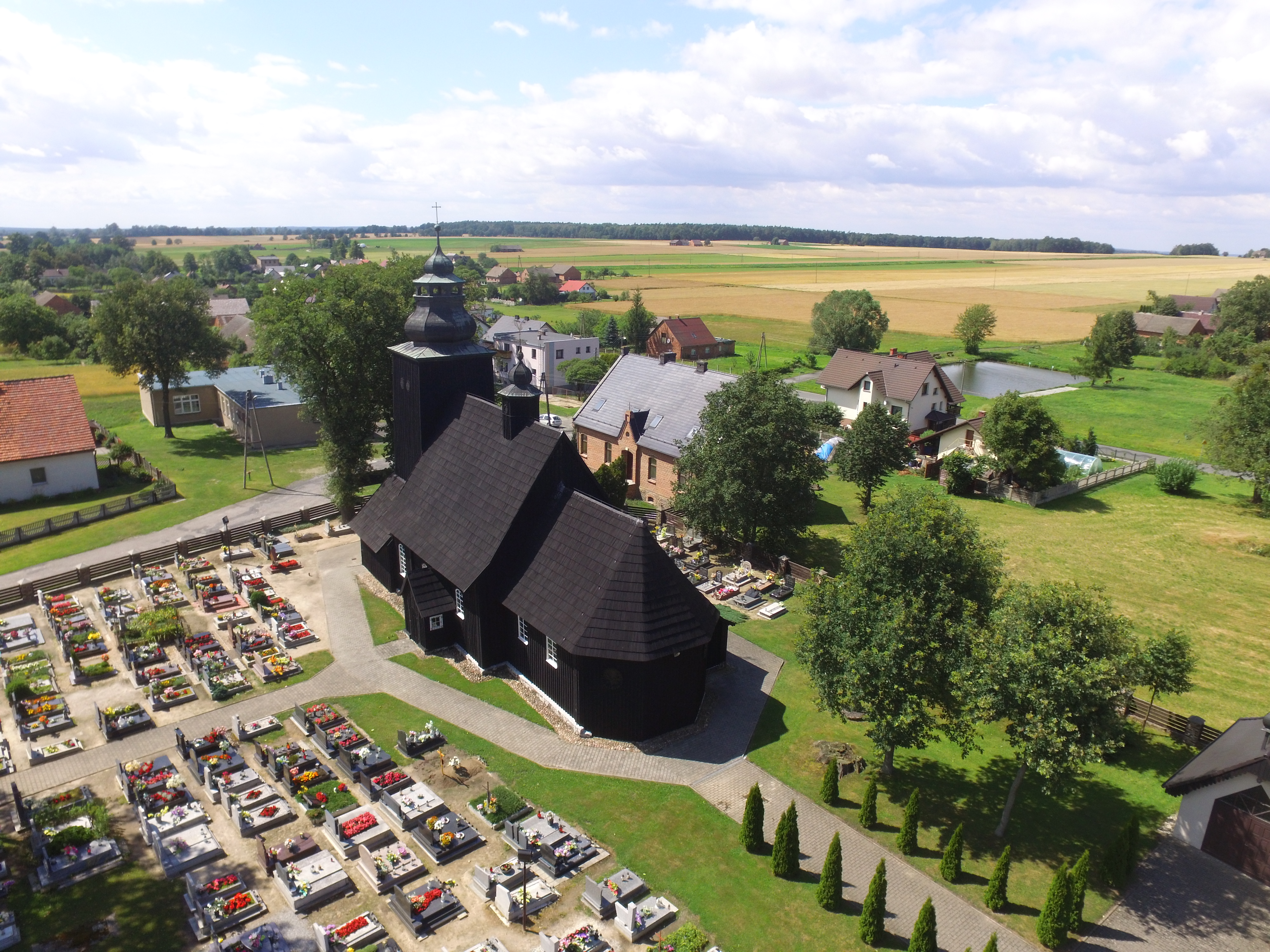

- Location within Poland
- Coordinates: 50°57′N 18°28′E
- Country: Poland
- Voivodeship: Opole
- County: Olesno
- Gmina: Radłów

Population
  - Total: 435
- Time zone: UTC+1 (CET)
  - Summer (DST): UTC+2 (CEST)
- Vehicle registration: OOL
- Website: https://web.archive.org/web/20101205050152/http://biskupice.mojeolesno.pl/

Biskupice ([biskuˈpit͡sɛ]) is a village in the administrative district of Gmina Radłów, within Olesno County, Opole Voivodeship, in southern Poland.
