= Bodzanów, Lesser Poland Voivodeship =

Bodzanów
- Village
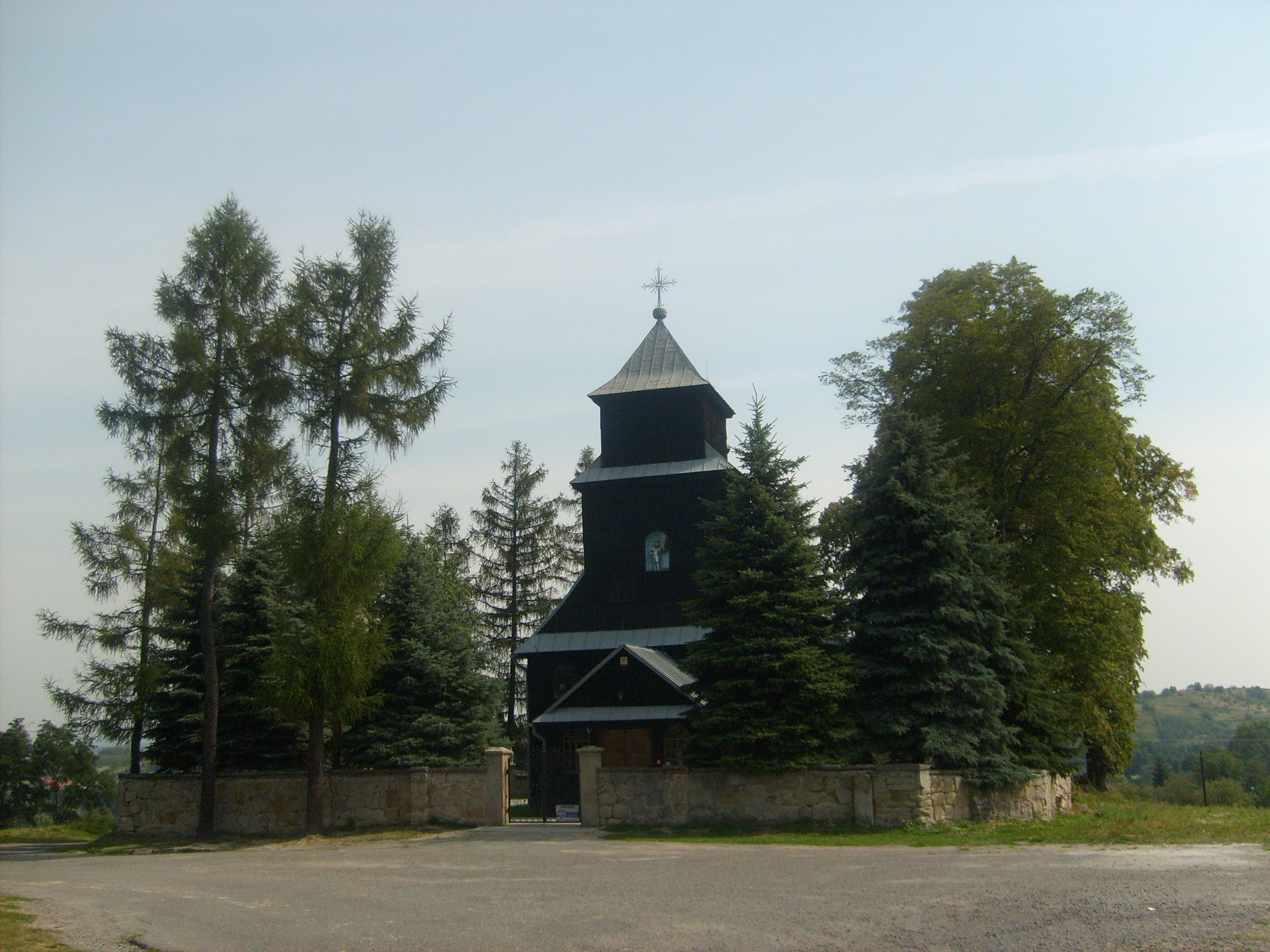
- Catholic church

- Location within Poland
- Coordinates: 49°59′N 20°9′E
- Country: Poland
- Voivodeship: Lesser Poland
- County: Wieliczka
- Gmina: Biskupice
- Population: 2,500

Bodzanów [bɔˈd͡zanuf] is a village in the administrative district of Gmina Biskupice, within Wieliczka County, Lesser Poland Voivodeship, in southern Poland.
