= Biskupice, Wieliczka County =

Biskupice
- Village
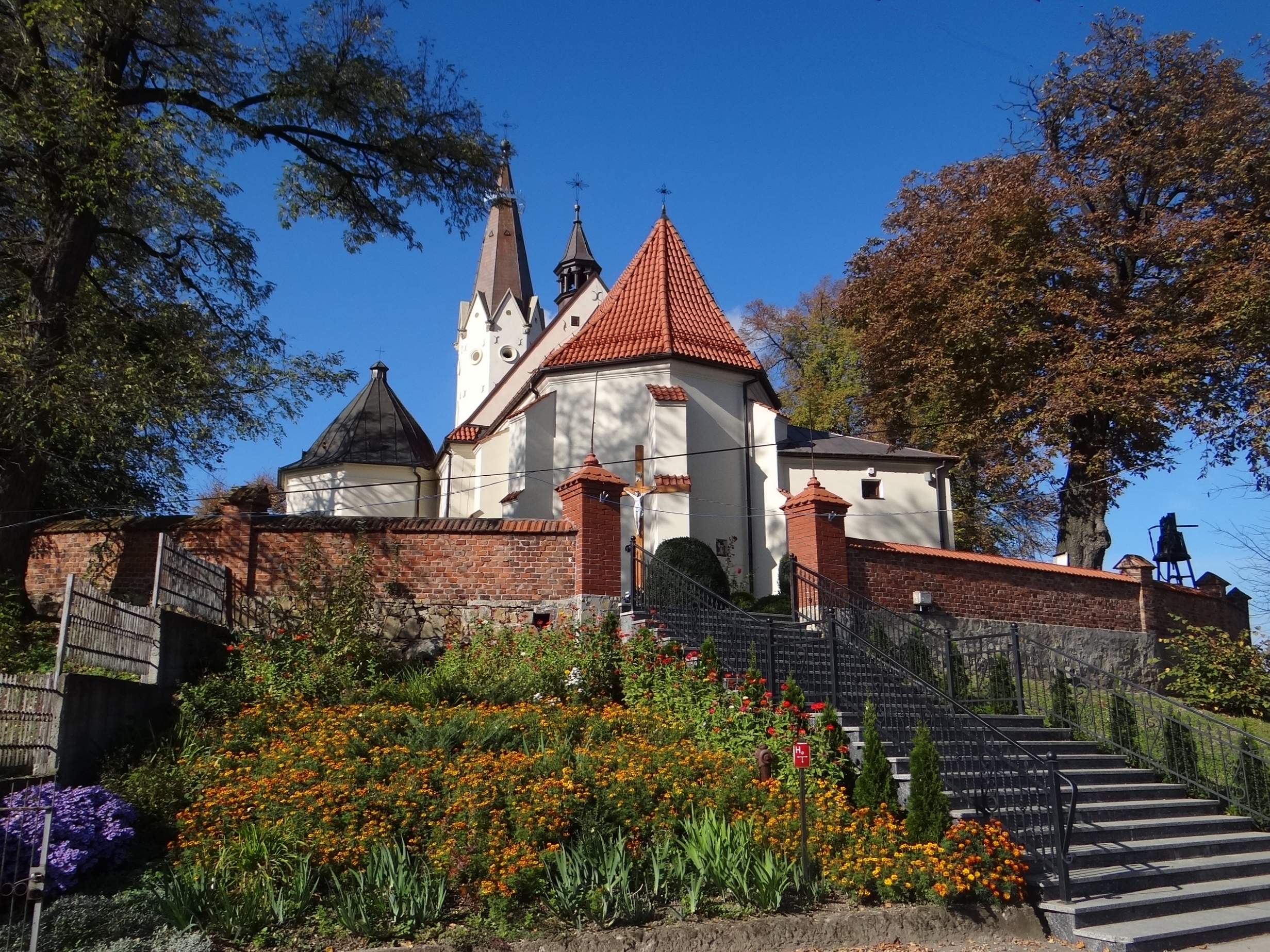
- Saint Martin Church

- Location within Poland
- Coordinates: 49°57′35″N 20°7′28″E
- Country: Poland
- Voivodeship: Lesser Poland
- County: Wieliczka
- Gmina: Biskupice
- Population: 890
- Website: http://www.biskupice.pl

Biskupice [biskuˈpit͡sɛ] is a village in the administrative district of Gmina Biskupice, within Wieliczka County, Lesser Poland Voivodeship, in southern Poland.
