= Biskupice (Zlín District) =

- Municipality
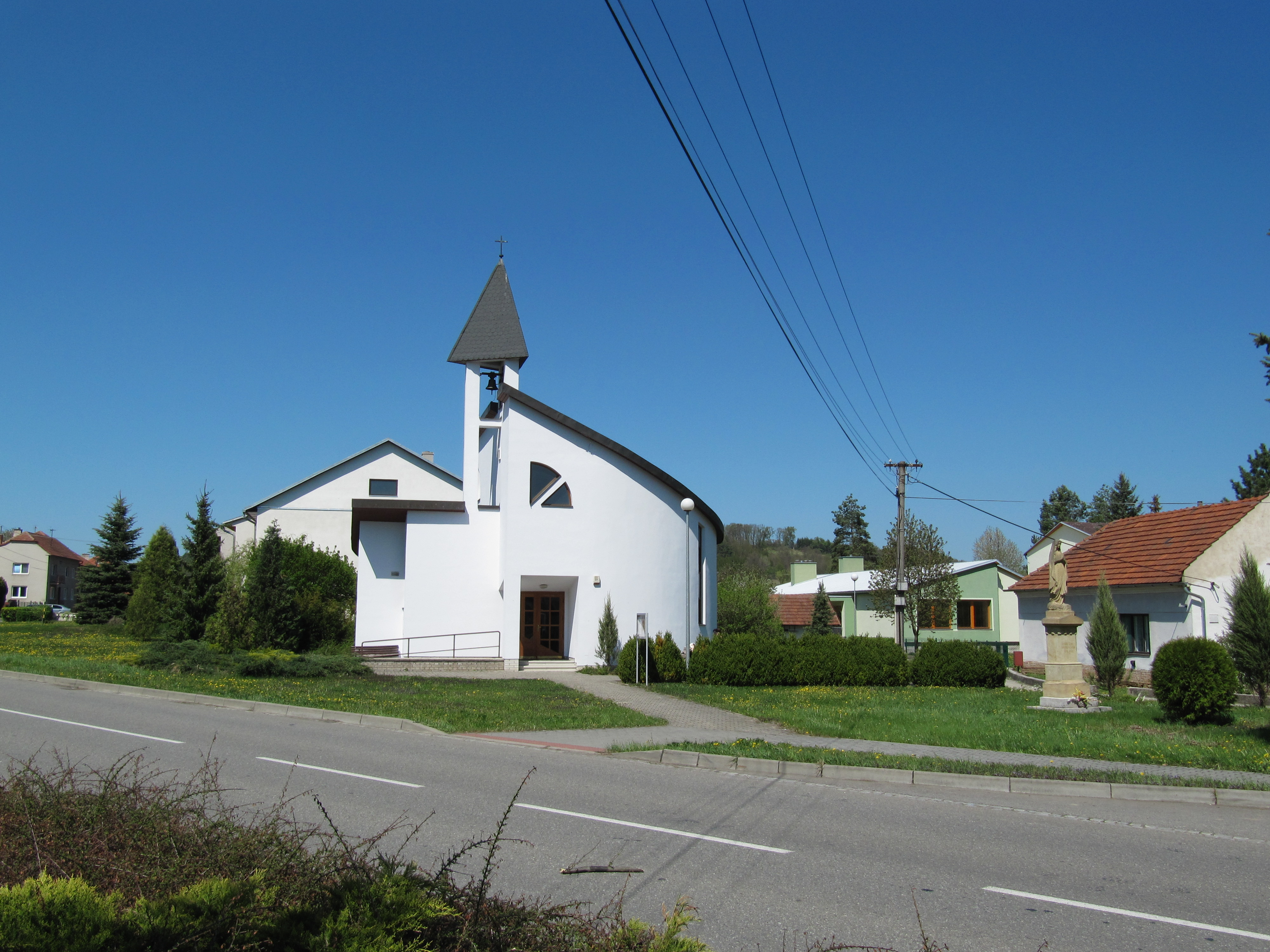
- Chapel of the Assumption of the Virgin Mary

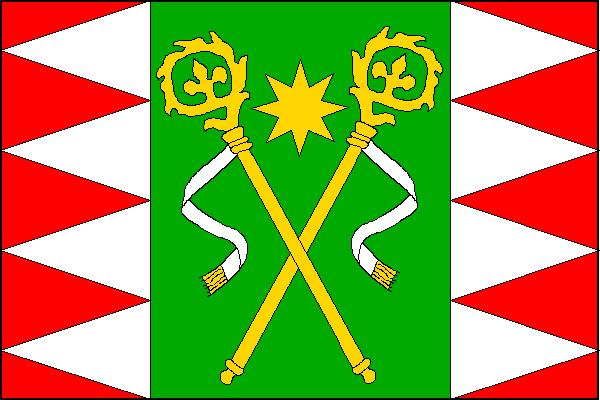
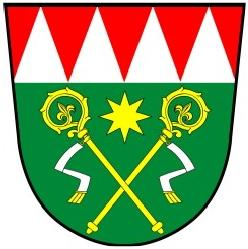
- Flag Coat of arms

- Location in the Czech Republic
- Coordinates: 49°4′59″N 17°42′38″E
- Country: Czech Republic
- Region: Zlín
- District: Zlín
- First mentioned: 1131

Area
  - Total: 5.97 km^{2} (2.31 sq mi)
- Elevation: 235 m (771 ft)

Population (2026-01-01)
  - Total: 685
  - Density: 115/km^{2} (297/sq mi)
- Time zone: UTC+1 (CET)
  - Summer (DST): UTC+2 (CEST)
- Postal code: 763 41
- Website: www.biskupiceuluhacovic.cz

Biskupice is a municipality and village in Zlín District in the Zlín Region of the Czech Republic. It has about 700 inhabitants.

Biskupice lies approximately 17 kilometres (11 mi) south of Zlín and 263 km (163 mi) south-east of Prague.

== Demographics ==
Historical population
Year	Pop.	±%
1869	316	—
1880	335	+6.0%
1890	348	+3.9%
1900	357	+2.6%
1910	397	+11.2%
1921	386	−2.8%
1930	462	+19.7%
1950	541	+17.1%
1961	584	+7.9%
1970	577	−1.2%
1980	635	+10.1%
1991	684	+7.7%
2001	728	+6.4%
2011	672	−7.7%
2021	646	−3.9%
Source: Censuses

== Notable people ==
- Milan Máčala (born 1943), football manager
