= Biskupice, Gmina Dominowo =

Biskupice
- Village
- Location within Poland
- Coordinates: 52°20′13″N 17°22′09″E
- Country: Poland
- Voivodeship: Greater Poland
- County: Środa
- Gmina: Dominowo

Biskupice [biskuˈpit͡sɛ] is a village in the administrative district of Gmina Dominowo, within Środa County, Greater Poland Voivodeship, in west-central Poland.
