= Orzeszkowo, Gmina Dominowo =

Orzeszkowo
- Village
- Location within Poland
- Coordinates: 52°17′20″N 17°22′54″E
- Country: Poland
- Voivodeship: Greater Poland
- County: Środa
- Gmina: Dominowo

Orzeszkowo [ɔʐɛʂˈkɔvɔ] is a village in the administrative district of Gmina Dominowo, within Środa County, Greater Poland Voivodeship, in west-central Poland.
