= Biskupice (Chrudim District) =

- Municipality
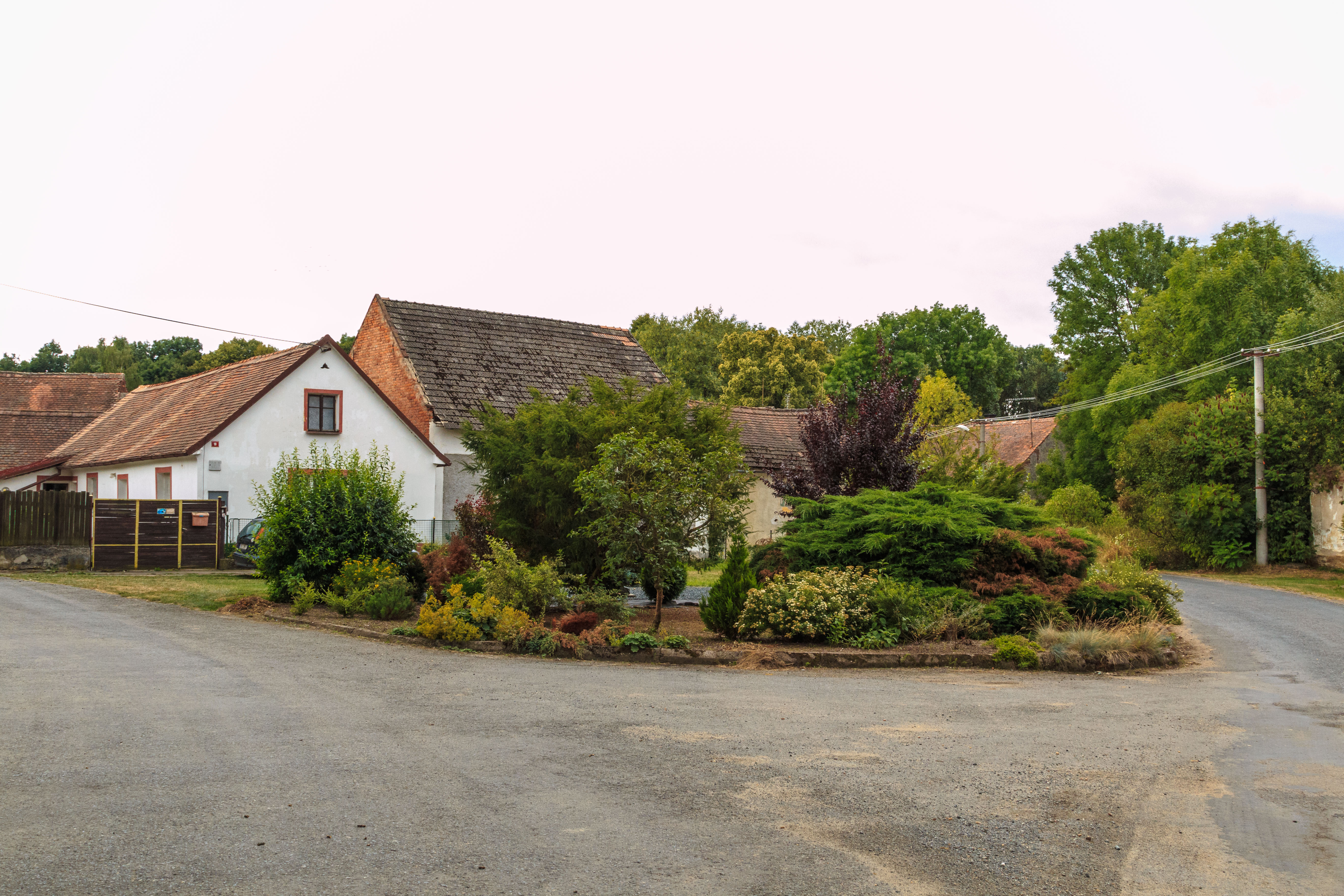
- House No. 18

- Location in the Czech Republic
- Coordinates: 49°52′22″N 15°30′46″E
- Country: Czech Republic
- Region: Pardubice
- District: Chrudim
- First mentioned: 1352

Area
  - Total: 2.74 km^{2} (1.06 sq mi)
- Elevation: 284 m (932 ft)

Population (2026-01-01)
  - Total: 78
  - Density: 28/km^{2} (74/sq mi)
- Time zone: UTC+1 (CET)
  - Summer (DST): UTC+2 (CEST)
- Postal code: 538 43
- Website: www.obecbiskupice.eu

Biskupice is a municipality and village in Chrudim District in the Pardubice Region of the Czech Republic. It has about 80 inhabitants.

== Demographics ==
Historical population
Year	Pop.	±%
1869	201	—
1880	223	+10.9%
1890	231	+3.6%
1900	189	−18.2%
1910	200	+5.8%
1921	241	+20.5%
1930	231	−4.1%
1950	167	−27.7%
1961	144	−13.8%
1970	114	−20.8%
1980	76	−33.3%
1991	51	−32.9%
2001	52	+2.0%
2011	51	−1.9%
2021	79	+54.9%
Source: Censuses
