= Biskupice-Pulkov =

- Municipality
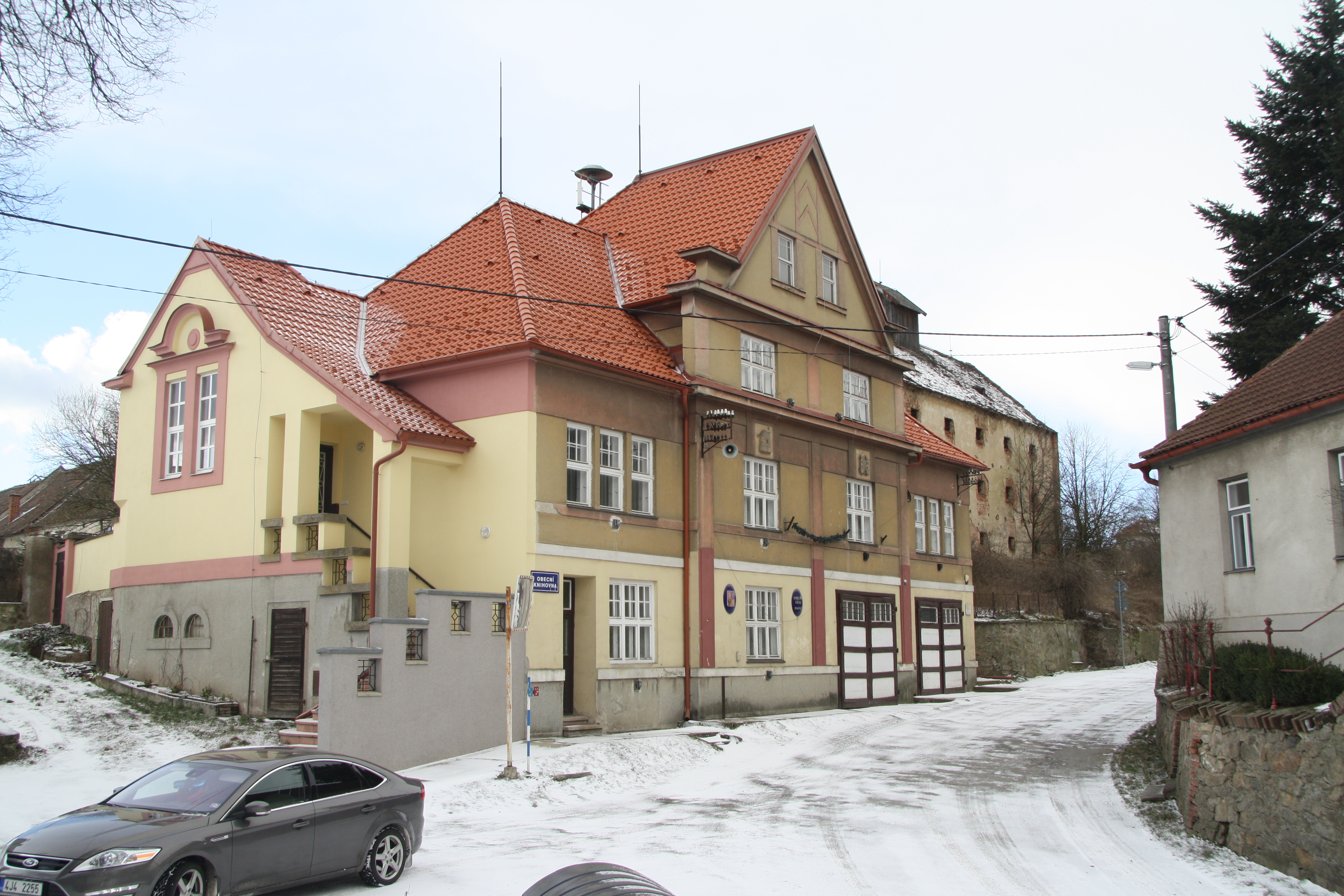
- Municipal office

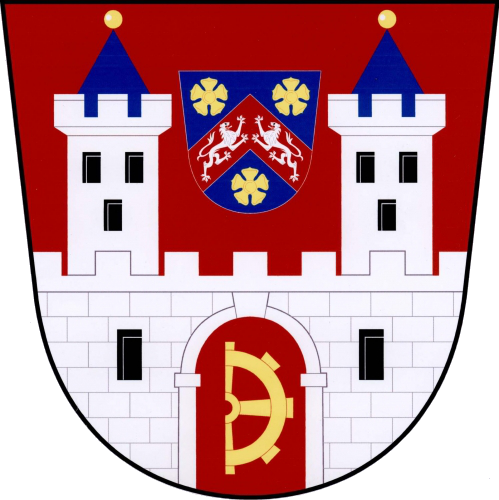
- Flag Coat of arms

- Location in the Czech Republic
- Coordinates: 49°2′16″N 16°0′40″E
- Country: Czech Republic
- Region: Vysočina
- District: Třebíč
- First mentioned: 1131

Area
  - Total: 11.84 km^{2} (4.57 sq mi)
- Elevation: 375 m (1,230 ft)

Population (2026-01-01)
  - Total: 256
  - Density: 21.6/km^{2} (56.0/sq mi)
- Time zone: UTC+1 (CET)
  - Summer (DST): UTC+2 (CEST)
- Postal code: 675 58
- Website: www.biskupice-pulkov.cz

Biskupice-Pulkov (German: Biskupitz-Pulkau) is a municipality in Třebíč District in the Vysočina Region of the Czech Republic. It has about 300 inhabitants.

Biskupice-Pulkov lies approximately 23 kilometres (14 mi) south-east of Třebíč, 51 km (32 mi) south-east of Jihlava, and 164 km (102 mi) south-east of Prague.

== Administrative division ==
Biskupice-Pulkov consists of two municipal parts (in brackets population according to the 2021 census):

- Biskupice (214)
- Pulkov (46)

== Demographics ==
Historical population
Year	Pop.	±%
1869	710	—
1880	761	+7.2%
1890	728	−4.3%
1900	762	+4.7%
1910	755	−0.9%
1921	759	+0.5%
1930	789	+4.0%
1950	661	−16.2%
1961	598	−9.5%
1970	495	−17.2%
1980	392	−20.8%
1991	348	−11.2%
2001	309	−11.2%
2011	268	−13.3%
2021	260	−3.0%
Source: Censuses
