= Zabłocie, Lesser Poland Voivodeship =

Zabłocie
- Village
- Location within Poland
- Coordinates: 49°58′N 20°11′E
- Country: Poland
- Voivodeship: Lesser Poland
- County: Wieliczka
- Gmina: Biskupice

Zabłocie [zaˈbwɔt͡ɕɛ] is a village in the administrative district of Gmina Biskupice, within Wieliczka County, Lesser Poland Voivodeship, in southern Poland.
