= Zaborowo =

Zaborowo may refer to the following places:

- Zaborowo, Brodnica County in Kuyavian-Pomeranian Voivodeship (north-central Poland)
- Zaborowo, Inowrocław County in Kuyavian-Pomeranian Voivodeship (north-central Poland)
- Zaborowo, Grajewo County in Podlaskie Voivodeship (north-east Poland)
- Zaborowo, Kolno County in Podlaskie Voivodeship (north-east Poland)
- Zaborowo, Masovian Voivodeship (east-central Poland)
- Zaborowo, Konin County in Greater Poland Voivodeship (west-central Poland)
- Zaborowo, Rawicz County in Greater Poland Voivodeship (west-central Poland)
- Zaborowo, Śrem County in Greater Poland Voivodeship (west-central Poland)
- Zaborowo, Ełk County in Warmian-Masurian Voivodeship (north Poland)
- Zaborowo, Gmina Janowiec Kościelny in Warmian-Masurian Voivodeship (north Poland)
- Zaborowo, Gmina Kozłowo in Warmian-Masurian Voivodeship (north Poland)
- Zaborowo, Olsztyn County in Warmian-Masurian Voivodeship (north Poland)
