= Kębłowice =

Kębłowice may refer to the following places in Poland:

- Kębłowice, Lower Silesian Voivodeship (south-west Poland)
- Kębłowice, Masovian Voivodeship (east-central Poland)
