= Stachowo =

Stachowo may refer to the following places in Poland:

- Stachowo, Piaseczno County in Masovian Voivodeship (east-central Poland)
- Stachowo, Płońsk County in Masovian Voivodeship (east-central Poland)
- Stachowo, Pomeranian Voivodeship (north Poland)
