= Zakrzewo =

Zakrzewo may refer to:

- Zakrzewo, Złotów County in Greater Poland Voivodeship (west-central Poland)
- Zakrzewo, Gmina Waganiec in Kuyavian-Pomeranian Voivodeship (north-central Poland)
- Zakrzewo, Gmina Zakrzewo in Kuyavian-Pomeranian Voivodeship (central Poland)
- Zakrzewo, Chełmno County in Kuyavian-Pomeranian Voivodeship (north-central Poland)
- Zakrzewo, Grudziądz County in Kuyavian-Pomeranian Voivodeship (north-central Poland)
- Zakrzewo, Lipno County in Kuyavian-Pomeranian Voivodeship (north-central Poland)
- Zakrzewo, Gmina Baruchowo in Kuyavian-Pomeranian Voivodeship (central Poland)
- Zakrzewo, Gmina Lubień Kujawski in Kuyavian-Pomeranian Voivodeship (central Poland)
- Zakrzewo, Bielsk County in Podlaskie Voivodeship (north-east Poland)
- Zakrzewo, Grajewo County in Podlaskie Voivodeship (north-east Poland)
- Zakrzewo, Maków County in Masovian Voivodeship (east-central Poland)
- Zakrzewo, Płock County in Masovian Voivodeship (central Poland)
- Zakrzewo, Gniezno County in Greater Poland Voivodeship (west-central Poland)
- Zakrzewo, Koło County in Greater Poland Voivodeship (central Poland)
- Zakrzewo, Poznań County in Greater Poland Voivodeship (west-central Poland)
- Zakrzewo, Rawicz County in Greater Poland Voivodeship (west-central Poland)
- Zakrzewo, Wągrowiec County in Greater Poland Voivodeship (west-central Poland)
- Zakrzewo, Wolsztyn County in Greater Poland Voivodeship (west-central Poland)
- Zakrzewo, Śrem County in Greater Poland Voivodeship (west-central Poland)
- Zakrzewo, Pomeranian Voivodeship (north Poland)
- Zakrzewo, Działdowo County in Warmian-Masurian Voivodeship (north Poland)
- Zakrzewo, Nidzica County in Warmian-Masurian Voivodeship (north Poland)
- Zakrzewo, West Pomeranian Voivodeship (north-west Poland)
