= Stanisław Sołtyk =

Polish nobleman (szlachcic), political activist and landowner

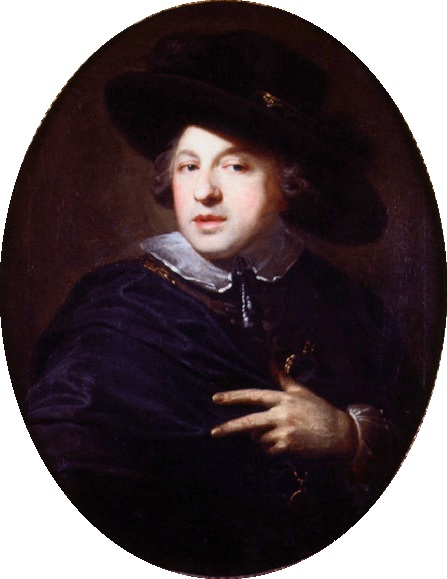
- Portriat of Sołtyk by Josef Grassi, c. 1788
- Born: 16 December 1752; Krysk, Greater Poland Province, Polish–Lithuanian Commonwealth
- Died: 4 June 1833 (aged 80); Warsaw, Masovian Voivodeship, Congress Poland
- Children: Roman Sołtyk

Stanisław Sołtyk (16 December 1752 – 4 June 1833) was a Polish nobleman (szlachcic), political activist, landowner, father of Roman Sołtyk.

== Biography ==
Sołtyk was born in Krysk, Płock Voivodeship. He became Royal chamberlain in 1780, Great Podstoli of the Crown in 1784. He was a strong supporter of reforms in the Republic. He participated in the Great Sejm in 1788–1792 as representative of the Kraków Voivodeship for the second time. He was a member of the Radziwill Club, which prepared the passing of the Constitution of 3 May 1791 by the Sejm. After the adoption of the Constitution, he became member and co-founder of the Assembly of Friends of the 3 May Constitution. Reportedly, he was the last known inhabitant of the Krzyżtopór castle complex, living there in the years 1782-1787.

Sołtyk participated in the preparation of the Kościuszko Uprising, but did not partake in any armed struggles. He was sent with a secret diplomatic mission to the royal court in Vienna, but was arrested by the Austrian authorities. During the partition of Poland, he supported and was involved in conspiratorial activities of the independence movements.

After the fall of the Republic, Sołtyk went into retirement on his estates in Chlewiska, West Galicia. He became busy with producing agrarian and metallurgical products and soon became one of the major industrialists in the region. He took part in the cultural life of Warsaw and organized meetings of artists and writers. In 1800 he founded the Warsaw Society of Friends of Learning. Together with Tadeusz Czacki and others, he founded the Trade Society in 1802.

Sołtyk returned to political life in the Duchy of Warsaw, after Marshal Joachim Murat appointed him a member of the Supreme Justice Chamber (Najwyższa Izba Sprawiedliwości) in 1807. From 1811 until 1812 he served as member of the Sejm. In 1811 he was appointed as Sejm Marshal.

During Congress Poland, he was a member of the Sejm and senator-castellan. From 1823, a member and one of the authorities of the underground Polish Patriotic Society in Russian occupied Poland. He was arrested in 1826 and convicted of treason against the state. In 1829 after four years in prison, he was acquitted and released. At the time, his legal representative was Marceli Tarczewski.

Sołtyk supported the November Uprising in 1830 but due to his old age and poor health, he could not take part in the Sejm assembly to put his signature under the act to dethrone Czar Nicolas I on 25 January 1831. He sent a letter to the Sejm submitting his support.

For his patriotic activities, the Sejm raised Sołtyk to the rank of senator-voivode on 28 May 1831. He died in Warsaw on 4 June 1833.

== Awards ==
- Knight of the Order of Saint Stanislaus, awarded in 1783.
- Knight of the Order of the White Eagle, awarded in 1788.
