= Andrzej Bryl =

Polish martial artist (1957–2020)

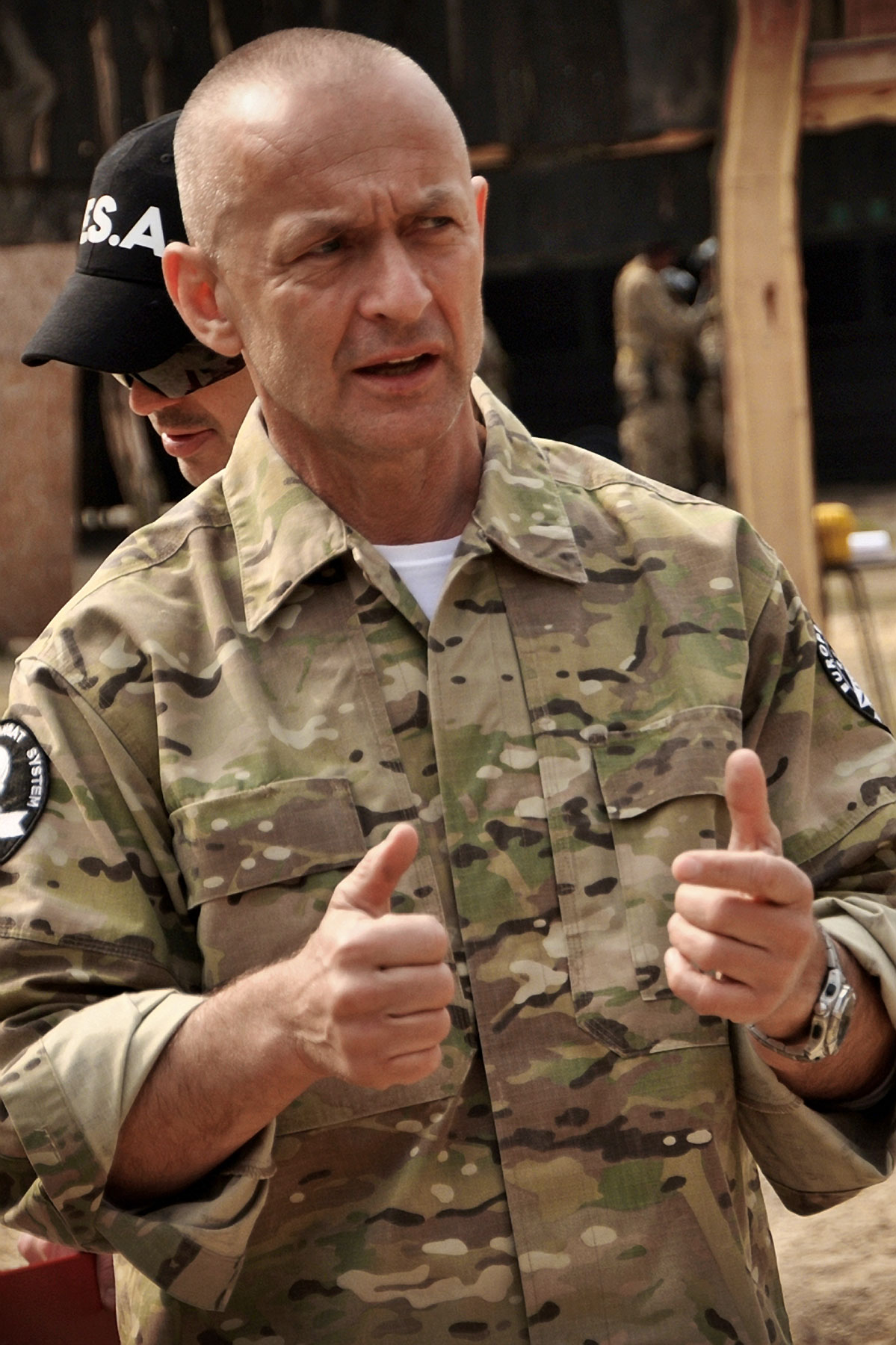
- Born: 30 June 1957; Cybinka, Poland
- Died: 24 February 2020 (aged 62); Włościejewki, Poland
- Education: European Security Academy
- Occupation: Close Combat Expert

Andrzej Bryl (30 June 1957 – 24 February 2020) was a Polish doctor of social sciences, an international expert in the field of close combat, creator of the BAS-3 combat system and president of the ITF Polish Federation of Taekwondo.

== Career ==
Bryl was born in Cybinka and graduated from the Academy of Physical Education in Wrocław (1979) and the Lomonosov Moscow State University (1985). He obtained a doctorate in sociology in 1990 at the Faculty of Social Sciences of the University of Wrocław. From 1985 until 1992, he was a faculty member of the Academy of Physical Education in Wrocław. He was the first Pole to obtain the title of master in Taekwondo at the World Taekwondo Institute in Canada (he received a black belt from Choi Hong Hi, who is regarded by many as the creator of Taekwondo). He was also a 6th dan in the Philippines martial art Kalaki.

In 1985, Bryl created the BAS-3 close combat system for special units of the army and sub-units of the anti-terrorist police.

In 1989, in North Korea, he received the 3rd dan in Taekwondo. He was the long-time president of the ITF Polish Federation of Taekwondo. In 1992, Bryl founded the first Central and Eastern Europe professional Centre for Special Training (CST) for uniformed services and civilian security agencies.

In 2005, a book Zawodowiec based on his life and adventures was published.

In 2007, together with Jarosław Śliwka, he took part in the Trans-Siberian Extreme race from Moscow to Ulaanbaatar.

In 2008, he transformed CST into the European Security Academy and created the Delta Executive Protection personal protection team.

In 2010, together with former members of the Polish special forces, he conducted training for the bodyguards of the Libyan leader Muammar Gaddafi.

== Death ==
Dr. Andrzej Bryl has died as a result of cancer on the 24 February 2020 in Włościejewki, Poland.

== Bibliography ==
- *Andrzej Bryl, *Choi Jung Hwa (1990). Taekwon-do: koreańska sztuka samoobrony (in Polish). Wrocław. OCLC 749903453.
- Krzysztof Przepiórka, Dominik Rutkowski (2017). Szturman. Odważni żyją, ostrożni trwają (in Polish). Warszawa: Czerwone i Czarne. ISBN 9788377002964. OCLC 1010841589.
