= Gogolewo =

Gogolewo may refer to the following places:

- Gogolewo, Gostyń County in Greater Poland Voivodeship (west-central Poland)
- Gogolewo, Śrem County in Greater Poland Voivodeship (west-central Poland)
- Gogolewo, Słupsk County in Pomeranian Voivodeship (north Poland)
- Gogolewo, Tczew County in Pomeranian Voivodeship (north Poland)
- Gogolewo, West Pomeranian Voivodeship (north-west Poland)
