= Marian Przykucki =

Polish Roman Catholic archbishop (1924–2009)

- Archbishop of Szczecin-Kamień
- Church: Catholic Church
- Archdiocese: Archdiocese of Szczecin-Kamień
- In office: 25 March 1992 – 1 May 1999
- Predecessor: Kazimierz Majdański
- Successor: Zygmunt Kamiński
- Previous posts: Bishop of Chelmno (1981-1992); Titular Bishop of Glenndálocha (1973-1981); Auxiliary Bishop of Poznań (1973-1981)

Orders
- Ordination: 19 February 1950 by Walenty Dymek
- Consecration: 3 February 1974 by Antoni Baraniak

Personal details
- Born: 27 January 1924 Skoki, Poznań Voivodeship, Poland
- Died: 16 October 2009 (aged 85) Szczecin, West Pomeranian Voivodeship, Poland

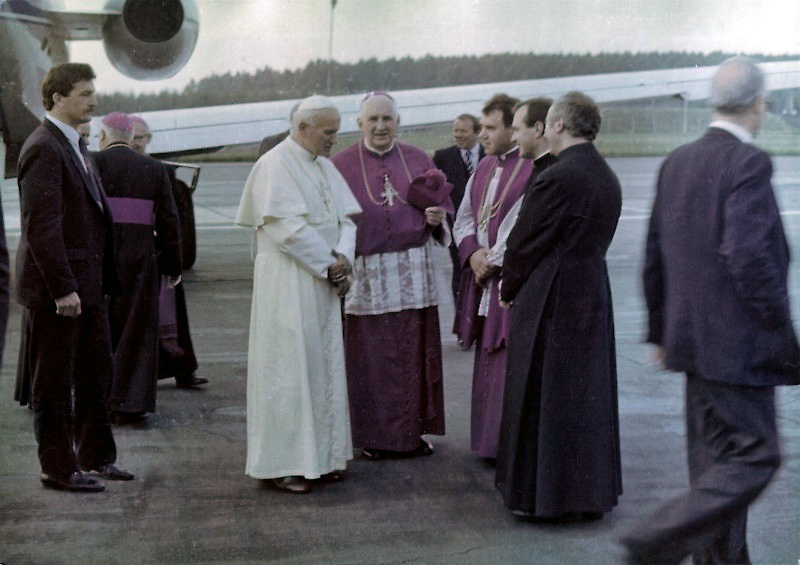
Pope John Paul II and Bishop Marian Przykucki in Gdynia – 11 June 1987

Archbishop Marian Przykucki (27 January 1924 – 16 October 2009) was the Polish Roman Catholic Metropolitan Archbishop of Szczecin-Kamień from 1992 until 1 May 1999.

== Background ==
Born in Skoki in 1924, Marian Przykucki was ordained a parish priest on 19 February 1950, aged 26, in Poznań, Poland.

On 12 December 1973, aged 49, he was appointed Auxiliary Bishop of Poznań. On 3 February 1974 he was ordained Titular Bishop of Glenndálocha. On 15 June 1981 he was appointed Bishop of Roman Catholic Diocese of Chełmno (Culm) in which Kashubians live. He took care of the usage of Kashubian language in liturgy.

On 25 March 1992, aged 68, he was appointed Archbishop of Szczecin-Kamień, Poland. He retired on 1 May 1999.

== Death ==
Archbishop Emeritus Przykucki died on 16 October 2009, aged 85.

== External links and References ==
- Catholic Hierarchy: Archbishop Marian Przykucki
- Zmarł Ksiądz Arcybiskup Senior Marian Przykucki (Polish)
