= Kołacin =

Kołacin may refer to the following places in Poland:

- Kołacin, Pomeranian Voivodeship (north Poland)
- Kołacin, Łódź Voivodeship (central Poland)
- Kołacin, Greater Poland Voivodeship (west-central Poland)
