= Kiełczyn =

Kiełczyn may refer to the following places in Poland:

- Kiełczyn, Lower Silesian Voivodeship (south-west Poland)
- Kiełczyn, Greater Poland Voivodeship (west-central Poland)
