= Antoni Baraniak =

Polish Salesian and archbishop

His Excellency, The Most Reverend Antoni Baraniak SDB
- Archbishop of Poznań
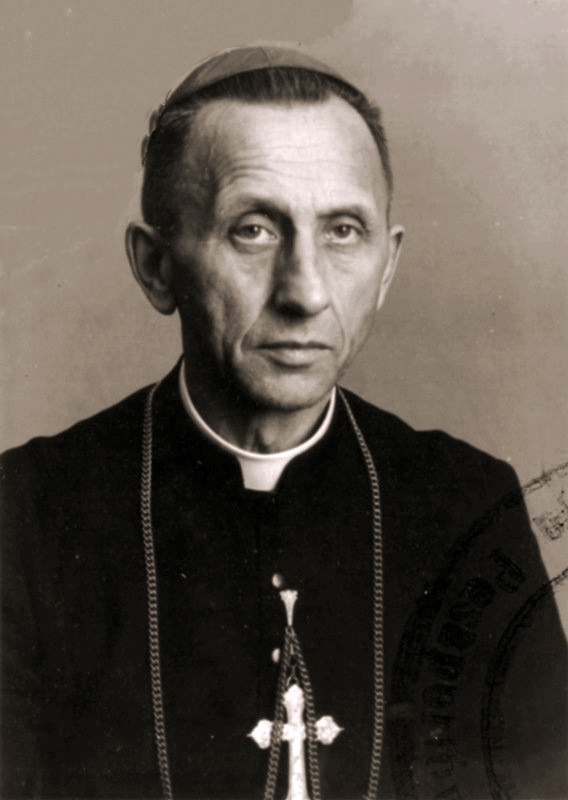
- Church: Roman Catholic Church
- Archdiocese: Poznań
- See: Poznań
- Appointed: 30 May 1957
- Installed: 2 July 1957
- Term ended: 13 August 1977
- Predecessor: Walenty Dymek
- Successor: Jerzy Stroba
- Previous posts: Auxiliary Bishop of Gniezno (1951-57); Titular Bishop of Theodosiopolis in Armenia (1951-57)

Orders
- Ordination: 3 August 1930 by Adam Stefan Sapieha
- Consecration: 8 July 1951 by Stefan Wyszyński
- Rank: Archbishop

Personal details
- Born: Antoni Baraniak; 1 January 1904 Sebastianowo, Congress Poland
- Died: 13 August 1977 (aged 73) Poznań, Poland
- Education: Pontifical Gregorian University
- Motto: Da mihi animas caetera tolle

Ordination history of Antoni Baraniak
History
Priestly ordination
- Ordained by: Adam Stefan Sapieha
Episcopal consecration
- Principal consecrator: Stefan Wyszyński
- Co-consecrators: Tadeusz Paweł Zakrzewski; Lucjan Bernacki
Episcopal succession
Bishops consecrated by Antoni Baraniak as principal consecrator
- Jerzy Stroba: 16 November 1958
- Tadeusz Etter: 22 October 1959
- Adam Sawicki: 2 June 1963
- Marian Przykucki: 3 February 1974

Antoni Baraniak, SDB (1 January 1904 – 13 August 1977) was a Polish Salesian who served as the Archbishop of Poznań from mid-1957 until his death. Baraniak studied in Poland and in Rome prior to his ordination and served as the private aide to Cardinals August Hlond and Stefan Wyszyński; he was devoted to both men and served with both during World War II and the increasing communist repression. He served as a bishop in Gniezno before being appointed as an archbishop though just prior to that was arrested. The communist authorities interrogated and tortured Baraniak while he was imprisoned but remained silent and refused to tell his captors about the activities of prelates.

Baraniak's life has caused calls for his beatification to be made and it has been decided that the cause will be requested and then launched if it is approved.

== Life ==
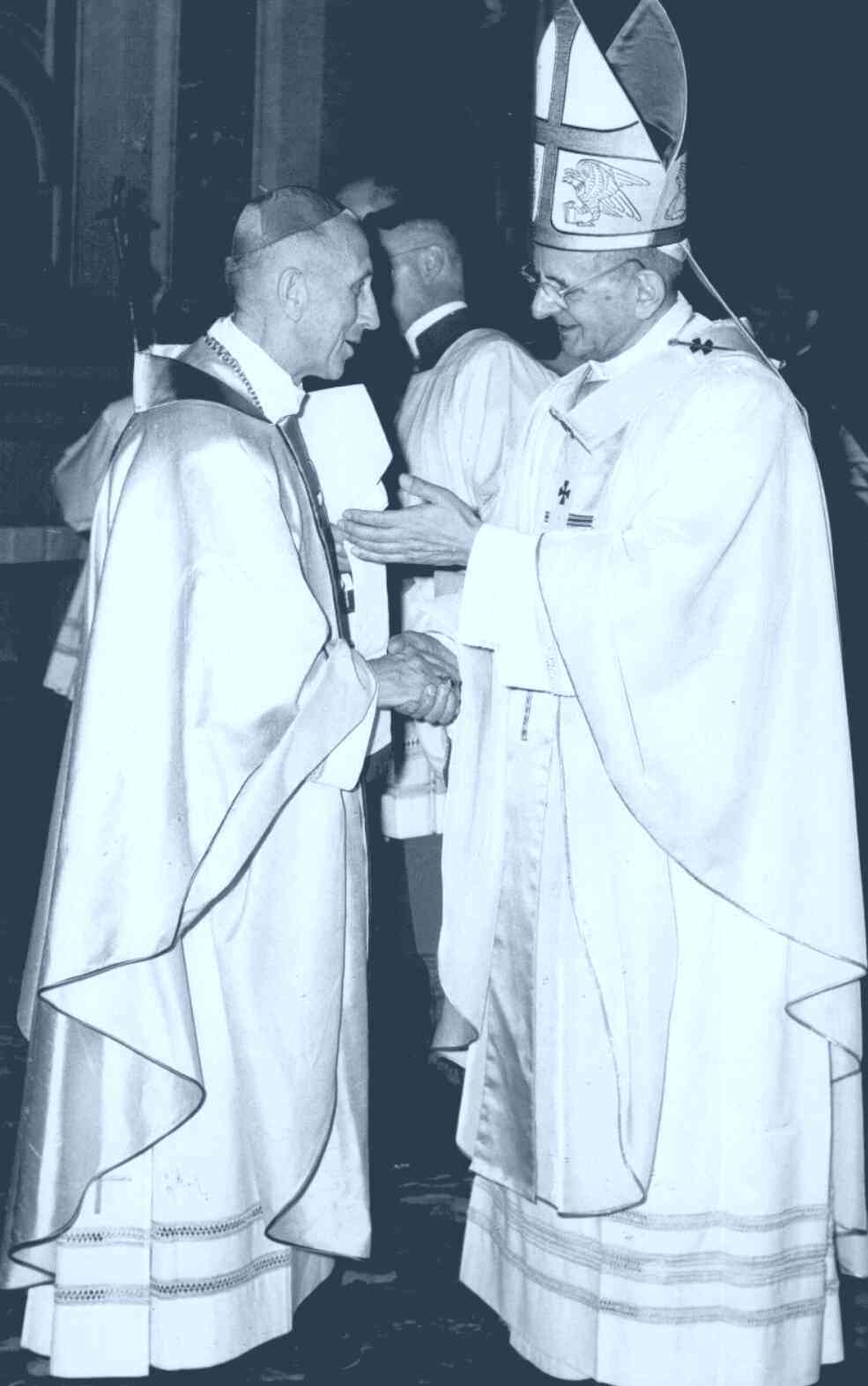
Baraniak and Pope Paul VI in 1976

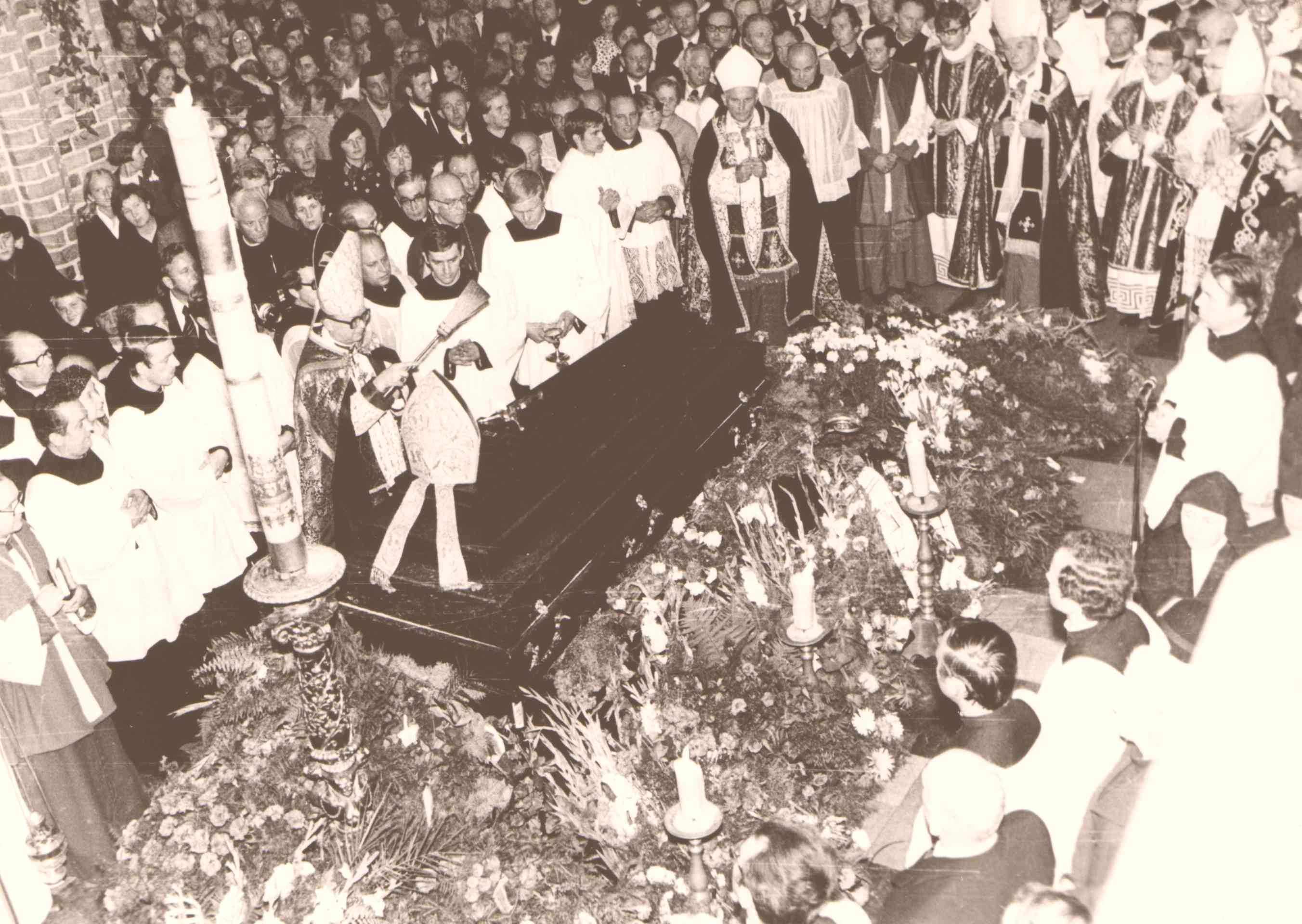
His funeral

=== Education and priesthood ===
Antoni Baraniak was born on 1 January 1904 in Sebastianowo.

On 1 September 1917 he travelled to Oświęcim to commence his high school education under the Salesians of Don Bosco whom he decided to join when he decided he wished to enter the priesthood. Baraniak commenced his novitiate with the order in 1920 and made his initial profession on 28 July 1921. From 1921 to 1924 he attended the Philosophical College in Kraków where he obtained his diploma on 30 May 1924 before making his perpetual profession into the Salesians on 15 March 1925. He served also as a teacher in Klecza Dolna and in Warsaw from 1924 until 1927 when he was sent for theological studies at the Pontifical Gregorian University in Rome where he was stationed until 1931 upon earning his doctorate.

Baraniak received his ordination to the priesthood in the Carmelite church in Kraków on 3 August 1930 from Adam Stefan Sapieha. He was later appointed in 1933 to serve as the chaplain and private aide to Cardinal August Hlond and supported the cardinal during World War II that prompted them to flee Poland for a time. The two first fled to Romania before setting off for France where the two resided in Lourdes from 9 June 1940 until 1943 when the two spent their time living until mid-1945 in the Benedictine convent at Hautecombe.

The two were in Paris sometime after this and left for Rome in May 1945 once the war on the European front had ended and the pair returned to their native Poland on 20 July 1945 to Poznań. He and Hlond had visited Polish refugees during the war and were involved with charities to alleviate the suffering of those displaced and poor.

=== Episcopate and imprisonment ===
Hlond died in 1948 and he became the private aide and chaplain to Hlond's successor Stefan Wyszyński in what became a close and deep friendship. He was present at Hlond's deathbed when Hlond pronounced Wyszyński as his successor. He accompanied Wyszyński on his first "ad limina apostolorum" visit to Pope Pius XII in April 1951 just before Baraniak would be named as a bishop. On 26 April 1951 news came that Pius XII had appointed him as a titular bishop and the Auxiliary Bishop of Gniezno; he received his episcopal consecration in the Gniezno Cathedral on 8 July 1951 from Wyszyński himself. On 12 January 1953 he attended the consistory in Saint Peter's Basilica that saw Pius XII name Wyszyński as a cardinal. During the night on 25 September 1953 he and Wyszynski were both in the episcopal palace when both prelates were arrested after officers stormed the place. Baraniak tried to hold them back but an officer shouted at him: "Hands up or I'll shoot!" Ten agents entered and searched the office and he said several rosaries as the agents searched the place. In the morning on 24 September he was told the decision had been made to arrest him and the soldiers ordered him to dress. He asked them what to wear and one soldier told him put on "something warm". He was placed in detention at the Mokotów prison and was interrogated and tortured; he was subjected to 145 interrogations that often lasted hours. His briefcase and rosary were taken from him upon his arrival and he was sent to a concrete cell that had a bowl and toilet as well as a small stool and water jug next to the bunk. The torture included tearing his nails off and keeping him naked in ice and feces for prolonged periods and he was even refused food and medical care as well as visits and correspondence.

His doctor Milada Tycowa examined him in 1976 and noted that his back was covered in scars he endured from beatings while he was imprisoned. He was later released on 30 October 1956. The communists had a particular emphasis on learning about his time in Rome as a student and the relationships he forged there believing them to be of an "espionage nature" and the internal affairs department monitored his conversations.

=== Later activities ===
Baraniak later accompanied Cardinal Wyszyński to another "ad limina apostolorum" visit to the pope that was held on 14 May 1957 just a couple of weeks before his archiepiscopal elevation. Pius XII appointed Baraniak as the newest Archbishop of Poznań on 30 May 1957 and the new archbishop was enthroned in his new episcopal see on 2 July 1957 while later receiving the Pallium on 8 September 1958 from Bolesław Filipiak. He became fluent in Italian and attended all sessions of the Second Vatican Council from 1962 to 1965. In the first session of the Council he was elected as a member of the Oriental Commission and presented a proposal for the revision of the liturgical calendar while he contributed to the drafting of Dignitatis humanae. Baraniak later participated in the 1971 Synod of Bishops and attended the 1971 beatification of Maximilian Kolbe and the 1975 beatification of Maria Theresa Ledóchowska.

The archbishop was known to smoke cigarettes which became a habit he had picked up on in prison and he sometimes liked to indulge in a glass of wine or cognac. He was known to have a close friendship with Cardinal Karol Józef Wojtyła - the future Pope John Paul II - and he entertained the private notion that Wojtyła had the potential to be elected pope in the future. Baraniak also ordained and consecrated prominent individuals at this point and ordained the future Cardinal Zenon Grocholewski in 1963 and the future Archbishop Marek Jędraszewski in 1973.

=== Death and funeral ===
He died after an extended illness on 13 August 1977 in a Poznań hospital and was buried in the metropolitan cathedral. His friend Cardinal Wojtyła visited him in August in hospital and he presided over Baraniak's funeral with Wyszyński delivering the eulogy.

== Beatification cause introduction ==
Baraniak's reputation for holiness and the nature of his life and tribulation has prompted calls for him to be beatified with 3000 signing a petition asking for the competent ecclesial authorities to launch the process for his beatification. Archbishop Stanisław Gądecki announced on 6 October 2017 that he would make the request to the Congregation for the Causes of Saints to launch the process which would begin in Poznań.

Catholic Church titles
Preceded by Domenico Della Vedova	— TITULAR — Titular Bishop of Theodosiopolis in Armenia; 26 April 1951 – 30 May 1957	Succeeded by Horacio Arturo Gómez Davila
Preceded by Lucjan Bernacki	Auxiliary Bishop of Gniezno; 26 April 1951 – 30 May 1957	Succeeded by Andrzej Wronka
Preceded by Walenty Dymek	Archbishop of Poznań; 30 May 1957 – 13 August 1977	Succeeded by Jerzy Stroba
