= Chrząstowo =

Chrząstowo may refer to the following places:

- Chrząstowo, Greater Poland Voivodeship (west-central Poland)
- Chrząstowo, Inowrocław County in Kuyavian-Pomeranian Voivodeship (north-central Poland)
- Chrząstowo, Nakło County in Kuyavian-Pomeranian Voivodeship (north-central Poland)
- Chrząstowo, Pomeranian Voivodeship (north Poland)
- Chrząstowo, West Pomeranian Voivodeship (north-west Poland)
