= Maksymilian Cygalski =

Polish telegraphist & patriot

- Portrait of Maksymilian Cygalski
- Born: September 17, 1900; Saworry, German Empire
- Died: October 5, 1939 (aged 39); Danzig-Saspe, Nazi Germany
- Cause of death: Execution by firing squad
- Burial place: Zawory
- Occupations: Telegrapher; Patriot
- Spouse: Ewa Gertruda (m. 1931)
- Children: 2
- Parents: Tomasz Cygalski (father); Antonina Guenther (mother)

Maksymillian Cygalski (September 17, 1900 – October 5, 1939) was a Polish telegrapher and patriot who fought in the Greater Poland Uprising in (1918–1919) and defended The Polish Post Office In Danzig on September 1, 1939.

== Early life ==
He was born on September 17, 1900 in Zawory as the son of Tomasz and Antonina Guenther. After graduating from primary school, he studied at a gardening school in Berlin. After graduating on October 1, 1918, he was conscripted into the German army and was incorporated into the regiment in Frankfurt.

== Greater Poland Uprising (1918–1919) ==
Three months later in December 1918, he ran away from the German army and joined the Wielkopolska Uprising in Poznań. In 1919, he was assigned to the signal forces in the Poznań Citadel. After a Morse code course, he was incorporated into the 2nd Wielkopolska Telegraphist Battalion of the 14th Infantry Division. He took part in fighting in the east until August 1920, when he was withdrawn from the front due to dysentery.

== Post-War period ==
In December 1920, he received a referral to a juzist course (operating teletypewriters) in Poznań, after completing which, in June 1921, he volunteered at the Supreme Command of the Upper Silesian Insurgent Army. He took part in the Silesian Uprising from June 6 to July 7, 1921. After he fought at the Bolshevik Front Then he worked at the Main Staff in Warsaw for two months as a juzist. After completing his education, on October 1, 1921, he joined the postal and telegraph service in Poznań. In 1927, he was transferred to Gdańsk, to the Gdańsk Postal and Telegraphic Office No. 1, where he was the manager until September 1, 1939.

== Death ==
He took part in the Defence of the Polish Post Office in Danzig in Danzig on September 1, 1939. After surrendering at 7 p.m., when the Germans flooded the Post Office's basement with gasoline and set it on fire, he was among the group of arrested people who were allowed to leave the building alive. The trial of the postal workers soon took place. All of them were sentenced to death by the verdict of the military court of the group of General Friedrich-Georg Eberhardt. He was shot along with others, on October 5, 1939 in Zaspa.

== Legacy ==
In 1971, he was posthumously awarded the Military Order of Virtuti Militari, 5th class, by the President of the Republic of Poland-in-exile, August Zaleski. In 1991, the murdered postal workers were discovered. Their ashes were buried on April 4, 1992 in the common grave of 38 defenders of the Polish Post Office at the cemetery in Zaspa. In 1999, he was granted honorary citizenship of Gdańsk.
