= Międzybórz (disambiguation) =

Międzybórz may refer to the following places in Poland:

- Międzybórz, also known as Międzybórz Sycowski, town in Lower Silesian Voivodeship (south-west Poland)
- Międzybórz, Greater Poland Voivodeship (west-central Poland)
- Międzybórz, Łódź Voivodeship (central Poland)
- Międzybórz, Pomeranian Voivodeship (north Poland)

== See also ==
- Medzhybizh, town in Western Ukraine (till 1795 Międzybórz in the Polish–Lithuanian Commonwealth), famous for Hassidism
