= Kiełczynek =

- Village
- Location within Poland
- Coordinates: 52°4′N 17°13′E
- Country: Poland
- Voivodeship: Greater Poland
- County: Śrem
- Gmina: Książ Wielkopolski
- Elevation: 70 m (230 ft)
- Population: 326

Kiełczynek [kʲɛu̯ˈt͡ʂɨnɛk] is a village in the administrative district of Gmina Książ Wielkopolski, within Śrem County, Greater Poland Voivodeship, in west-central Poland.
