= Gmina Książ Wielkopolski =

Gmina Książ Wielkopolski Książ Wielkopolski Commune
- Gmina
- Coat of arms
- Interactive map of Gmina Książ Wielkopolski
- Coordinates (Książ Wielkopolski): 52°4′N 17°14′E
- Country: Poland
- Voivodeship: Greater Poland
- County: Śrem
- Seat: Książ Wielkopolski

Area
  - Total: 147.87 km^{2} (57.09 sq mi)

Population (2006)
  - Total: 8,429
  - Density: 57.00/km^{2} (147.6/sq mi)
  - Urban: 2,724
  - Rural: 5,705

Gmina Książ Wielkopolski is an urban-rural gmina (administrative district) in Śrem County, Greater Poland Voivodeship, in west-central Poland. Its seat is the town of Książ Wielkopolski, which lies approximately 15 kilometres (9 mi) east of Śrem and 43 km (27 mi) south-east of the regional capital Poznań.

The gmina covers an area of 147.87 square kilometres (57.1 sq mi), and as of 2006 its total population is 8,429 (out of which the population of Książ Wielkopolski amounts to 2,724, and the population of the rural part of the gmina is 5,705).

== Villages ==
Apart from the town of Książ Wielkopolski, Gmina Książ Wielkopolski contains the villages and settlements of Brzóstownia, Charłub, Chrząstowo, Chwałkowo Kościelne, Feliksowo, Gogolewko, Gogolewo, Jarosławki, Kiełczyn, Kiełczynek, Kołacin, Konarskie, Konarzyce, Łężek, Ługi, Mchy, Międzybórz, Obreda, Radoszkowo, Radoszkowo Drugie, Sebastianowo, Sroczewo, Świączyń, Świączynek, Włościejewice, Włościejewki, Zaborowo, Zakrzewice, Zakrzewo and Zawory.

== Neighbouring gminas ==
Gmina Książ Wielkopolski is bordered by the gminas of Dolsk, Jaraczewo, Krzykosy, Nowe Miasto nad Wartą, Śrem and Zaniemyśl.
