= Mchy, Greater Poland Voivodeship =

Mchy
- Village
- Location within Poland
- Coordinates: 52°1′N 17°14′E
- Country: Poland
- Voivodeship: Greater Poland
- County: Śrem
- Gmina: Książ Wielkopolski
- Elevation: 100 m (330 ft)
- Population: 692

Mchy [mxɨ] is a village in the administrative district of Gmina Książ Wielkopolski, within Śrem County, Greater Poland Voivodeship, in west-central Poland.
