= Wichorowo =

- Village
- Location within Poland
- Coordinates: 52°33′26″N 20°23′29″E
- Country: Poland
- Voivodeship: Masovian
- County: Płońsk
- Gmina: Naruszewo

Wichorowo [vixɔˈrɔvɔ] is a village in the administrative district of Gmina Naruszewo, within Płońsk County, Masovian Voivodeship, in east-central Poland.
