= Łazęki =

- Village
- Location within Poland
- Coordinates: 52°28′N 20°18′E
- Country: Poland
- Voivodeship: Masovian
- County: Płońsk
- Gmina: Naruszewo

Łazęki [waˈzɛnki] is a village in the administrative district of Gmina Naruszewo, within Płońsk County, Masovian Voivodeship, in east-central Poland.
