= Januszewo, Masovian Voivodeship =

Januszewo
- Village
- Location within Poland
- Coordinates: 52°29′N 20°25′E
- Country: Poland
- Voivodeship: Masovian
- County: Płońsk
- Gmina: Naruszewo

Januszewo [januˈʂɛvɔ] is a village in the administrative district of Gmina Naruszewo, within Płońsk County, Masovian Voivodeship, in east-central Poland.
