= Jerzy Stroba =

Polish bishop (1919–1999)

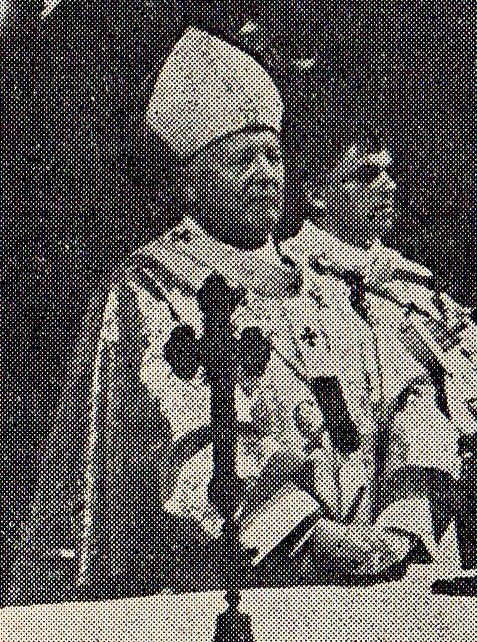
- Stroba in 1990
- Church: Roman Catholic Church

Orders
- Ordination: 19 December 1942 by Adolf Bertram
- Consecration: 16 November 1958 by Antoni Baraniak

Personal details
- Born: 17 December 1919; Świętochłowice, Free State of Prussia, Weimar Republic
- Died: 12 May 1999 (aged 79); Poznań, Greater Poland Voivodeship, Poland

Jerzy Stroba (17 December 1919 – 12 May 1999) was a Polish Roman Catholic bishop.

He was born on 17 December 1919 in Świętochłowice, Poland. He became Auxiliary Bishop of Ggorzowski from 1958 to 1972, Bishop of Szczecin–Kamień in 1972–1978, Archbishop of Poznań from 1978 to 1999.

He died on 12 May 1999 in Poznań.

Religious titles
| Preceded by Antoni Baraniak | Archbishop of Poznań; 1978–1996 | Succeeded by Juliusz Paetz |
