= Gmina Naruszewo =

Gmina Naruszewo Naruszewo Commune
- Gmina
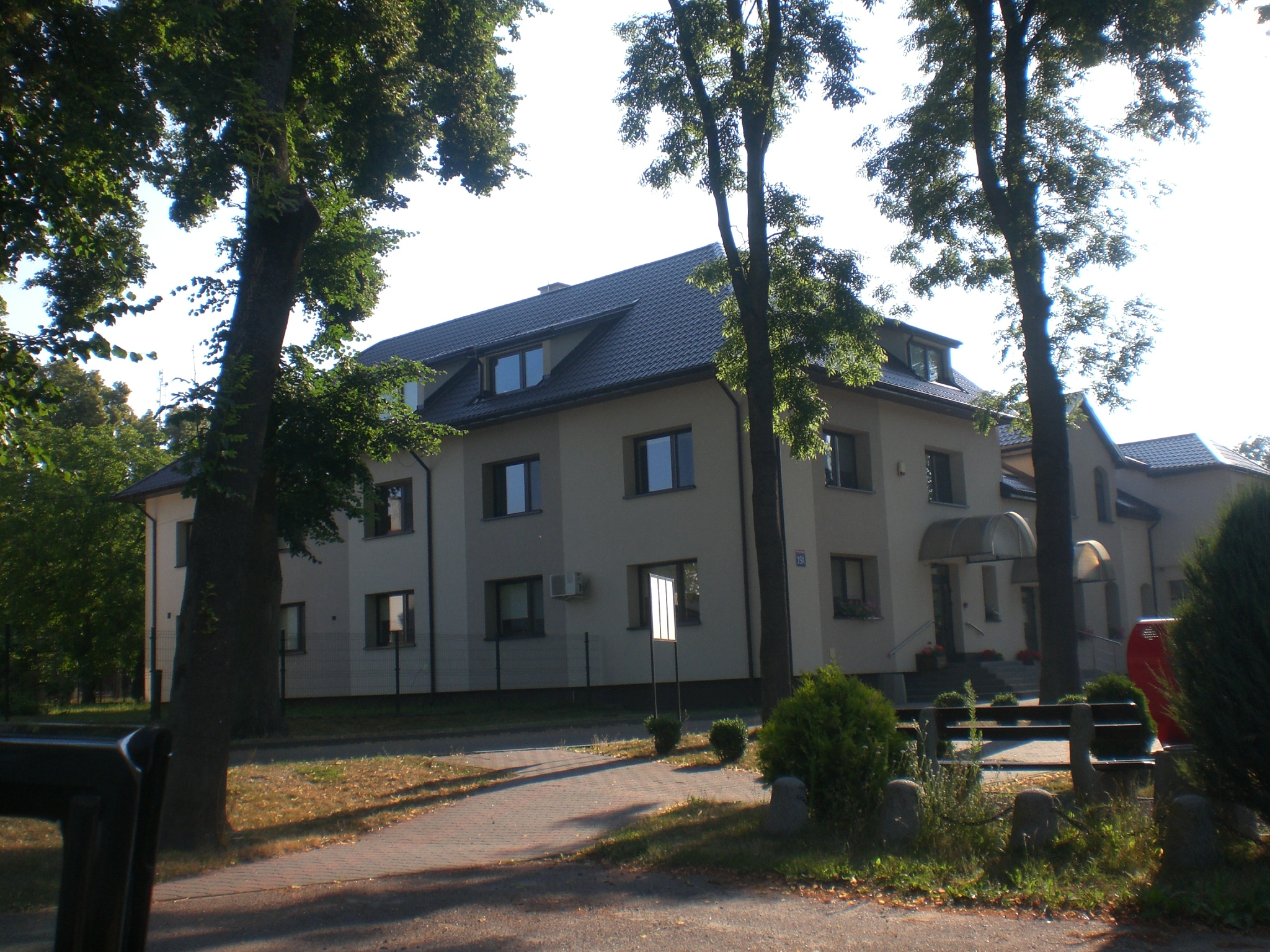
- Municipal office
- Interactive map of Gmina Naruszewo
- Coordinates (Naruszewo): 52°32′N 20°22′E
- Country: Poland
- Voivodeship: Masovian
- County: Płońsk
- Seat: Naruszewo

Area
  - Total: 159.55 km^{2} (61.60 sq mi)

Population (2013)
  - Total: 6,504
  - Density: 40.76/km^{2} (105.6/sq mi)
- Website: naruszewo.pl

Gmina Naruszewo is a rural gmina (administrative district) in Płońsk County, Masovian Voivodeship, in east-central Poland. Its seat is the village of Naruszewo, which lies approximately 11 kilometres (6.8 mi) south of Płońsk and 55 kilometres (34 mi) north-west of Warsaw.

The gmina covers an area of 159.55 square kilometres (61.6 sq mi), and as of 2006 its total population is 6,577 (6,504 in 2013).

== Villages ==
Gmina Naruszewo contains the villages and settlements of:

- Beszyno
- Dłutowo
- Drochówka
- Drochowo
- Grąbczewo
- Januszewo
- Kębłowice
- Kozarzewo
- Krysk
- Krysk Nowy
- Łazęki
- Michałowo
- Nacpolsk
- Naruszewo
- Nowe Naruszewo
- Nowy Nacpolsk
- Pieścidła
- Postróże
- Potyry
- Rąbież
- Radzymin
- Radzyminek
- Skarboszewo
- Skarszyn
- Skwary
- Sobanice
- Sosenkowo
- Srebrna
- Stachowo
- Stary Nacpolsk
- Strzembowo
- Troski
- Wichorowo
- Wola-Krysk
- Wróblewo
- Wronino
- Zaborowo
- Żukowo
- Żukowo-Poświętne

== Neighbouring gminas ==
Gmina Naruszewo is bordered by the gminas of Bulkowo, Czerwińsk nad Wisłą, Dzierzążnia, Mała Wieś, Płońsk, Wyszogród and Załuski.
