= Skwary, Masovian Voivodeship =

Skwary
- Village
- Location within Poland
- Coordinates: 52°32′42″N 20°20′28″E
- Country: Poland
- Voivodeship: Masovian
- County: Płońsk
- Gmina: Naruszewo

Skwary [ˈskfarɨ] is a village in the administrative district of Gmina Naruszewo, within Płońsk County, Masovian Voivodeship, in east-central Poland.
