= European Security Academy =

Training centre in Wroclaw, Poland

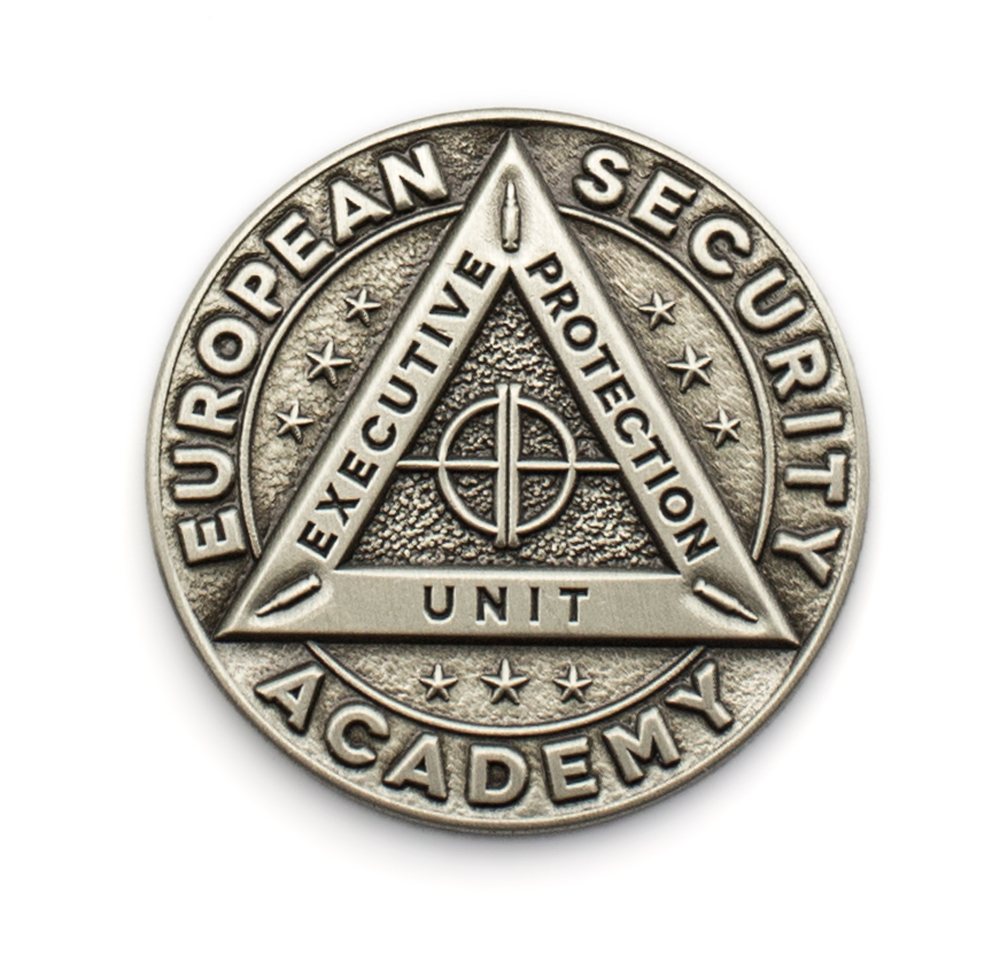
- Company type: Training centre
- Traded as: European Security Academy, EUSECA
- Industry: Defence and Security
- Founded: 1992; 33 years ago
- Founder: Andrzej Bryl
- Headquarters: Wroclaw, Poland
- Area served: Worldwide
- Key people: Dr Andrzej Bryl (CEO)
- Services: Security training, security consulting, military training
- Website: www.euseca.com

The European Security Academy (ESA) has been established in 1992 by Andrzej Bryl as the Special Training Centre that provides with training services within the scope of personal protection, maritime protection, protection in a high-risk environment (PMC), first aid and shooting. It performs also security-related consultancy services. The ESA training centre is located in west Poland.

== History ==
In 2009, the organization was presented for the first time on the IWA trade fair in Nuremberg. From 2010–2012, the company was also presented on the LAAD fair in Brazil, Milipol in Qatar, and on the Defence EXPO in Thailand.

In 2010, the European Security Academy organised comprehensive training for the Libyan Government Protection Bureau. It was a four-month project preparing agents for their service for the state VIPs, including Muammar Gaddafi and members of his family.

In 2013, Discovery Channel broadcast the program Secret World of Bodyguards. It included six episodes showing training activities in the European Security Academy. One year later, Canal+ broadcast another ten episodes of the series titled Elite Bodyguards, which is a sequel of Secret Bodyguards, showing activities of the ESA trainers and trainees in operations all over the world – among others in Iraq, Brazil, Colombia, or the Gulf of Aden.

The European Security Academy is accredited by the British awarding bodies such as City & Guilds, Pearson or Highfield.

ESA trains police officers and soldiers and has trained units from the European Union, such as a special intervention squad of the military police from Poland and the Dutch special task force BSB-KMAR.

While ESA claims to "carefully [check] all applicants’ backgrounds and [...] not train individuals with links to the far-right", Bellingcat has documented white supremacists repeatedly training at the ESA.
