= Krysk Nowy =

- Village
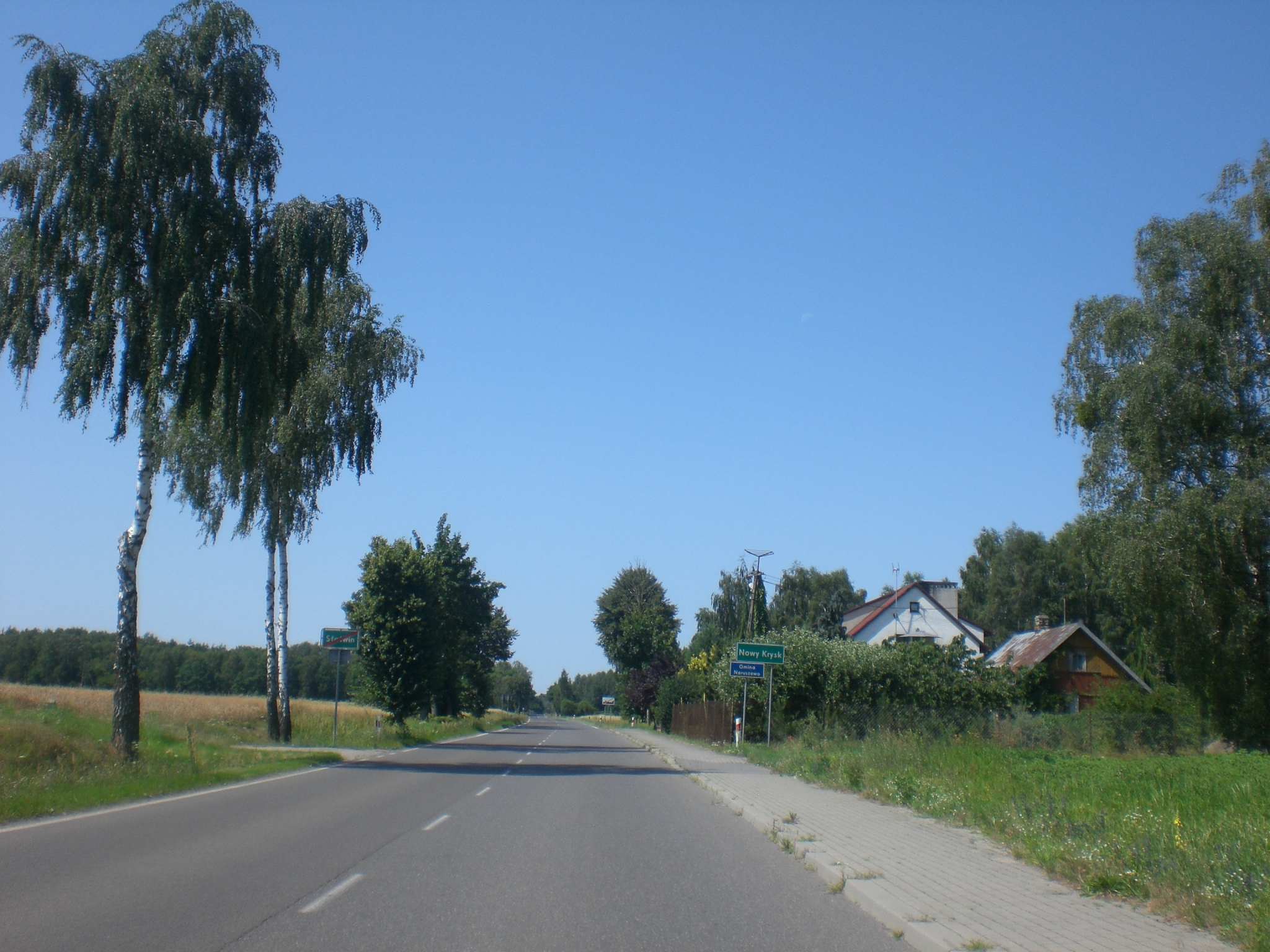

- Location within Poland
- Coordinates: 52°32′16″N 20°26′34″E
- Country: Poland
- Voivodeship: Masovian
- County: Płońsk
- Gmina: Naruszewo

Krysk Nowy [ˈkrɨsk ˈnɔvɨ] is a village in the administrative district of Gmina Naruszewo, within Płońsk County, Masovian Voivodeship, in east-central Poland. It lies approximately 7 km north-west of Załuski, 11 km south-east of Płońsk, and 53 km north-west of Warsaw. In the late 1800s there were 11 houses and 210 inhabitants. Farmland covered 886 morgen of land, 26 morgen not in use. The Krysk colony of non-Polish inhabitants had 6 houses with 63 people on 346 morgen of land. In 1827 the village numbered 18 houses and 287 inhabitants.
