= Ługi, Śrem County =

Ługi
- Village
- Location within Poland
- Coordinates: 51°59′N 17°11′E
- Country: Poland
- Voivodeship: Greater Poland
- County: Śrem
- Gmina: Książ Wielkopolski
- Highest elevation: 110 m (360 ft)
- Lowest elevation: 100 m (330 ft)
- Population: 240

Ługi [ˈwuɡi] is a village in the administrative district of Gmina Książ Wielkopolski, within Śrem County, Greater Poland Voivodeship, in west-central Poland.
