= Naruszewo =

- Village
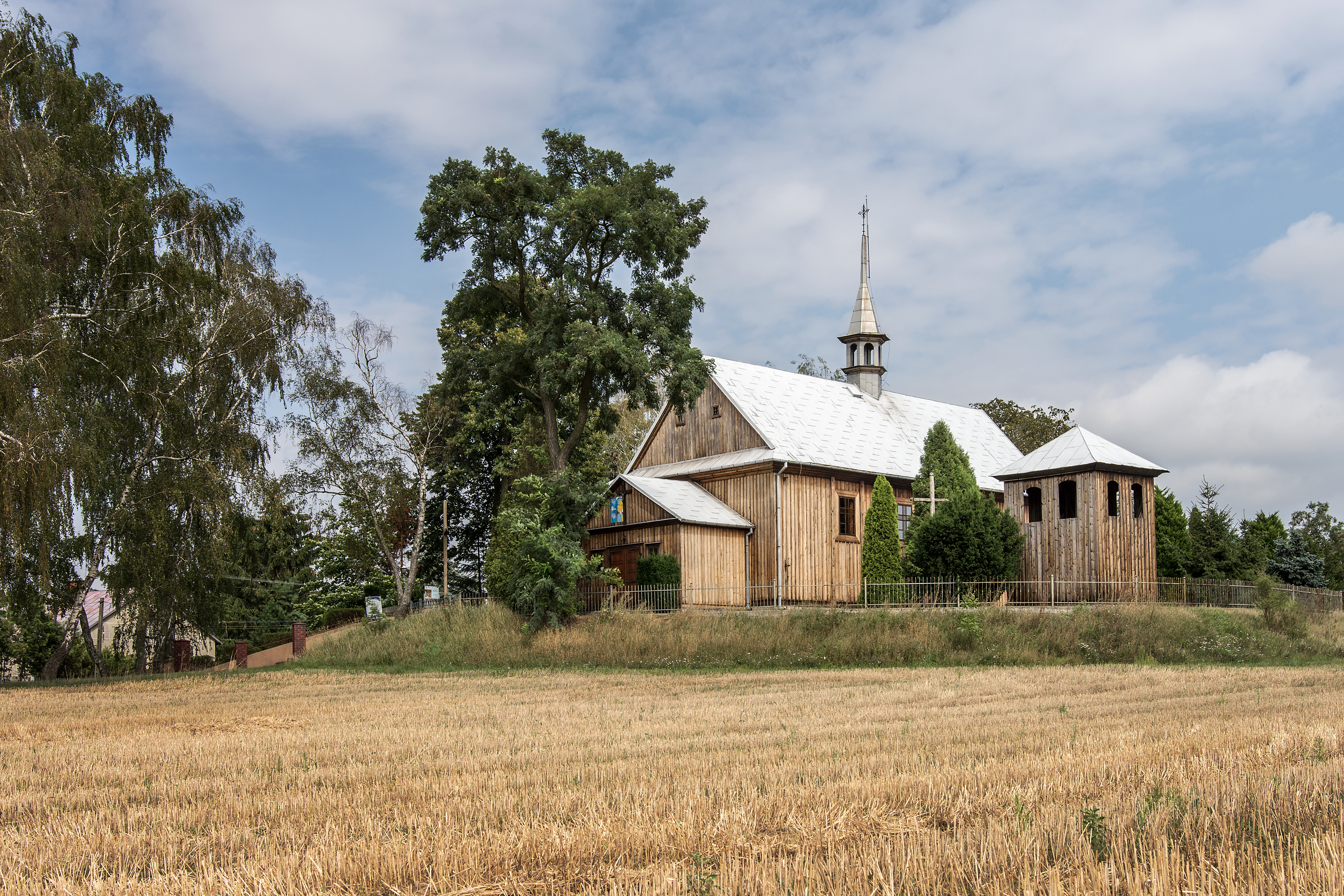
- Church of Holy Trinity

- Location within Poland
- Coordinates: 52°32′N 20°22′E
- Country: Poland
- Voivodeship: Masovian
- County: Płońsk
- Gmina: Naruszewo

Naruszewo [naruˈʂɛvɔ] is a village in Płońsk County, Masovian Voivodeship, in east-central Poland. It is the seat of the gmina (administrative district) called Gmina Naruszewo.
