= Skarboszewo, Masovian Voivodeship =

Skarboszewo
- Village
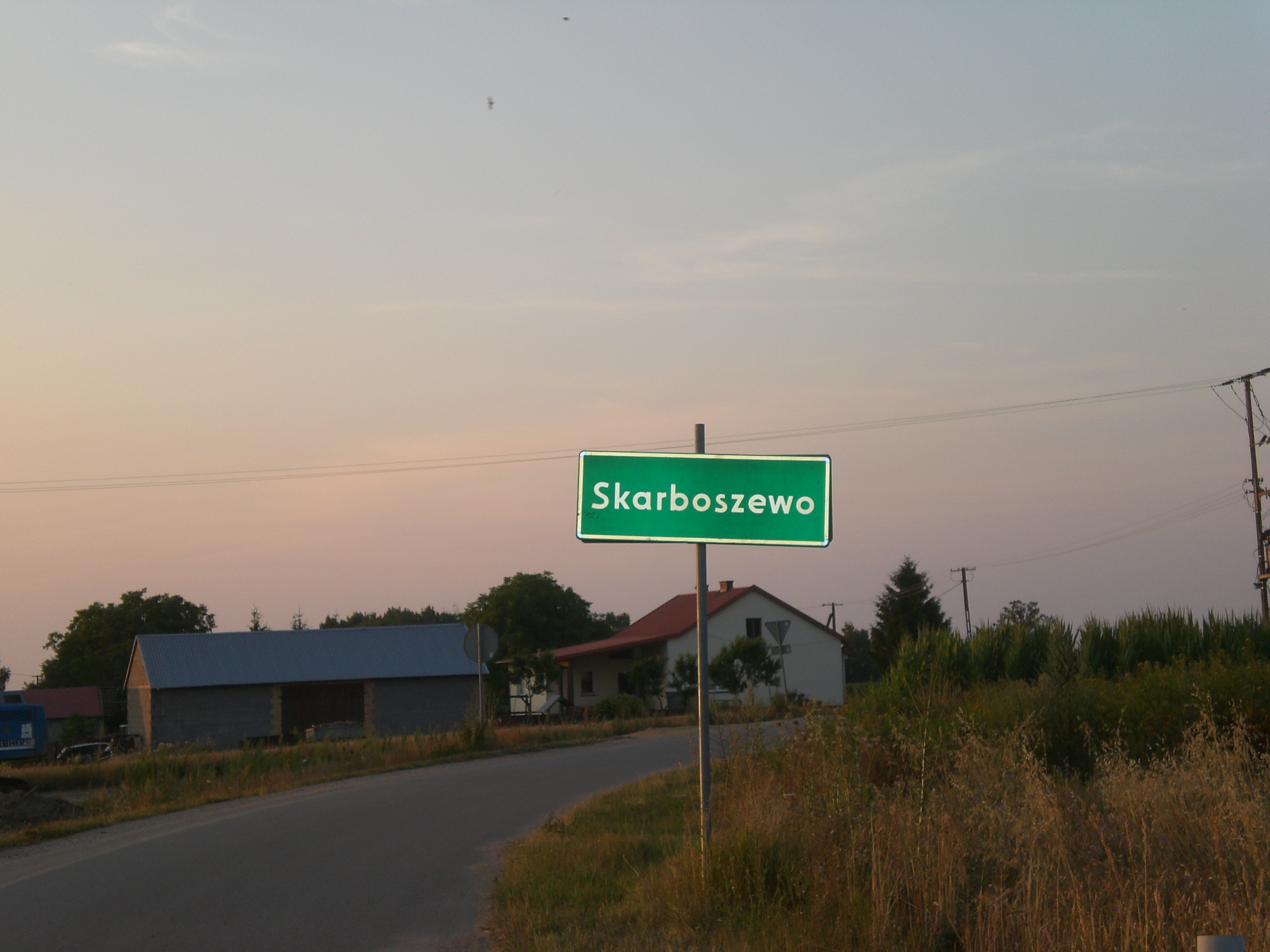

- Location within Poland
- Coordinates: 52°31′44″N 20°19′09″E
- Country: Poland
- Voivodeship: Masovian
- County: Płońsk
- Gmina: Naruszewo

Skarboszewo [skarbɔˈʂɛvɔ] is a village in the administrative district of Gmina Naruszewo, within Płońsk County, Masovian Voivodeship, in east-central Poland.
