= Włościejewice =

- Village
- Location within Poland
- Coordinates: 52°0′N 17°11′E
- Country: Poland
- Voivodeship: Greater Poland
- County: Śrem
- Gmina: Książ Wielkopolski
- Elevation: 110 m (360 ft)
- Population: 198

Włościejewice [vwɔɕt͡ɕɛjɛˈvit͡sɛ] is a village in the administrative district of Gmina Książ Wielkopolski, within Śrem County, Greater Poland Voivodeship, in west-central Poland.
