= Rąbież, Płońsk County =

Rąbież
- Village
- Location within Poland
- Coordinates: 52°30′41″N 20°25′35″E
- Country: Poland
- Voivodeship: Masovian
- County: Płońsk
- Gmina: Naruszewo
- Population: 120

Rąbież [ˈrɔmbjɛʂ] is a village in the administrative district of Gmina Naruszewo, within Płońsk County, Masovian Voivodeship, in east-central Poland.
