= Drochówka =

- Village
- Location within Poland
- Coordinates: 52°30′50″N 20°25′11″E
- Country: Poland
- Voivodeship: Masovian
- County: Płońsk
- Gmina: Naruszewo
- Population (2011): 147
- ZIP Code: 09-152
- Area code: 23
- Vehicle registration: WPN

Drochówka [drɔˈxufka] is a village in the administrative district of Gmina Naruszewo, within Płońsk County, Masovian Voivodeship, in east-central Poland.

From 1975–1998, the town administratively belonged to the Ciechanów Voivodeship.
