= Radzymin, Płońsk County =

Radzymin
- Village
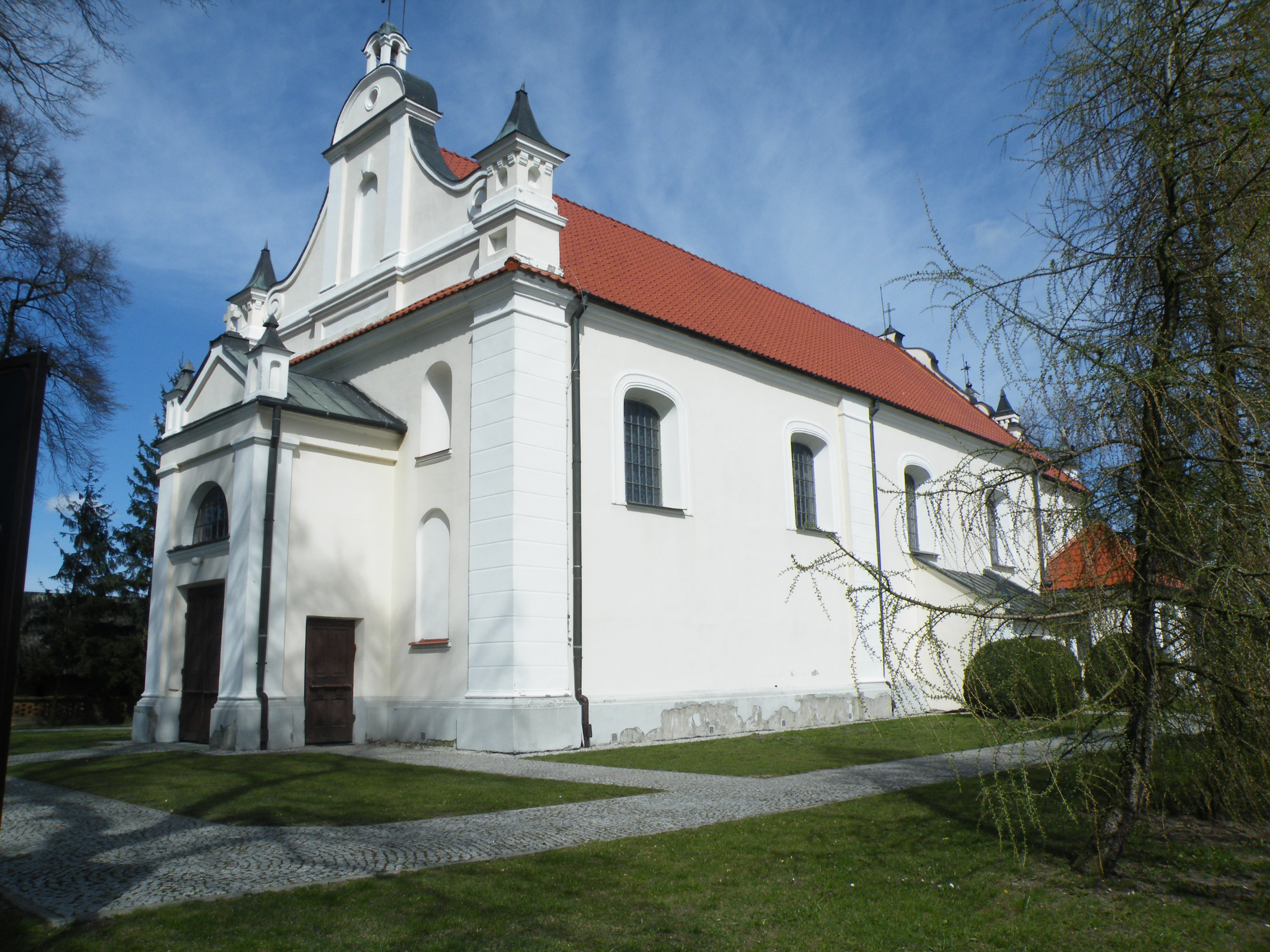
- Saints Peter and Paul church in Radzymin

- Location within Poland
- Coordinates: 52°34′N 20°22′E
- Country: Poland
- Voivodeship: Masovian
- County: Płońsk
- Gmina: Naruszewo
- Time zone: UTC+1 (CET)
  - Summer (DST): UTC+2 (CEST)
- Vehicle registration: WPN

Radzymin (pronounced [raˈd͡zɨ.min]) is a village in the administrative district of Gmina Naruszewo, within Płońsk County, Masovian Voivodeship, in central Poland.
