= Skarszyn, Masovian Voivodeship =

Skarszyn
- Village
- Location within Poland
- Coordinates: 52°31′11″N 20°11′58″E
- Country: Poland
- Voivodeship: Masovian
- County: Płońsk
- Gmina: Naruszewo
- Population: 230

Skarszyn [ˈskarʂɨn] is a village in the administrative district of Gmina Naruszewo, within Płońsk County, Masovian Voivodeship, in east-central Poland.
