= Sroczewo =

- Village
- Location within Poland
- Coordinates: 52°5′N 17°10′E
- Country: Poland
- Voivodeship: Greater Poland
- County: Śrem
- Gmina: Książ Wielkopolski
- Highest elevation: 70 m (230 ft)
- Lowest elevation: 60 m (200 ft)
- Population: 92

Sroczewo [srɔˈt͡ʂɛvɔ] is a village in the administrative district of Gmina Książ Wielkopolski, within Śrem County, Greater Poland Voivodeship, in west-central Poland.
