= Chwałkowo Kościelne =

- Village
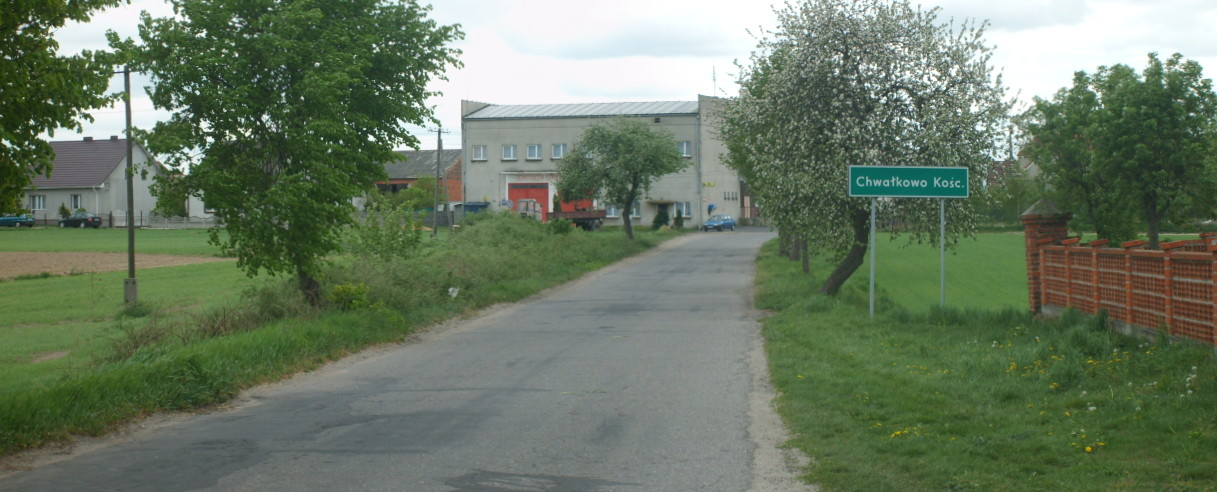

- Location within Poland
- Coordinates: 52°1′N 17°18′E
- Country: Poland
- Voivodeship: Greater Poland
- County: Śrem
- Gmina: Książ Wielkopolski
- Elevation: 90 m (300 ft)
- Population: 752

Chwałkowo Kościelne [xfau̯ˈkɔvɔ kɔɕˈt͡ɕɛlnɛ] is a village in the administrative district of Gmina Książ Wielkopolski, within Śrem County, Greater Poland Voivodeship, in west-central Poland.
