= Roman Sołtyk =

Polish nobleman (szlachcic), political activist and general

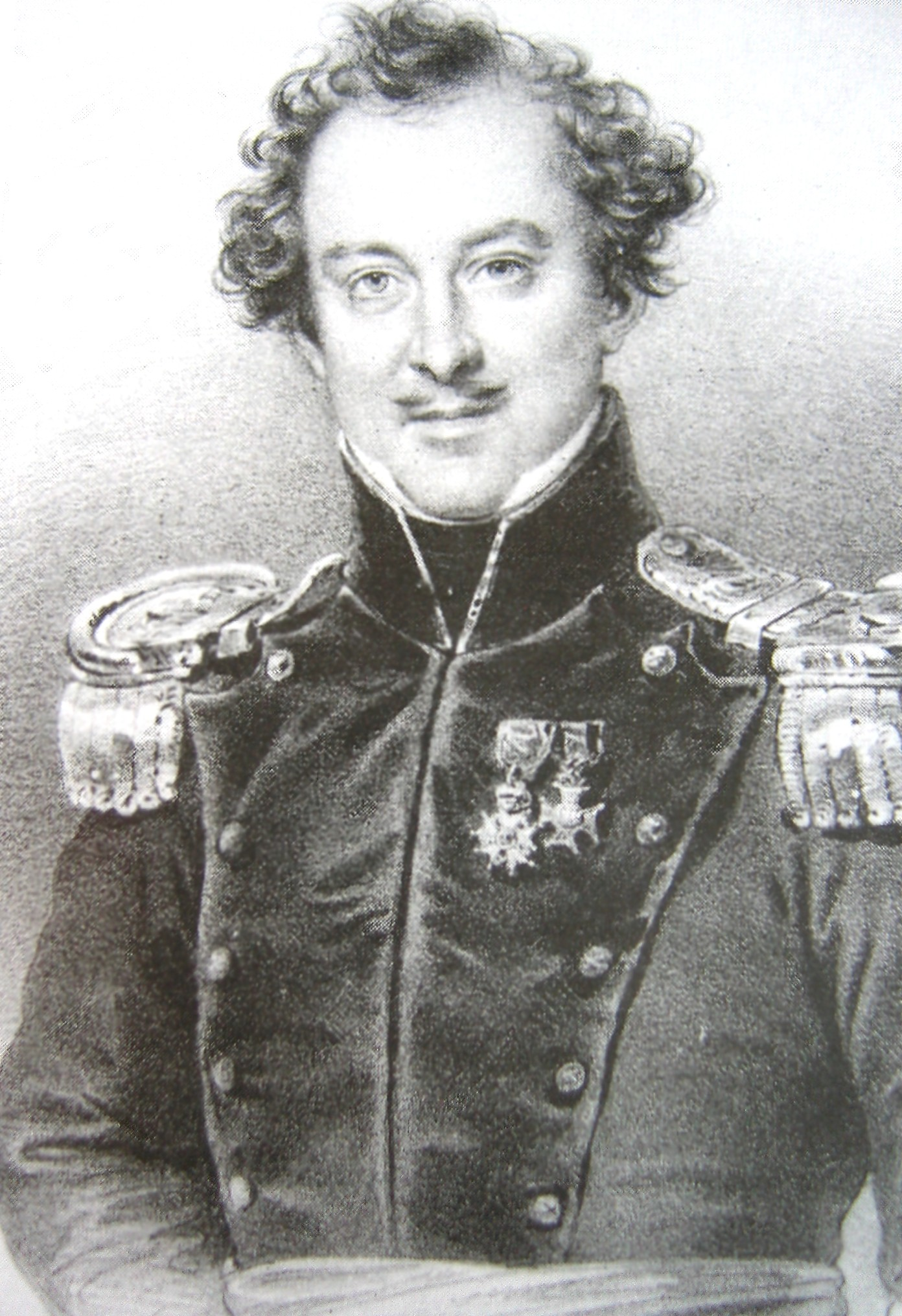

Roman Sołtyk (1790 – 24 October 1843) was a Polish nobleman (szlachcic), political activist and general.

== Biography ==
Born on 1790, in Warsaw, Roman was son of Stanisław Sołtyk. He served as an officer in the Duchy of Warsaw and took part in Napoleon's Russia Campaign. He was a member of secret independence organisations in Russian-occupied Poland. From 1830 to 1831, he served as a member of the Sejm. As Brigadier-General he participated in the November Uprising. Like his father, he became a member of the underground "Patriotic Society". On his motion the Sejm dethroned Czar Nicolas I on 25 January 1831. After the fall of the uprising he went into exile in France. He died in Saint-Germain-en-Laye.

== Bibliography ==
- Sołtyk, Roman (General), Operations of the Polish Army during the 1809 Campaign in Poland. Translated by George F. Nafziger. West Chester, The Nafziger Collection, 2002, (179 p.)
- (fr) La Pologne, précis historique, politique et militaire de sa révolution, précédé d’une esquisse de l’ histoire de la Pologne, depuis son origine jusqu’en 1830 par le comte Roman Sołtyk. Paris 1833, (2 vol.).
- (fr) Napoléon en 1812. Mémoires historiques et militaires sur la campagne de Russie, par le comte Roman Sołtyk, général de brigade d’artillerie polonais, officier supérieur à l’état-major de Napoléon. Paris 1836, (464 p.).
- (fr) Napoléon en 1812. Mémoires du Polonais Roman Sołtyk. [Reprint]. Paris, LCV Services, 2006, (328 p.)
- (fr) Relation des opérations de l'armée aux ordres du Prince Joseph Poniatowski pendant la campagne de 1809 en Pologne contre les Autrichiens par le comte Roman Sołtyk, général de brigade d’artillerie polonais, officier supérieur à l’état-major de Napoléon. Paris 1841, (403 p.).
