= Obreda =

- Settlement
- Location within Poland
- Coordinates: 52°03′05″N 17°08′21″E
- Country: Poland
- Voivodeship: Greater Poland
- County: Śrem
- Gmina: Książ Wielkopolski
- Population: 7

Obreda [ɔˈbrɛda] is a settlement in the administrative district of Gmina Książ Wielkopolski, within Śrem County, Greater Poland Voivodeship, in west-central Poland.
