= Konarzyce, Greater Poland Voivodeship =

Konarzyce
- Village
- Location within Poland
- Coordinates: 52°4′N 17°11′E
- Country: Poland
- Voivodeship: Greater Poland
- County: Śrem
- Gmina: Książ Wielkopolski
- Elevation: 80 m (260 ft)
- Population: 224

Konarzyce [kɔnaˈʐɨt͡sɛ] is a village in the administrative district of Gmina Książ Wielkopolski, within Śrem County, Greater Poland Voivodeship, in west-central Poland.
