= Nowy Nacpolsk =

- Village
- Location within Poland
- Coordinates: 52°31′54″N 20°13′2″E
- Country: Poland
- Voivodeship: Masovian
- County: Płońsk
- Gmina: Naruszewo
- Population: 83

Nowy Nacpolsk [ˈnɔvɨ ˈnat͡spɔlsk] is a village in the administrative district of Gmina Naruszewo, within Płońsk County, Masovian Voivodeship, in east-central Poland.
