= Dłutowo =

- Village
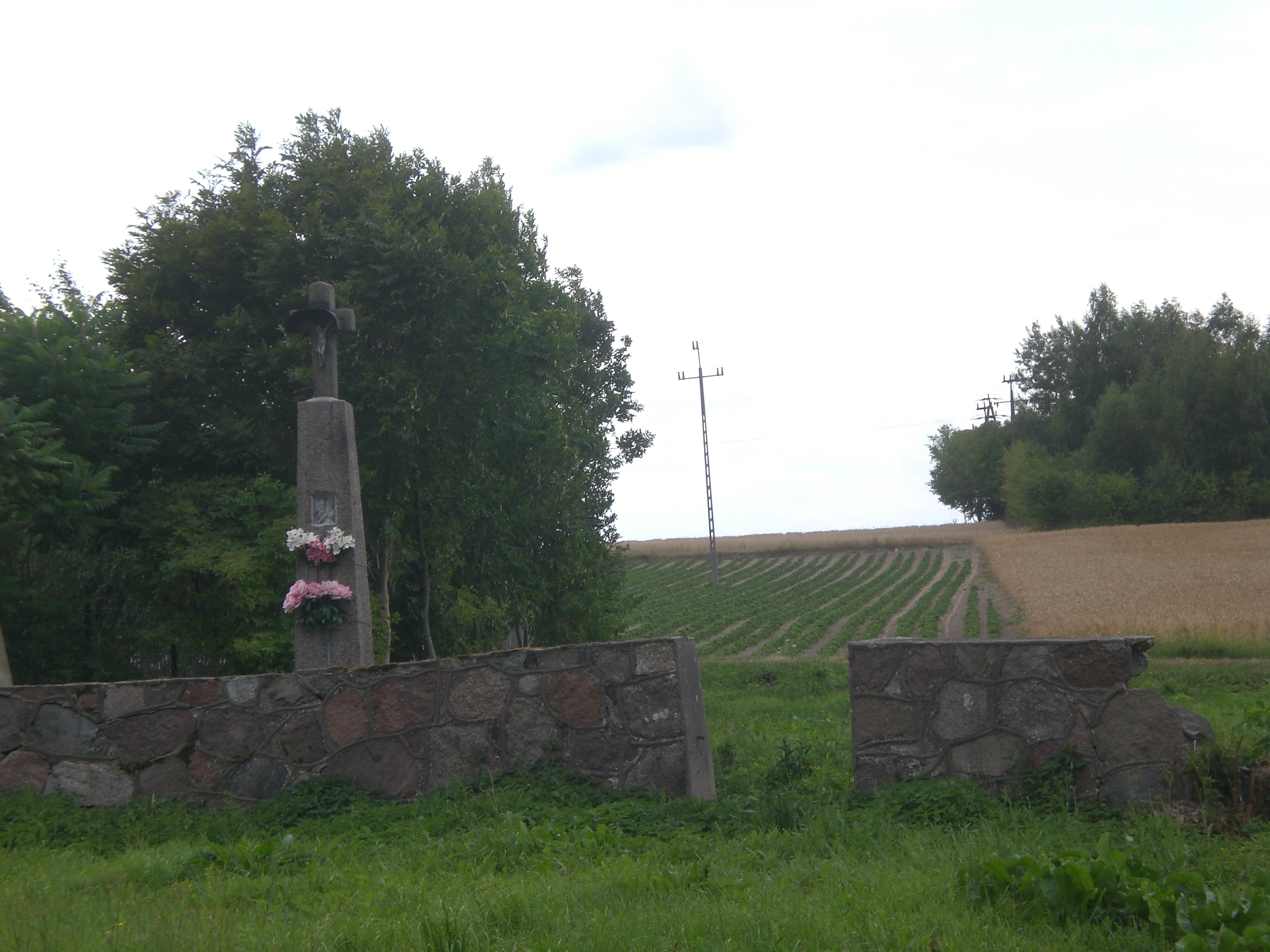

- Location within Poland
- Coordinates: 52°30′N 20°26′E
- Country: Poland
- Voivodeship: Masovian
- County: Płońsk
- Gmina: Naruszewo
- Time zone: UTC+1 (CET)
  - Summer (DST): UTC+2 (CEST)
- Vehicle registration: WPN

Dłutowo [dwuˈtɔvɔ] is a village in the administrative district of Gmina Naruszewo, within Płońsk County, Masovian Voivodeship, in central Poland.

== History ==
Dłutowo was once divided into two villages, Dłutowo Dolne and Dłutowo Górne. In 1827, Dłutowo Dolne had a population of 117, and Dłutowo Górne had a population of 66.
