= Strzembowo =

- Village
- Location within Poland
- Coordinates: 52°30′N 20°24′E
- Country: Poland
- Voivodeship: Masovian
- County: Płońsk
- Gmina: Naruszewo

Strzembowo [stʂɛmˈbɔvɔ] is a village in the administrative district of Gmina Naruszewo, within Płońsk County, Masovian Voivodeship, in east-central Poland.

The Strzembowo Castle - This aristocratic residence of the 19th century is located 68 kilometers out of the Warsaw city line. The construction started in 1870 ordered by duke Hazynski of the Shielings. Designed by Victor Shriter one of the most prosperous Russian architects of that time, whose name is famous worldwide after he created the Vorontsov Palace in Alushta. Originally this area emplaced a 17th-century wooden manor, 1939 to 1940 a German military base located here. From 1949 the palace became an elementary school, where teachers were also housed. And since 2003 a private investor begun the restoration of this glamorous venue. Situated on a small hill the palace is surrounded by an old English park where diverse and valuable are trees surround the lake. The Western wing of the mansion is adjacent to meadows. The palace completes the beauty of this park with exquisite harmony. The lake is the basis of the visual display of the entire estate, bridging the park encircling it and the castle ascending over it. The lake and surrounding park were cleared and renovated in 2005.

The Palace - The central part of the palace is decorated with a two-storey arcade structure. Unusual for the Polish architectural incline, this neat element was borrowed from the Eastern style. The Oriental motifs, fashionable at the time the building was constructed, manifested in the application of exotic elements in the facade composition. Similar tender blend of two different schools of design are seen in the Dzyalinski Palace in Arkugov and the Vorontsov Palace in Alupka (Crimea). The house in built of brick, plastered, decorated with stucco. The total area reaches about 1000 square meters.
