= Troski =

- Village
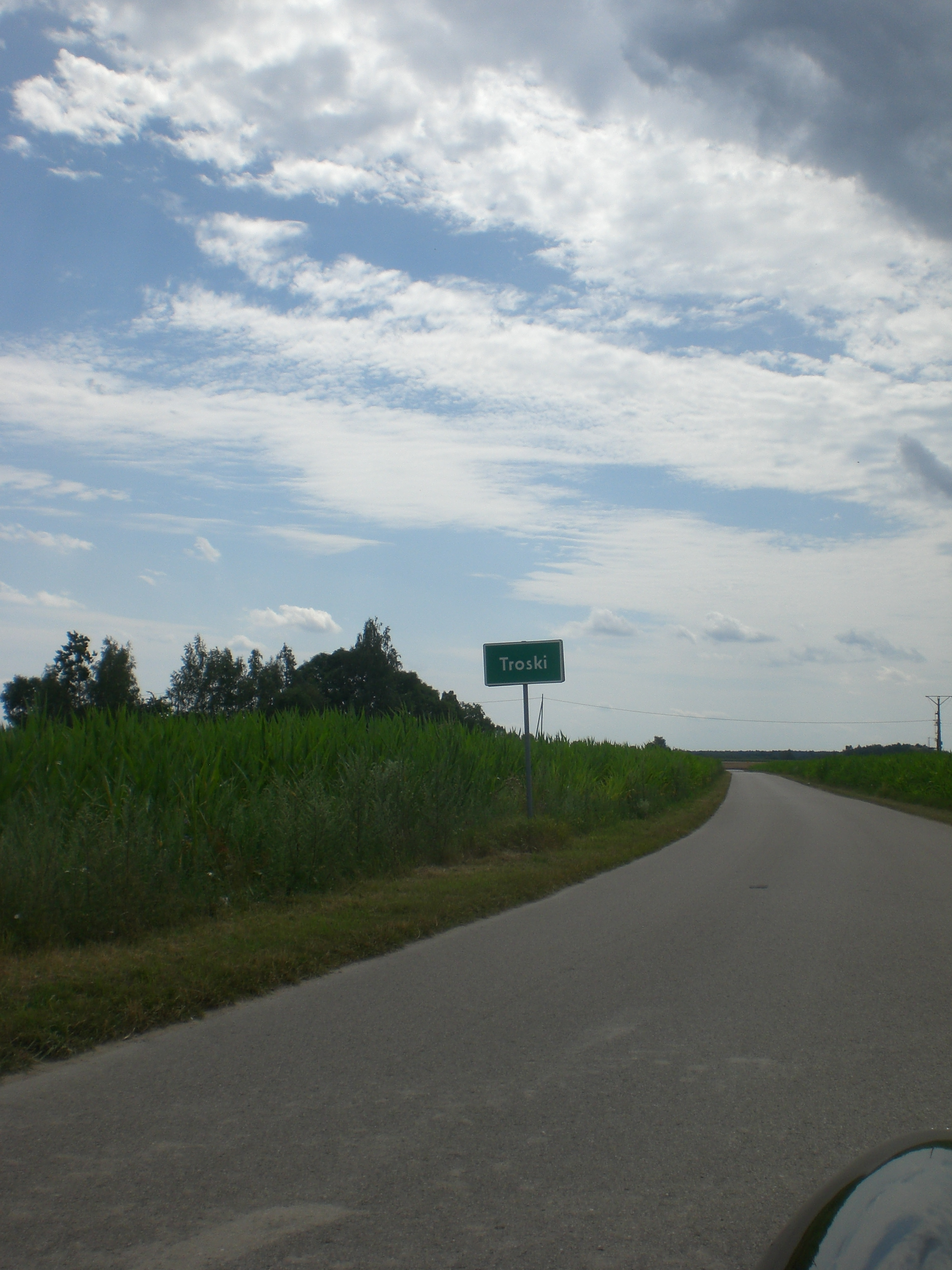

- Location within Poland
- Coordinates: 52°32′59″N 20°19′9″E
- Country: Poland
- Voivodeship: Masovian
- County: Płońsk
- Gmina: Naruszewo

Troski [ˈtrɔski] is a village in the administrative district of Gmina Naruszewo, within Płońsk County, Masovian Voivodeship, in east-central Poland.
