= Świączynek =

- Village
- Location within Poland
- Coordinates: 52°04′51″N 17°18′29″E
- Country: Poland
- Voivodeship: Greater Poland
- County: Śrem
- Gmina: Książ Wielkopolski

Świączynek (Polish pronunciation: [ɕfjɔnˈt͡ʂɨnɛk]) is a village in the administrative district of Gmina Książ Wielkopolski, within Śrem County, Greater Poland Voivodeship, in west-central Poland.
