= Nacpolsk =

- Village
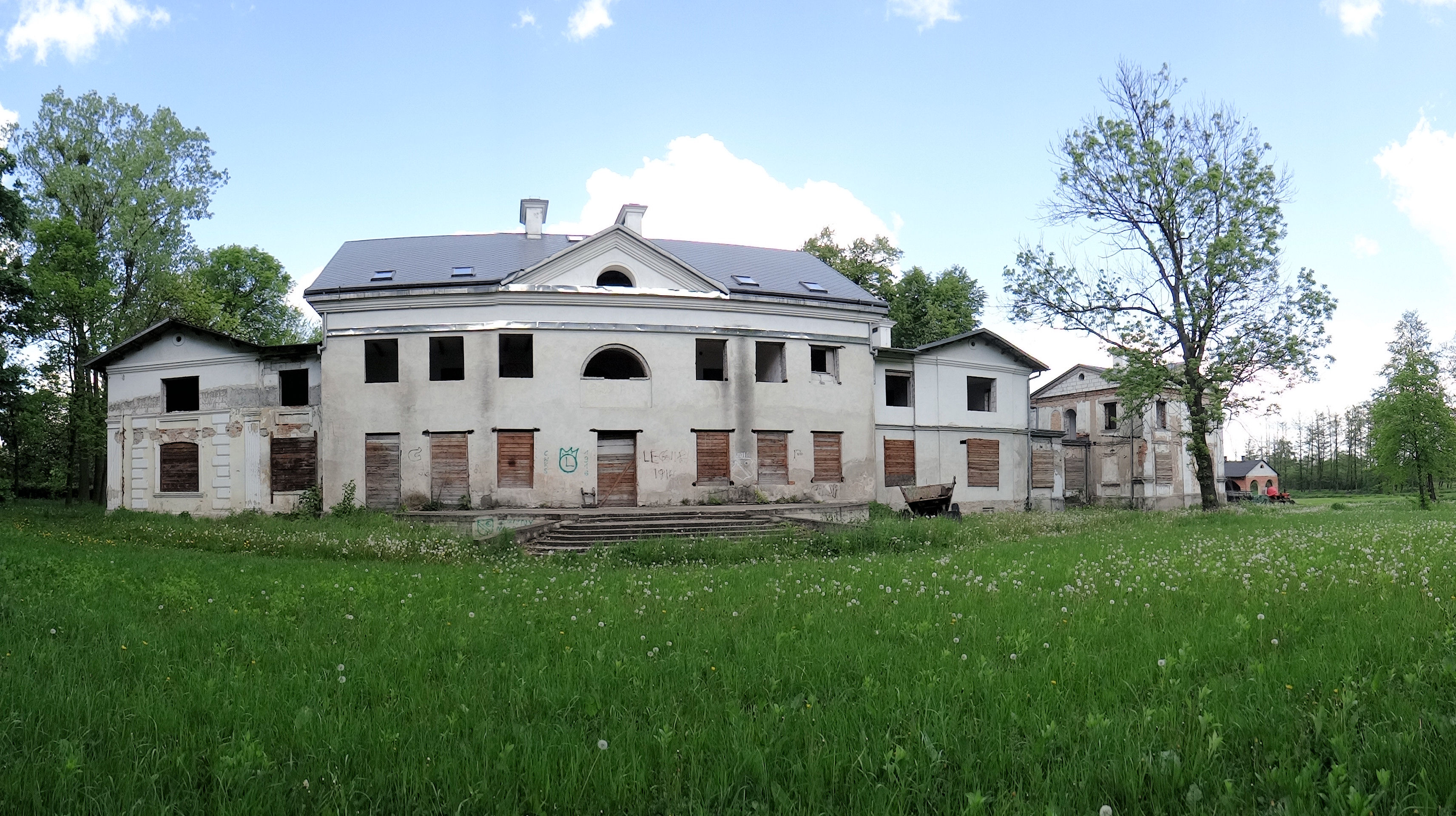
- Palace in Nacpolsk

- Location within Poland
- Coordinates: 52°30′48″N 20°15′25″E
- Country: Poland
- Voivodeship: Masovian
- County: Płońsk
- Gmina: Naruszewo

Population
  - Total: 840

Nacpolsk [ˈnat͡spɔlsk] is a village in the administrative district of Gmina Naruszewo, within Płońsk County, Masovian Voivodeship, in east-central Poland.
