= Stachowo, Płońsk County =

Stachowo
- Village
- Location within Poland
- Coordinates: 52°34′38″N 20°17′32″E
- Country: Poland
- Voivodeship: Masovian
- County: Płońsk
- Gmina: Naruszewo

Stachowo [staˈxɔvɔ] is a village in the administrative district of Gmina Naruszewo, within Płońsk County, Masovian Voivodeship, in east-central Poland.
