= Chrząstowo, Greater Poland Voivodeship =

Chrząstowo
- Village
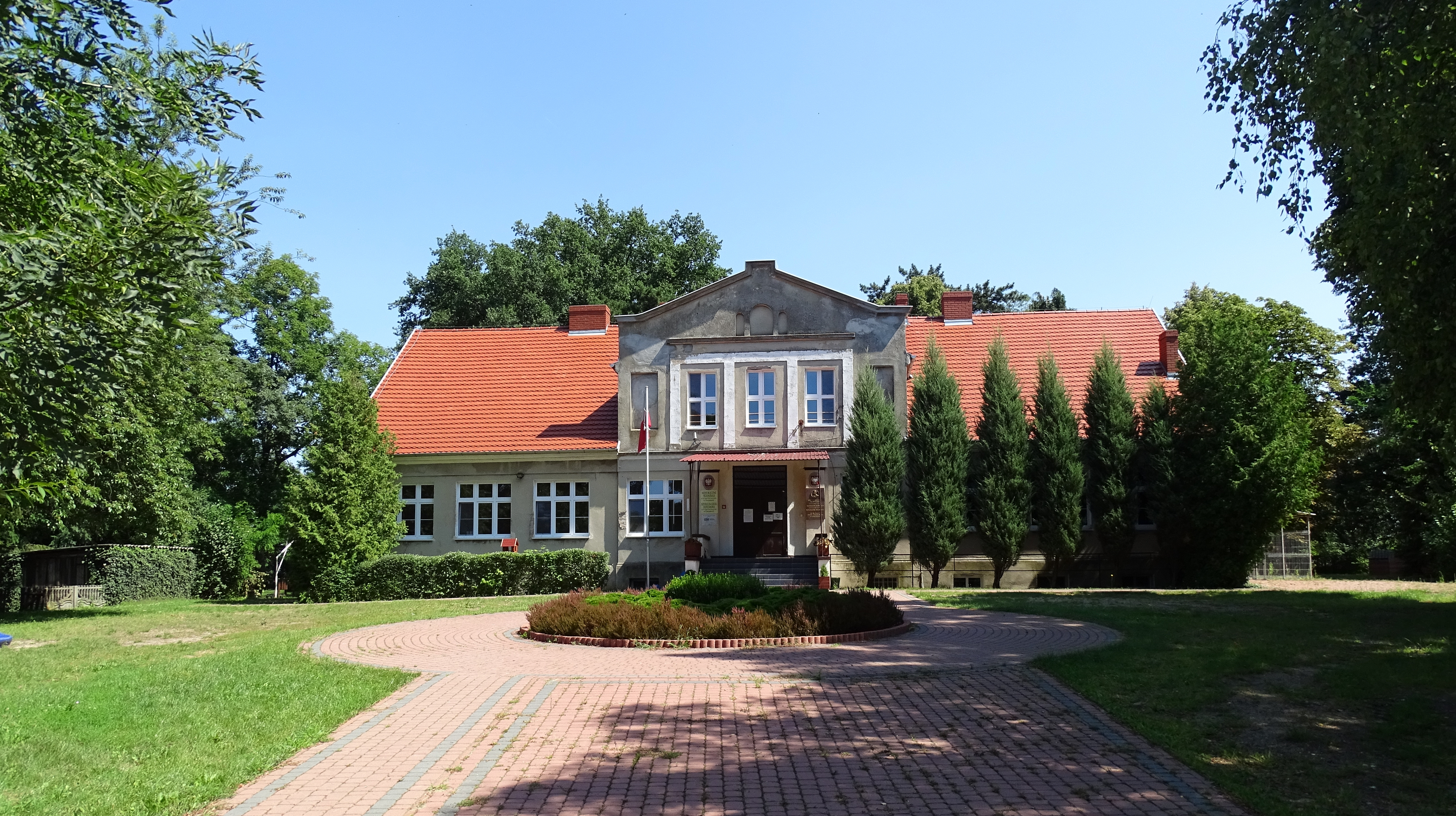
- The manor house, currently used as a school.

- Location within Poland
- Coordinates: 52°4′N 17°8′E
- Country: Poland
- Voivodeship: Greater Poland
- County: Śrem
- Gmina: Książ Wielkopolski
- Highest elevation: 80 m (260 ft)
- Lowest elevation: 70 m (230 ft)
- Population: 420

Chrząstowo [xʂɔ̃sˈtɔvɔ] is a village in the administrative district of Gmina Książ Wielkopolski, within Śrem County, Greater Poland Voivodeship, in west-central Poland.
