= Krysk =

- Village
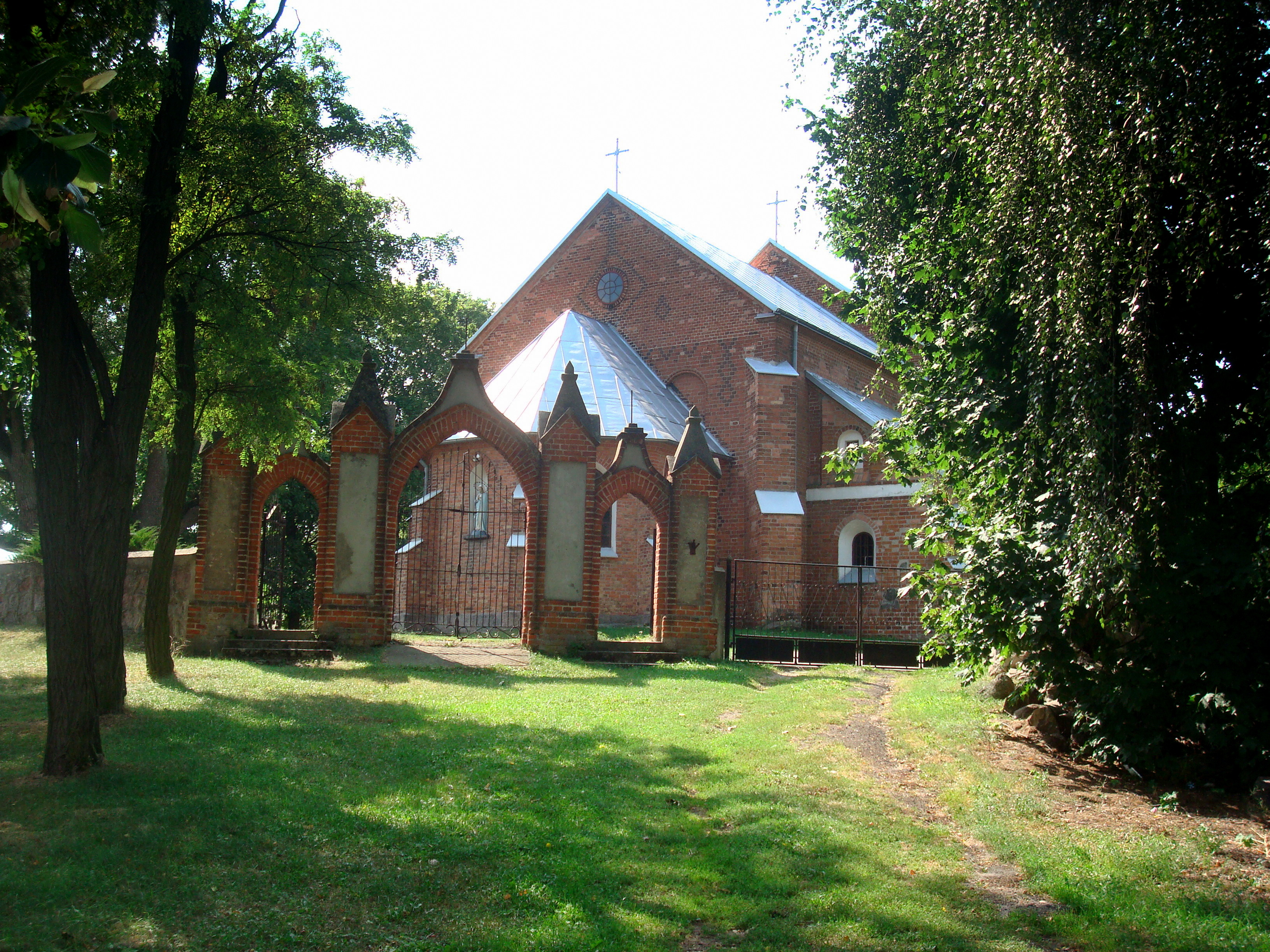
- Church of Saint Florian

- Location within Poland
- Coordinates: 52°32′N 20°25′E
- Country: Poland
- Voivodeship: Masovian
- County: Płońsk
- Gmina: Naruszewo

Population
  - Total: 132 (2,015)

Krysk (Polish pronunciation: [krɨsk]) is a village in the administrative district of Gmina Naruszewo, within Płońsk County, Masovian Voivodeship, in east-central Poland.
