= Kołacin, Greater Poland Voivodeship =

Kołacin
- Village
- Location within Poland
- Coordinates: 52°0′N 17°16′E
- Country: Poland
- Voivodeship: Greater Poland
- County: Śrem
- Gmina: Książ Wielkopolski
- Highest elevation: 100 m (330 ft)
- Lowest elevation: 90 m (300 ft)
- Population: 356

Kołacin [kɔˈwat͡ɕin] is a village in the administrative district of Gmina Książ Wielkopolski, within Śrem County, Greater Poland Voivodeship, in west-central Poland.
