= Zawory, Greater Poland Voivodeship =

Zawory
- Village
- Location within Poland
- Coordinates: 52°4′N 17°9′E
- Country: Poland
- Voivodeship: Greater Poland
- County: Śrem
- Gmina: Książ Wielkopolski
- Highest elevation: 90 m (300 ft)
- Lowest elevation: 80 m (260 ft)
- Population: 101

Zawory [zaˈvɔrɨ] is a village in the administrative district of Gmina Książ Wielkopolski, within Śrem County, Greater Poland Voivodeship, in west-central Poland.

== History ==
Zawory was mentioned in 1397 during an ownership dispute between Sędziwój Zaborowski and Mikołaj of Spław. At the end of the 19th century, four parts of the village were distinguished: a tollbooth by the road (1 chimney, 5 inhabitants), a farm village (4 chimneys, 25 inhabitants, of which 11 were Evangelical), the manor property of Zawory Szlacheckie (area 460 ha, 10 chimneys, 136 inhabitants) [ 5 ] and a single building by the peat mine (2 inhabitants). Zawory frequently changed owners (the Chodacki family, Leon Masłowski, Hertzog, the Żyć brothers, from 1855 Józef Dzierzbicki, and from 1891 the Raczyński family ). In the years 1975–1998 the town administratively belonged to the Poznań Voivodeship.

Ethnographers noted the characteristic costumes of the local population and wedding customs typical of the region.
