= Kiełczyn, Greater Poland Voivodeship =

Kiełczyn
- Village
- Location within Poland
- Coordinates: 52°3′N 17°13′E
- Country: Poland
- Voivodeship: Greater Poland
- County: Śrem
- Gmina: Książ Wielkopolski
- Highest elevation: 80 m (260 ft)
- Lowest elevation: 70 m (230 ft)
- Population: 125

Kiełczyn [ˈkʲɛu̯t͡ʂɨn] is a village in the administrative district of Gmina Książ Wielkopolski, Śrem County, Greater Poland Voivodeship, in west-central Poland.
