= Zakrzewo, Śrem County =

Zakrzewo
- Village
- Location within Poland
- Coordinates: 52°5′N 17°14′E
- Country: Poland
- Voivodeship: Greater Poland
- County: Śrem
- Gmina: Książ Wielkopolski

Zakrzewo [zaˈkʂɛvɔ] is a village in the administrative district of Gmina Książ Wielkopolski, within Śrem County, Greater Poland Voivodeship, in west-central Poland.
