= Walenty Dymek =

Polish archbishop

- Archbishop of Poznań
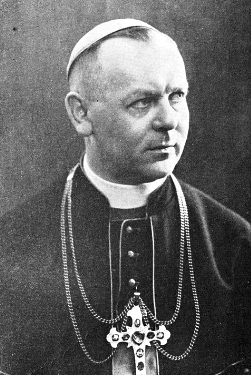
- Church: Catholic Church
- Archdiocese: Archdiocese of Poznań
- In office: 12 November 1948 – 22 October 1956
- Predecessor: Himself (as Archbishop of Gniezno and Poznań)
- Successor: Antoni Baraniak
- Previous posts: Archbishop of Gniezno and Poznań (1946-1948); Titular Archbishop of Nicopolis in Epiro (1945-1946); Titular Bishop of Madytus (1929-1945); Auxiliary Bishop of Gniezno and Poznań (1929-1946)

Orders
- Ordination: 11 February 1912
- Consecration: 26 May 1929 by August Hlond

Personal details
- Born: 31 December 1888 Güldenau, Province of Posen, Kingdom of Prussia, German Empire
- Died: 22 October 1956 (aged 67) Poznań, Poznań Voivodeship, Polish People's Republic

Walenty Dymek (1888–1956) was the Archbishop of Poznań from 1946 to 1956.

He was born on 31 December 1888 in Połajewo, was Auxiliary Bishop of Poznań in the years 1929–1946, and was Archbishop of Poznań from 1946 to 1956.

He died 22 October 1956 in Poznań.

Religious titles
Preceded by August Hlond	Archbishop of Poznań; 1946–1956–1977	Succeeded by Antoni Baraniak
