= Zaborowo, Śrem County =

Zaborowo
- Village
- Location within Poland
- Coordinates: 52°5′N 17°12′E
- Country: Poland
- Voivodeship: Greater Poland
- County: Śrem
- Gmina: Książ Wielkopolski
- Elevation: 70 m (230 ft)
- Population: 254

Zaborowo ([zabɔˈrɔvɔ]; German: Zaborowo, 1939–45 Hermannsdorf) is a village in the administrative district of Gmina Książ Wielkopolski, within Śrem County, Greater Poland Voivodeship, in west-central Poland.
