= Krzysztof Budzyń =

Polish historian

Krzysztof Budzyń (born 4 September 1957) is a Polish entrepreneur and amateur historian, specializing in the history of the Śrem region in western Poland, and author of many publications on this subject.

== Education and business career ==
Krzysztof Budzyń was born in Śrem, Poland. Since his birth, he has been living in his home village Binkowo near Śrem. After finishing elementary school in Pysząca, he attended Gen. Józef Wybicki High School in Śrem. After passing his matura school leaving examinations, he was studying at the Chemical Engineering Faculty of Szczecin University of Technology, where he was awarded a Master of Science degree.

After graduating from university, he worked for companies of the chemical industry for some time; in the late 1980s he decided to start his own business. In 1990, he opened a wholesale company dealing in household chemicals and cosmetics; in 1995 he extended his business to include a chain of retail outlets.

== Work as a regional historian ==
Despite his technical background and running a trading company, Krzysztof Budzyń has been interested in humanities, especially history and literature, for many years; occasionally he is also engaged in literary work himself.

He made his debut as early as 1981 in Szpilki (Pins), a Polish magazine of humour and satire, as an author of limericks. Since the early 1990s he has been writing articles on regional history to local newspapers and the periodical Pierwiosnek (Primrose) published by the Gen. Józef Wybicki High School in Śrem. He is a bibliophile and collector of historical mementoes – old maps, documents, photographs, postcards, mainly from the Śrem region, covering the territory of present Śrem County and the neighbouring communes of Kórnik and Mosina, which were part of Śrem County in the past.

Since 2008, Krzysztof Budzyń has been publishing Śremski Notatnik Historyczny (Śrem Historical Notebook), a "magazine for lovers of the Śrem region", a periodical published irregularly, featuring articles on the history of the region and its eminent citizens. Six volumes of Śremski Notatnik Historyczny have been published so far. Krzysztof Budzyń is the publisher, editor-in-chief and author of a great deal of texts in the magazine.

Part of his collections was displayed at the exhibition "Moja Ziemia Śremska (ze zbiorów Krzysztofa Budzynia)" ("My Śrem Region – Krzysztof Budzyń's collections") in the Raczyński Library in Poznań from 25 November 2010 to 31 January 2011.

== Publications ==
- Śremski Notatnik Historyczny (Śrem Historical Notebook) − periodical published since 2008 (vol. 1−6)
- Legendy ze Śremu i okolic (Legends from Śrem and Environs) (2008)
- Słownik biograficzny Śremu (Śrem's Biographical Dictionary) (2008) − co-author
- Christian Parma, Kórnik − Treasurehouse of Culture and Nature − author of the chapter on Kórnik's environs
- Nasz Dolsk − dawne widoki miasta i okolicy (Our Dolsk – Old Views of Town and Vicinity) (2009)
- Książ Wielkopolski - miasto i okolica na dawnych pocztówkach i fotografiach (Książ Wielkopolski - The Town and Vicinity on Old Postcards and Photographs) (2011)

== Bibliography ==
- Moja Ziemia Śremska (ze zbiorów Krzysztofa Budzynia) (My Śrem Region – Krzysztof Budzyń's collections) − catalogue of the exhibition at the Raczyński Library in Poznań
