= Szuman =

Szuman is a surname. Notable people with the surname include:

- Henryk Szuman (1882–1939), Polish martyr and saint, brother of Wanda
- Leon Szuman, Polish surgeon, poet, and social activist
- Wanda Szuman (1890-1994), Polish educator, sister of Henryk

== Fictional characters ==
- Michał Szuman, from the novel The Doll by Bolesław Prus
