= Barbarki =

- Settlement
- Location within Poland
- Coordinates: 52°5′N 16°54′E
- Country: Poland
- Voivodeship: Greater Poland
- County: Śrem
- Gmina: Śrem
- Elevation: 90 m (300 ft)

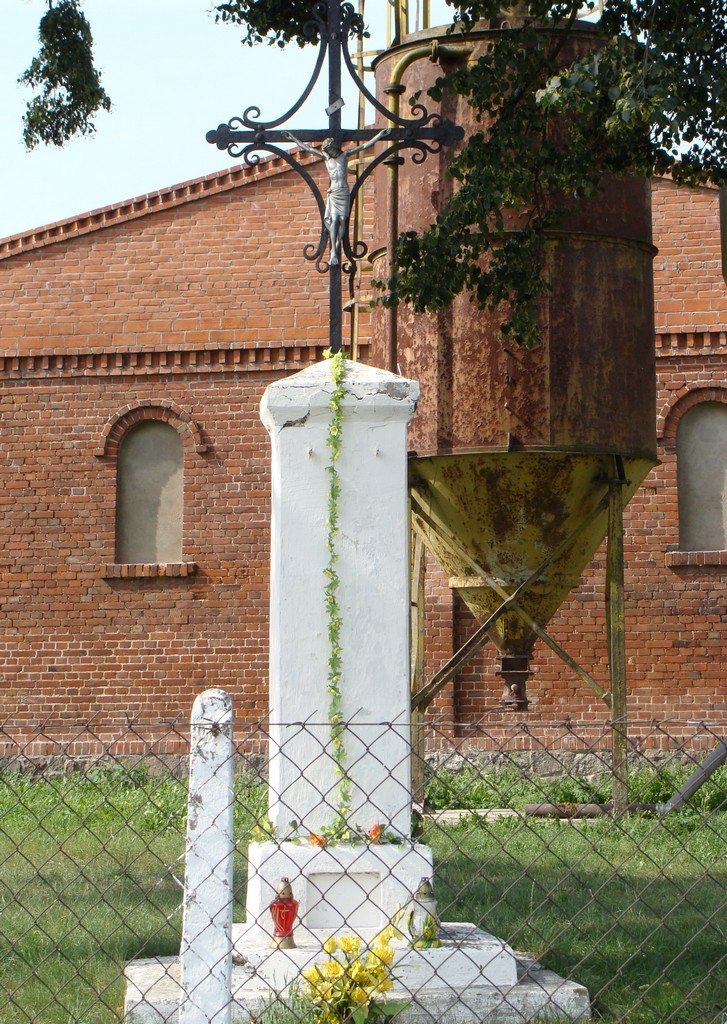
Roadside shrine

Barbarki [barˈbarki] is a settlement in the administrative district of Gmina Śrem, within Śrem County, Greater Poland Voivodeship, in west-central Poland.
