= Mateuszewo =

- Village
- Location within Poland
- Coordinates: 52°8′N 17°7′E
- Country: Poland
- Voivodeship: Greater Poland
- County: Śrem
- Gmina: Śrem
- Elevation: 80 m (260 ft)
- Population: 60

Mateuszewo [matɛuˈʂɛvɔ] is a village in the administrative district of Gmina Śrem, within Śrem County, Greater Poland Voivodeship, in west-central Poland.
