= Kawcze =

Kawcze may refer to the following places in Poland:

- Kawcze, Pomeranian Voivodeship (north Poland)
- Kawcze, Greater Poland Voivodeship (west-central Poland)
- Kawcze, Śrem County in Greater Poland Voivodeship (west-central Poland)
