= Sosnowiec (disambiguation) =

Sosnowiec may refer to the following places:

- Sosnowiec Ghetto
- Sosnowiec, Piotrków County in Łódź Voivodeship (central Poland)
- Sosnowiec, Podlaskie Voivodeship (north-east Poland)
- Sosnowiec in Silesian Voivodeship (south Poland)
- Sosnowiec, Zgierz County in Łódź Voivodeship (central Poland)
- Sosnowiec, Świętokrzyskie Voivodeship (south-central Poland)
- Sosnowiec, Greater Poland Voivodeship (west-central Poland)

== See also ==
- Sosnowice (disambiguation)
