= Hermann Schreiber =

German doctor of philosophy, rabbi and journalist

Hermann Schreiber (21 August 1882 in Schrimm, Prussian Posen province, German Empire – 27 September 1954 in West Berlin, Allied-occupied Berlin) was a German doctor of philosophy, rabbi and journalist.

== Youth ==
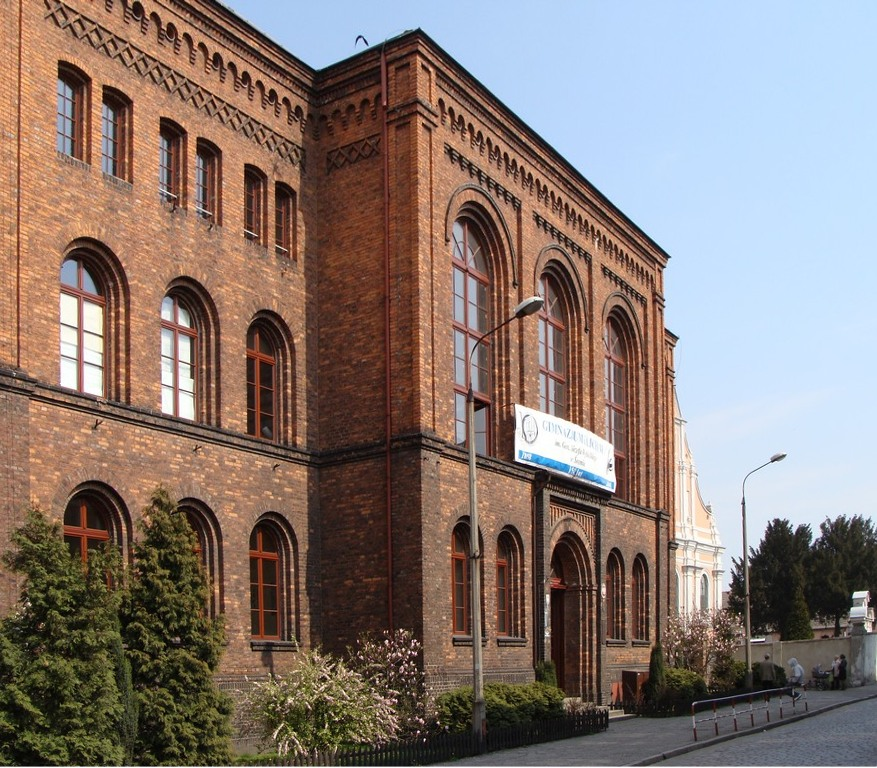
High School in Śrem, which Hermann Schreiber attended

Hermann Schreiber descended from a Jewish family which was settled in Schrimm in the Prussian Province of Posen (modern-day Śrem in Poland). The family was already Germanized in his times (in the second half of the 19th century the Jewish community in the Prussian Partition of former Poland generally adopted German culture and language). Hermann's father, Pedasur Schreiber, taught religion in the Jewish school and was an assistant to the rabbi; whereas his mother, Balbina née Schreier, managed the household.

Hermann was the youngest and the only son of their five children. After passing his Abitur examination in the High School in Śrem in 1901, he was studying at the Jewish Theological Seminary of Breslau in Breslau, where he was ordained a rabbi, then at the University of Breslau, where he earned a degree of Doctor of Philosophy. In around 1910 he married Charlotte Neumann, with whom he had one son – Paul.

== Activity in Germany ==
During the years 1912–1938, Hermann Schreiber lived in Potsdam. He wrote articles in newspapers (incl. Israelitisches Familienblatt), translated the Torah from Hebrew into German, for many years was the rabbi in the synagogue in Potsdam. He was the chairman of the Jewish Liberal Youth Association, which was established in Potsdam in 1921; he was also an active member of the Berlin Association of Schrimmers (Verein der Schrimmer zu Berlin), an organisation established in 1902 by people from Schrimm who had migrated to Berlin.

== Emigration to Britain ==
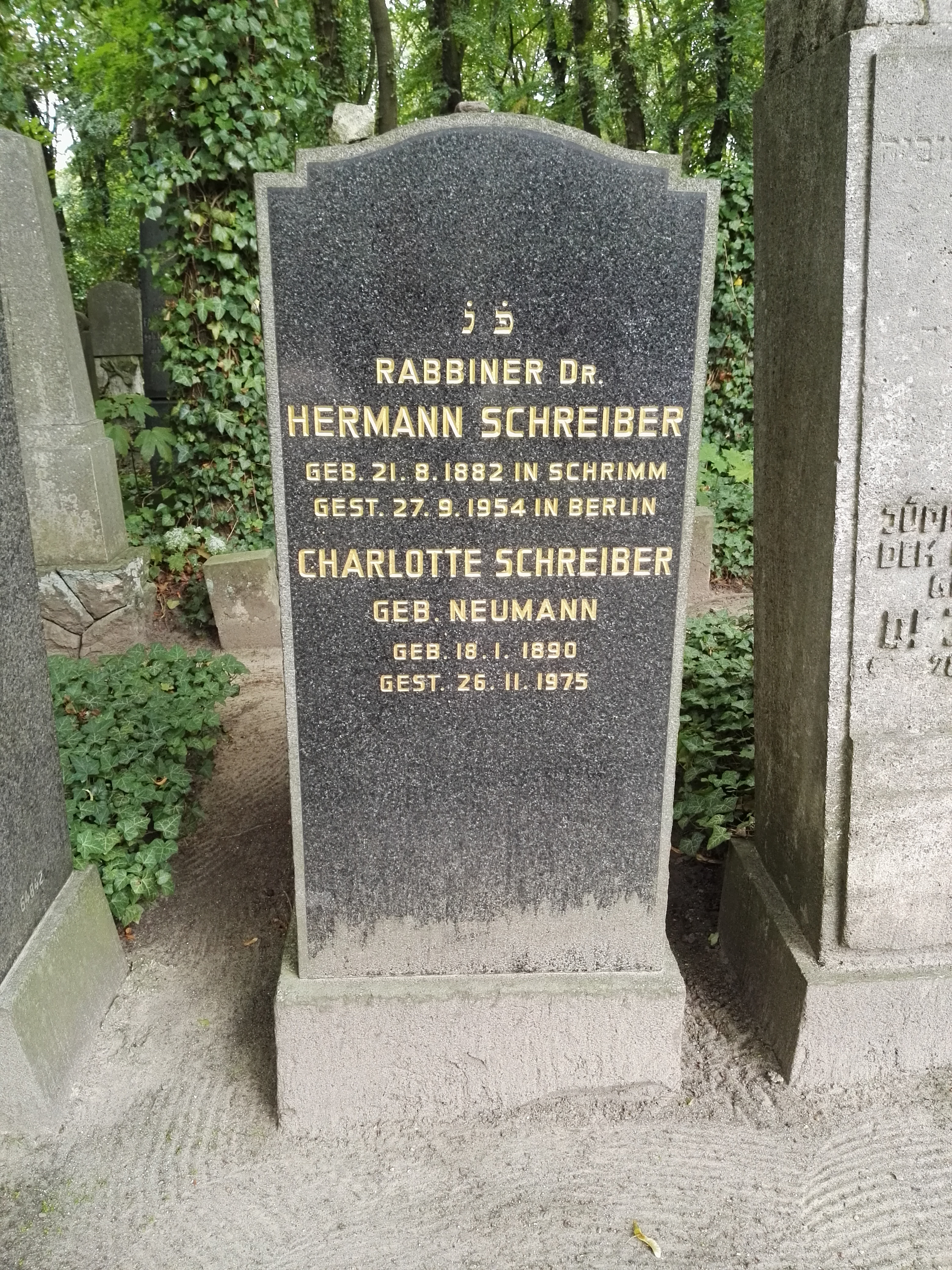
Graves of Charlotte and Hermann Schreiber, Weißensee Cemetery, Berlin, 2016

When the Nazis took power in Weimar Germany in 1933, Hermann Schreiber, like other Jewish Germans, was subjected to persecutions. In 1938, during Kristallnacht, he witnessed the demolition of the Potsdam synagogue. Shortly afterwards he was put in Sachsenhausen concentration camp. At the beginning of 1939, after his release from the camp, he managed to emigrate with his wife and son to the United Kingdom, where he lived in London. He continued his journalistic work, writing articles in English, contributed to the work of the Beth din (house of judgment) of the Association of Synagogues in Great Britain.

He also participated in the life of the Jewish community in Amsterdam, and from 1952 on he visited West Berlin, where he took part in the celebrations of the Rosh Hashanah (Jewish New Year). During one of those visits, he died during the celebrations, immediately after preaching a sermon in the Pestalozzistrasse Synagogue in West Berlin. Hermann Schreiber was buried at the Jewish Weißensee Cemetery in then East Berlin.

== Memories ==
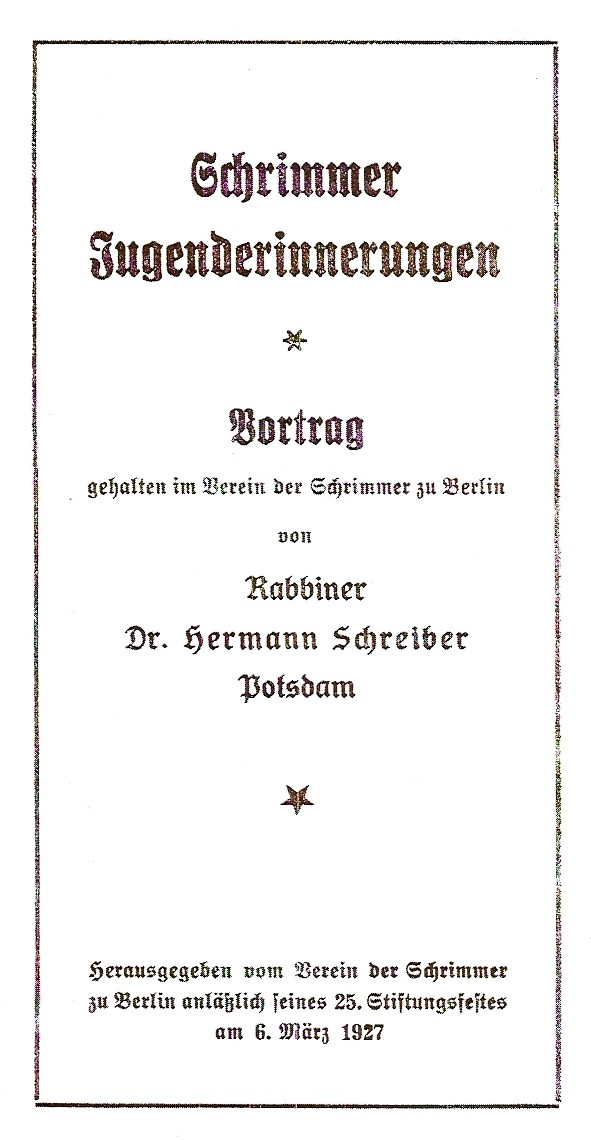
First edition of Hermann Schreiber's Schrimm – Memories from Our Youth

On 6 March 1927, on the occasion of the 25th anniversary of the Association of Schrimmers, Hermann Schreiber delivered a lecture, which was later published in print as Schrimmer Jugenderinnerungen (Schrimm – Memories from Our Youth'). The memories are a valuable source for research on the history of Jews in the Province of Posen. Schreiber describes in the memories the daily life of his own family and other Jews living in Śrem, Jewish traditions, customs and festivals, but also the daily life of ethnic Poles and ethnic Germans who lived in Śrem. The memories were translated into English. In 2008 the memories were also translated into Polish and published by Krzysztof Budzyń in the journal "Śremski Notatnik Historyczny" (Śrem Historical Notebook).
