= Marianowo =

Marianowo may refer to:

- Marianowo, Rypin County in Kuyavian-Pomeranian Voivodeship (north-central Poland)
- Marianowo, Gmina Strzegowo in Masovian Voivodeship (east-central Poland)
- Marianowo, Podlaskie Voivodeship (north-east Poland)
- Marianowo, Gmina Szydłowo in Masovian Voivodeship (east-central Poland)
- Marianowo, Gmina Wieczfnia Kościelna in Masovian Voivodeship (east-central Poland)
- Marianowo, Przasnysz County in Masovian Voivodeship (east-central Poland)
- Marianowo, Wyszków County in Masovian Voivodeship (east-central Poland)
- Marianowo, Czarnków-Trzcianka County in Greater Poland Voivodeship (west-central Poland)
- Marianowo, the former German name for Marylin, Greater Poland Voivodeship (also in Czarnków-Trzcianka County; west-central Poland)
- Marianowo, Gmina Sompolno in Greater Poland Voivodeship (west-central Poland)
- Marianowo, Gmina Ślesin in Greater Poland Voivodeship (west-central Poland)
- Marianowo, Międzychód County in Greater Poland Voivodeship (west-central Poland)
- Marianowo, Szamotuły County in Greater Poland Voivodeship (west-central Poland)
- Marianowo, Gmina Dominowo, Środa County in Greater Poland Voivodeship (west-central Poland)
- Marianowo, Śrem County in Greater Poland Voivodeship (west-central Poland)
- Marianowo, Lubusz Voivodeship (west Poland)
- Marianowo, Pomeranian Voivodeship (north Poland)
- Marianowo, West Pomeranian Voivodeship (north-west Poland)
