= Psarskie =

Psarskie may refer to the following places in Poland:

- Psarskie, a neighbourhood near Kiekrz in the Jeżyce district of Poznań
- Psarskie, Szamotuły County
- Psarskie, Śrem County
