= Cezary Plater =

Cezary Augustyn Plater
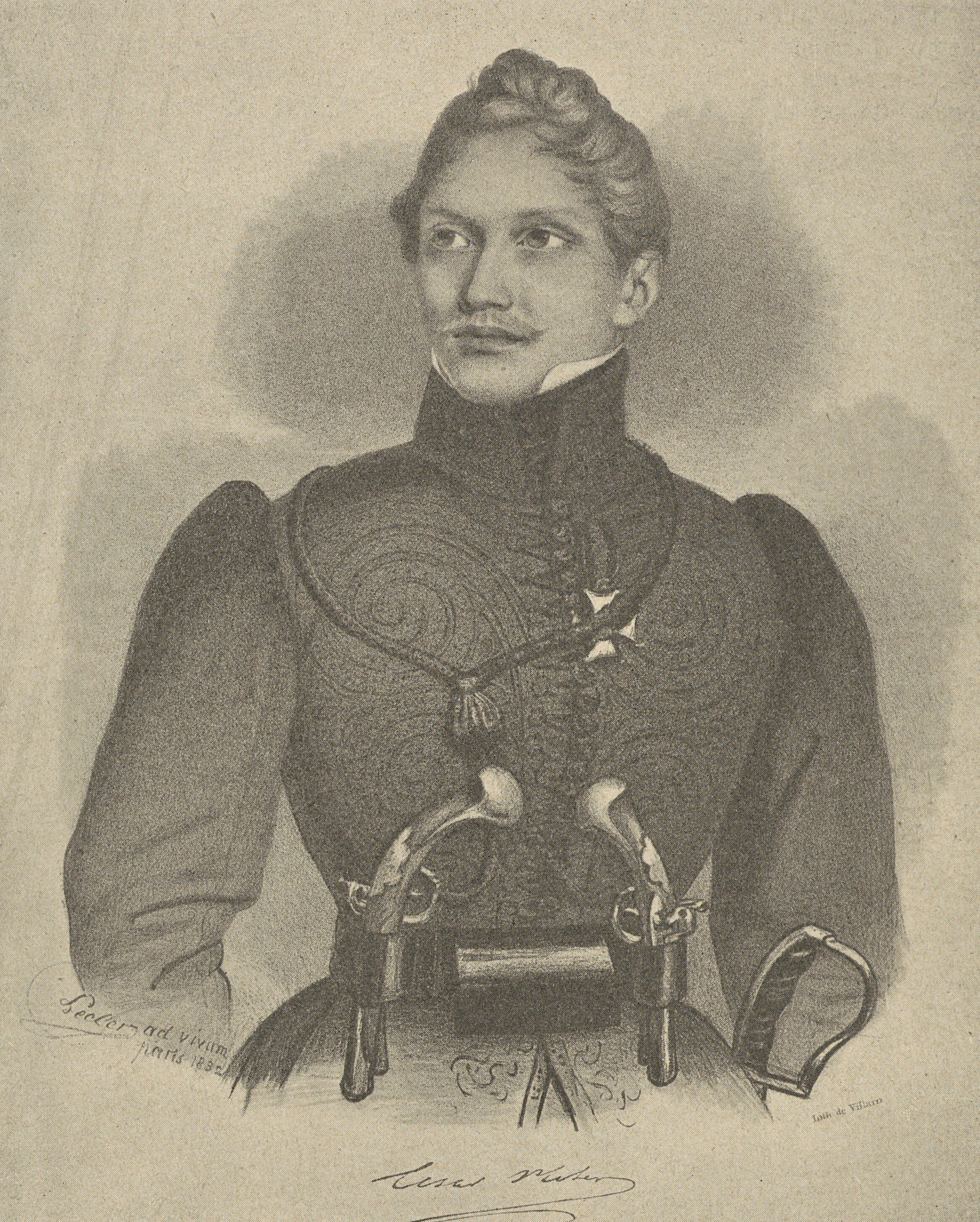
- Born: 5 September 1810; Vilnius, Russian Empire
- Died: 9 February 1869 (aged 58); Góra, Kingdom of Prussia

Cezary Augustyn Plater (5 September 1810 – 9 February 1869) was a participant in the November Uprising and Polish émigré activist. He was brother of Władysław Plater and cousin of Emilia Plater.

== Biography ==
=== November Uprising ===
He was the son of Kazimierz Plater, owner of the Dusiaty estate, and Eleonora Apolinara née Żaba. He completed his education in Vilnius and was studying in Berlin when he learned about the outbreak of the November Uprising. He returned to Lithuania and participated in a partisan campaign in the Ukmergė district, alongside his cousin Emilia Plater. During the uprising, he served as a captain of the Samogitian cavalry. He fought in the corps of General Dezydery Chłapowski. He did not cross the Prussian border with Chłapowski, but sneaked to Warsaw with Emilia Plater, whom he had to leave ill on the way. In Warsaw he signed the accession of the citizens of the Vilnius Voivodeship to the uprising on August 10, 1831. On August 12 he was elected deputy from the Vilnius powiat, and sat in the Sejm until its last session on September 23 in Płock.

=== Exile ===
In November 1831, he arrived in France and settled in Paris. In December of that year, he joined the Lithuanian and Ruthenian Lands Society, later becoming its president. He was a member of many other institutions, including the Society for Scientific Assistance to Polish Youth, the Historical-Literary Society in Paris, and the Polish National Committee. Politically, he was associated with the Hôtel Lambert faction.

He was also a member of the insurgent parliament in exile. On December 19, 1834, he signed the founding act of the United Brothers Masonic lodge and contributed to the establishment of Bohdan Jański's house. From 1837 to 1838, he stayed in Dresden, but under pressure from the Russians, he returned to Paris on May 4, 1838. In December 1838, he arrived in Rome as an agent of Prince Adam Jerzy Czartoryski and met with Pope Gregory XVI. In January 1840, he returned to Paris again.

In the first quarter of 1842, he assisted Zygmunt Krasiński in caring for his dying friend, Konstanty Danielewicz. The poet repaid Plater with a poetic letter entitled Jeślim ci kiedy był przykro przeciwny...

=== Return to Poland and later life ===
In 1842, Plater arrived in Greater Poland, where he bought the Góra estate in the Śrem district. He founded and managed several charitable institutions, including the St. Vincent de Paul Society, an orphanage, an elderly care home, a hospital, a savings and loan fund, and a farming circle. On October 2, 1842, he married Stefania Małachowska. In April 1846, he was forced to leave Greater Poland and later stayed in Berlin, Paris, and Wrocław. In 1850, he founded the Polish Brotherhood, a continuation of the dissolved Polish League, which lasted until 1853. His wife died in 1852, and their children inherited numerous estates in the Kingdom of Poland. In 1857, he was granted amnesty by the Tsar. In 1862, he remarried, this time to a Catholic Russian woman, Julia Bobrińska, who had helped insurgents during the January Uprising. In 1862, Plater became a member of the Tax Association.

== Family ==
On October 2, 1843, he married Stefania Małachowska in Dresden, who came from a powerful and wealthy family. She was the daughter of Ludwik Jakub Małachowski and Ludwika née Komar, and the granddaughter of Antoni Małachowski, the Voivode of Masovia and Grand Crown Secretary during the reign of King Stanisław August. Together, they had five children: Ludwik Kazimierz, Maria, Jadwiga Stefania, Kazimierz, and Józef. The two youngest sons did not reach adulthood. The daughters, Maria and Jadwiga Stefania, married into prominent princely families, respectively to Stanisław Światopełk-Czetwertyński and Karol Wilhelm Radziwiłł. Stefania died young in 1852, after which the children inherited the vast Małachowski estates in Congress Poland. Ludwik Kazimierz settled in the Niekłań Wielki estate, which he transformed into a major center of the mining and metallurgical industry.

On May 2, 1859, Plater remarried Julia Bobrinska, who came from a Russian noble family founded by Julia's grandfather, Aleksey Bobrinsky, the natural son of Count Grigory Orlov and Empress Consort Catherine of Russia (later Empress Catherine II). Julia's father was Pavel Bobrinsky, and her mother was Julia Bielińska, daughter of the Polish magnate Stanisław Kostka Bieliński, who was appointed by the Russians as the marshal of the Grodno Sejm that sealed the Second Partition of Poland. Julia was previously married to Count Waldemar Jezierski, who died in 1855, and with whom she had a son, Aleksander. From his second marriage, Cezary Plater had two sons, Cezary and Stanisław, who inherited estates in Greater Poland.
