= Pucołowo =

- Village
- Location within Poland
- Coordinates: 52°7′N 16°55′E
- Country: Poland
- Voivodeship: Greater Poland
- County: Śrem
- Gmina: Śrem
- Population: 30

Pucołowo [put͡sɔˈwɔvɔ] is a village in the administrative district of Gmina Śrem, within Śrem County, Greater Poland Voivodeship, in west-central Poland.
