= Kaleje, Greater Poland Voivodeship =

Kaleje
- Village
- Location within Poland
- Coordinates: 52°10′N 17°5′E
- Country: Poland
- Voivodeship: Greater Poland
- County: Śrem
- Gmina: Śrem
- Highest elevation: 80 m (260 ft)
- Lowest elevation: 70 m (230 ft)
- Population: 200

Kaleje [kaˈlɛjɛ] is a village in the administrative district of Gmina Śrem, within Śrem County, Greater Poland Voivodeship, in west-central Poland.
