= Bodzyniewo =

- Village
- Location within Poland
- Coordinates: 52°2′N 17°0′E
- Country: Poland
- Voivodeship: Greater Poland
- County: Śrem
- Gmina: Śrem
- Elevation: 90 m (300 ft)
- Population: 140

Bodzyniewo [bɔd͡zɨˈɲɛvɔ] is a village in the administrative district of Gmina Śrem, within Śrem County, Greater Poland Voivodeship, in west-central Poland.
