= Coat of arms of Bydgoszcz =

Polish coat of arms

- Cities: Bydgoszcz

The coat of arms of Bydgoszcz is one of the primary city symbols of Bydgoszcz, Poland. It originated shortly after the settlement was granted city rights in 1346; at that time, the emblem bore a strong resemblance to the contemporary coats of arms of Nakło nad Notecią and Śrem.

== History ==
The definitive form of the coat of arms was established in the 15th century, while subsequent centuries served to solidify this image and introduce supplementary elements. From at least the mid-16th century, the central and tallest tower was topped with a cross and a banner, while the flanking towers were finished with spheres or spires.

The cross remained a permanent feature of the city's emblem until 1936. The specific reason for the removal of this heraldic attribute is unknown. Throughout the city's history, the design of the defensive towers also underwent various modifications; though they were most frequently depicted with tented roofs, versions featuring open-topped towers have also appeared in historical records.

The tinctures (colors) employed in the coat of arms deviate from standard heraldic conventions and are distinct from the natural coloring of the structures represented.

== See also ==
- Bydgoszcz
- Polish heraldry
