= Dobczyn, Greater Poland Voivodeship =

Dobczyn
- Village
- Location within Poland
- Coordinates: 52°3′N 17°7′E
- Country: Poland
- Voivodeship: Greater Poland
- County: Śrem
- Gmina: Śrem
- Elevation: 80 m (260 ft)
- Population: 70

Dobczyn [ˈdɔpt͡ʂɨn] is a village in the administrative district of Gmina Śrem, within Śrem County, Greater Poland Voivodeship, in west-central Poland.
