= Tesiny =

- Settlement
- Location within Poland
- Coordinates: 52°8′N 17°4′E
- Country: Poland
- Voivodeship: Greater Poland
- County: Śrem
- Gmina: Śrem
- Elevation: 80 m (260 ft)
- Population: 7

Tesiny [tɛˈɕinɨ] is a settlement in the administrative district of Gmina Śrem, within Śrem County, Greater Poland Voivodeship, in west-central Poland.
