= Szymanowo =

Szymanowo may refer to the following places:

- Szymanowo, Rawicz County in Greater Poland Voivodeship (west-central Poland)
- Szymanowo, Szamotuły County in Greater Poland Voivodeship (west-central Poland)
- Szymanowo, Lublin Voivodeship (east Poland)
- Szymanowo, Śrem County in Greater Poland Voivodeship (west-central Poland)
- Szymanowo, Mrągowo County in Warmian-Masurian Voivodeship (north Poland)
- Szymanowo, Ostróda County in Warmian-Masurian Voivodeship (north Poland)
