= Krzyżanowo =

Krzyżanowo may refer to the following places:

- Krzyżanowo, Greater Poland Voivodeship (west-central Poland)
- Krzyżanowo, Masovian Voivodeship (east-central Poland)
- Krzyżanowo, Pomeranian Voivodeship (north Poland)
