= Grobelka =

- Settlement
- Location within Poland
- Coordinates: 52°9′N 17°4′E
- Country: Poland
- Voivodeship: Greater Poland
- County: Śrem
- Gmina: Śrem
- Elevation: 70 m (230 ft)

Grobelka [ɡrɔˈbɛlka] is a settlement in the administrative district of Gmina Śrem, within Śrem County, Greater Poland Voivodeship, in west-central Poland.
