= Niesłabin =

- Village
- Location within Poland
- Coordinates: 52°8′N 17°0′E
- Country: Poland
- Voivodeship: Greater Poland
- County: Śrem
- Gmina: Śrem
- Highest elevation: 70 m (230 ft)
- Lowest elevation: 60 m (200 ft)
- Population: 350

Niesłabin [ɲɛˈswabin] is a village in the administrative district of Gmina Śrem, within Śrem County, Greater Poland Voivodeship, in west-central Poland.
