= Pełczyn =

Pełczyn may refer to the following places in Poland:

- Pełczyn, Lower Silesian Voivodeship (south-west Poland)
- Pełczyn, Lublin Voivodeship (east Poland)
- Pełczyn, Greater Poland Voivodeship (west-central Poland)
