= Dąbrowa, Śrem County =

Dąbrowa
- Village
- Location within Poland
- Coordinates: 52°7′N 17°7′E
- Country: Poland
- Voivodeship: Greater Poland
- County: Śrem
- Gmina: Śrem
- Elevation: 72 m (236 ft)
- Population: 250

Dąbrowa [dɔmˈbrɔva] is a village in the administrative district of Gmina Śrem, within Śrem County, Greater Poland Voivodeship, in west-central Poland.
