= Dalewo, Greater Poland Voivodeship =

Dalewo
- Village
- Location within Poland
- Coordinates: 52°2′N 16°55′E
- Country: Poland
- Voivodeship: Greater Poland
- County: Śrem
- Gmina: Śrem
- Elevation: 80 m (260 ft)
- Population: 400

Dalewo [daˈlɛvɔ] is a village in the administrative district of Gmina Śrem, within Śrem County, Greater Poland Voivodeship, in west-central Poland.
