= Mechlin, Greater Poland Voivodeship =

Mechlin
- Village
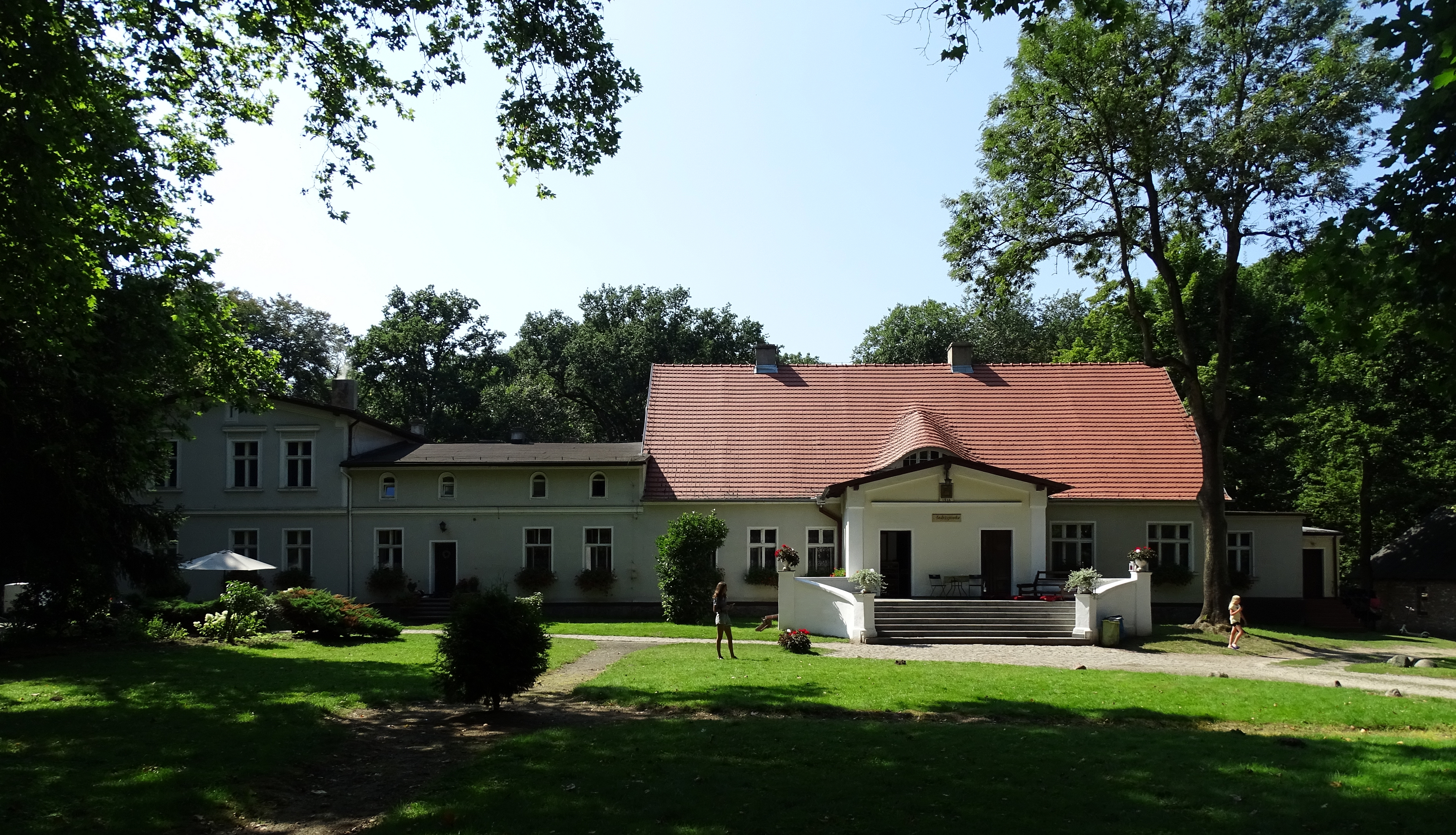
- The manor house from the year 1814.

- Location within Poland
- Coordinates: 52°7′N 17°5′E
- Country: Poland
- Voivodeship: Greater Poland
- County: Śrem
- Gmina: Śrem
- Elevation: 70 m (230 ft)
- Population: 380

Mechlin [ˈmɛxlin] is a village in the administrative district of Gmina Śrem, within Śrem County, Greater Poland Voivodeship, in west-central Poland.
