= Kadzewo =

- Village
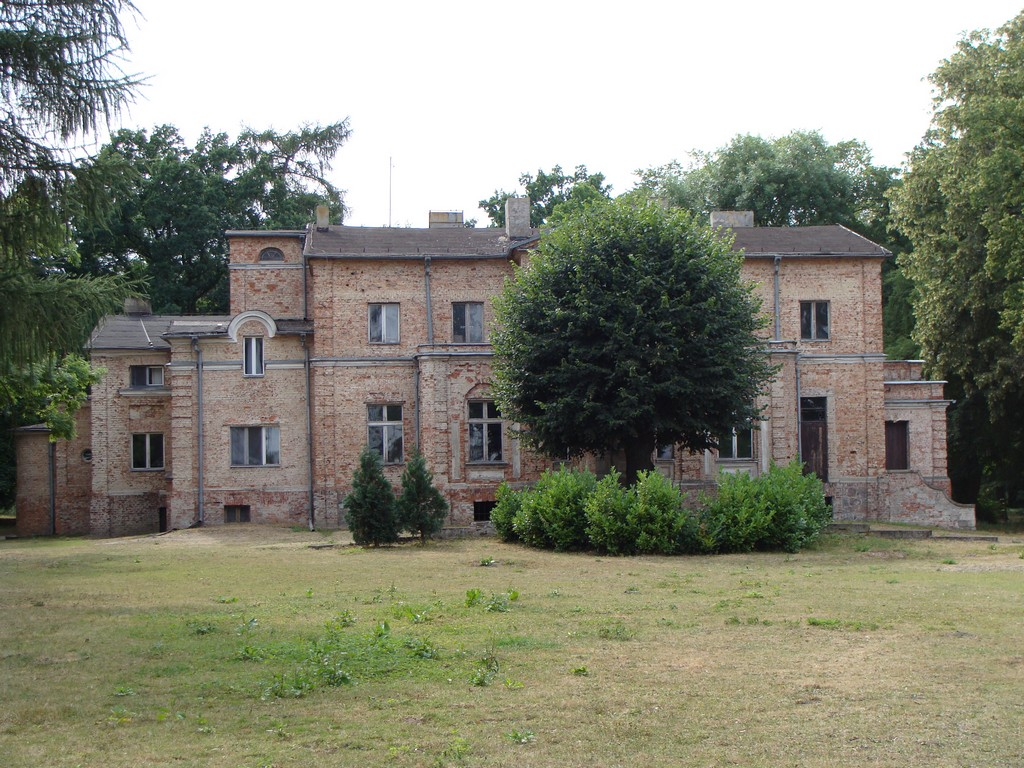
- Manor in the village

- Location within Poland
- Coordinates: 52°2′N 16°59′E
- Country: Poland
- Voivodeship: Greater Poland
- County: Śrem
- Gmina: Śrem
- Elevation: 80 m (260 ft)

Kadzewo [kaˈd͡zɛvɔ] is a village in the administrative district of Gmina Śrem, within Śrem County, Greater Poland Voivodeship, in west-central Poland.

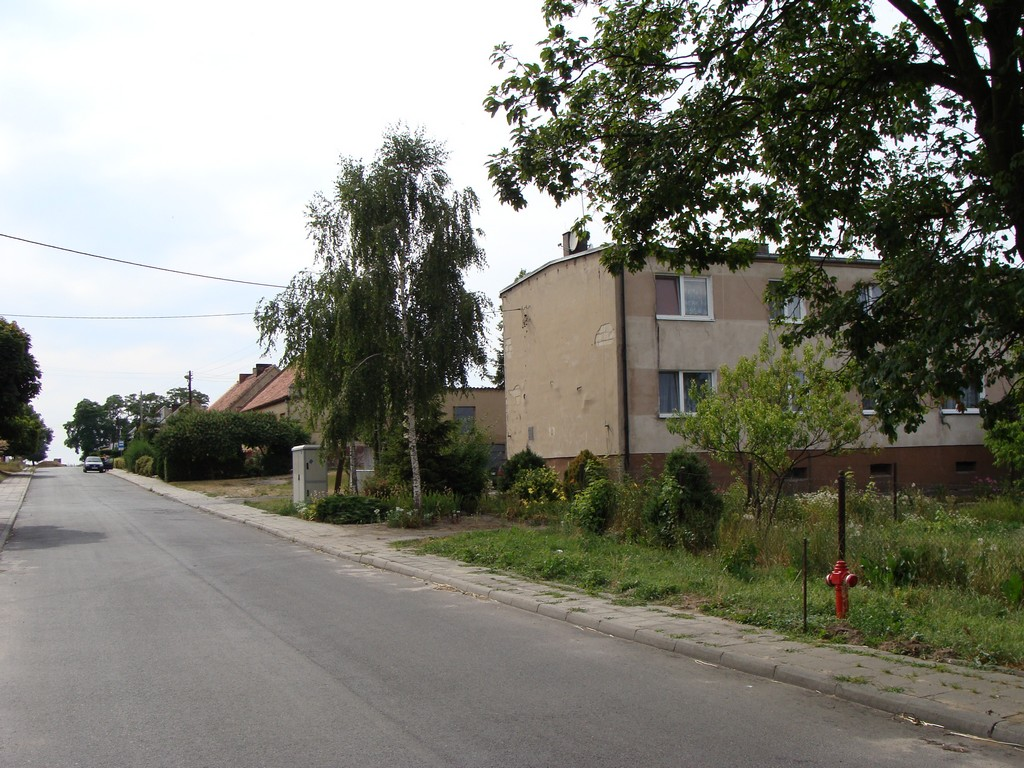
Kadzewo01

== History ==
From 1975 to 1998, the village was part of the territory of the Poznań Voivodeship.
