= Olsza =

Olsza may refer to the following places in Poland:

- Olsza, Cracow, part of the Grzegórzki and Prądnik Czerwony districts of Kraków
- Olsza, Lower Silesian Voivodeship (south-west Poland)
- Olsza, Kuyavian-Pomeranian Voivodeship (north-central Poland)
- Olsza, Podlaskie Voivodeship (north-east Poland)
- Olsza, Łódź Voivodeship (central Poland)
- Olsza, Greater Poland Voivodeship (west-central Poland)

== See also ==
- Olza (disambiguation)
