= Gaj, Śrem County =

Gaj
- Village
- Location within Poland
- Coordinates: 52°5′N 16°56′E
- Country: Poland
- Voivodeship: Greater Poland
- County: Śrem
- Gmina: Śrem
- Highest elevation: 90 m (300 ft)
- Lowest elevation: 80 m (260 ft)
- Population: 250

Gaj [ɡai̯] is a village in the administrative district of Gmina Śrem, within Śrem County, Greater Poland Voivodeship, in west-central Poland.
