= Kotowo, Gmina Śrem =

Kotowo
- Settlement
- Location within Poland
- Coordinates: 52°6′N 17°8′E
- Country: Poland
- Voivodeship: Greater Poland
- County: Śrem
- Gmina: Śrem
- Elevation: 60 m (200 ft)

Kotowo [kɔˈtɔvɔ] is a settlement in the administrative district of Gmina Śrem, within Śrem County, Greater Poland Voivodeship, in west-central Poland.
