= Leon Szuman =

Leon Stanisław Szuman
- Born: 13 November 1852; Kujawki
- Died: 11 November 1920 (aged 67); Grzymysław
- Occupations: surgeon, poet

Leon Szuman (born 13 November 1852 in Kujawki; died 11 November 1920 in Grzymysław) was a Polish surgeon, poet, and social activist.

== Biography ==
Leon Szuman was born on 13 November 1852 in Kujawki. His father was Idzi Szuman, a participant of the January Uprising, who was imprisoned in Konin Fortress for making bullets for the insurgents. Leon's mother died of tuberculosis a few years after his birth. After his mother's death, he was raised in the home of his maternal uncle in Poznań. He initially studied at home. At the age of nine, he began his education at the Gymnasium of St. Mary Magdalene in Poznań (nowadays St. Mary Magdalene High School). He graduated in 1871. From 1871 to 1876, he studied medicine in Wrocław. In 1872, he began independent scientific research. He experimented on animals, partly in physiological institutes and partly in natural conditions in the countryside. The result of his research was a dissertation titled "Experiments on the Temporary and Permanent Closure of Vessels after Ligature and Acupressure," (Polish: Doświadczenia nad czasowym i trwałym zamknięciem światła naczyń po podwiązaniu i akupresurze) which was awarded by the Medical Faculty of the University of Wrocław. The work was published in 1847 in the Annals of the Warsaw Medical Society. During his studies, he had a break due to health problems. He obtained his medical degree in 1876 based on his scientific work on malignant bone growths. After two years of assistantship, he passed the state examination in 1877, qualifying him to practice as a physician. From 1877 to 1879, he worked as an emergency physician. He was an assistant to Professor Hermann Fischer. Due to low wages and conflict with Fischer, in June 1879, Szuman settled in Toruń. He began his medical practice at the private hospital of the deaconess sisters. As the first doctor in Toruń, he performed surgeries on the appendix, gallbladder, hernia, intestines, and stomach.

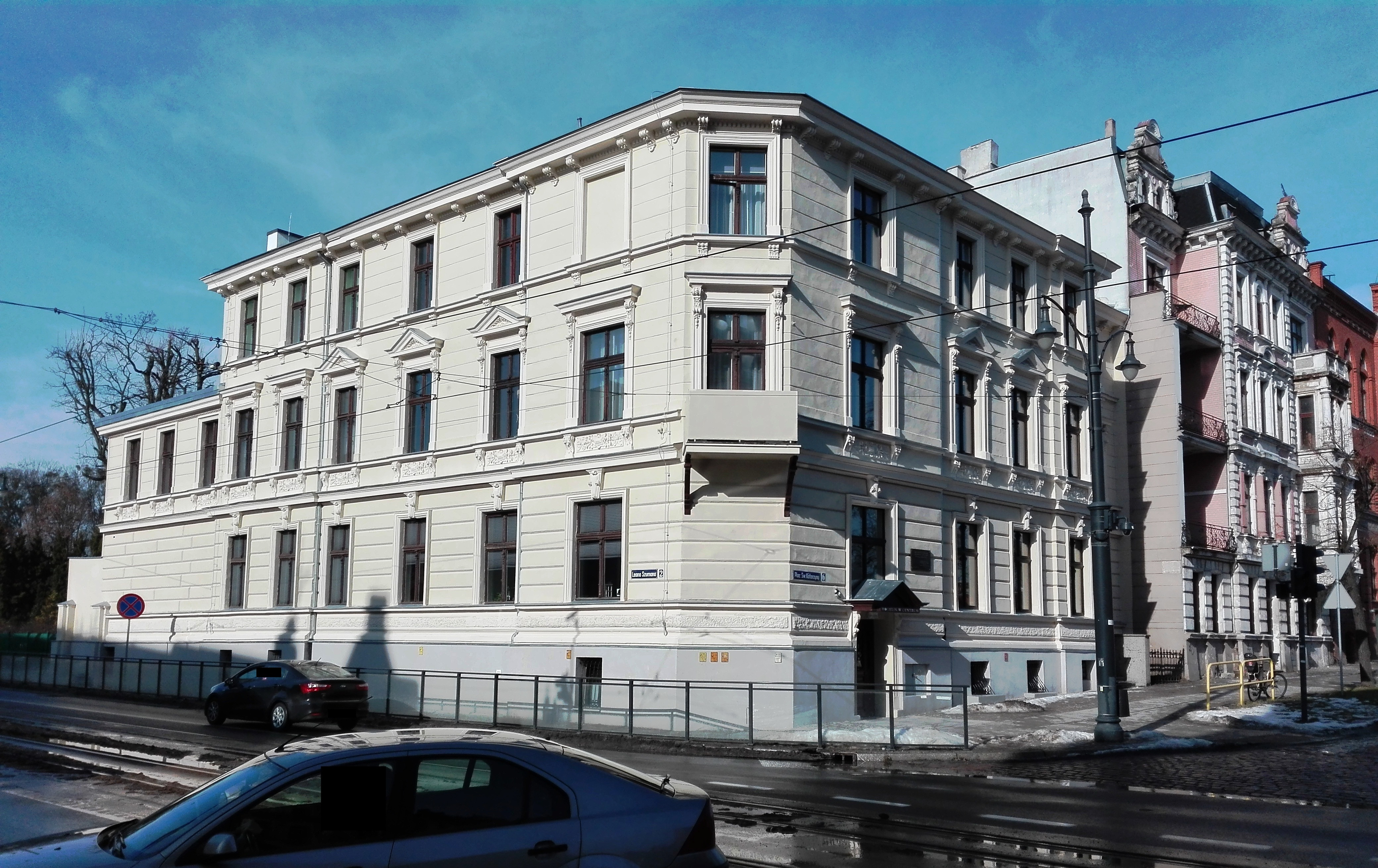
The building that housed Leon Szuman's clinic

In 1884, he established a small private clinic on Mikołaj Kopernik Street. On 7 March 1893 he founded a new clinic located on the then Werderstrasse. The new clinic was equipped with modern equipment and surgical instruments, allowing for procedures that could not be performed at the City Hospital or other private clinics. Thanks to numerous successes, his clinic gained a reputation, and Szuman himself was called the "Pomeranian Mikulicz". He wrote over 50 scientific publications published in Polish and German journals. Most of the texts were published in the Poznań Medical News (Polish: Nowiny Lekarskie). In 1914, he became a member of the Association of Polish Physicians and Naturalists in St. Petersburg. He was also a member of the German Medical Chamber.

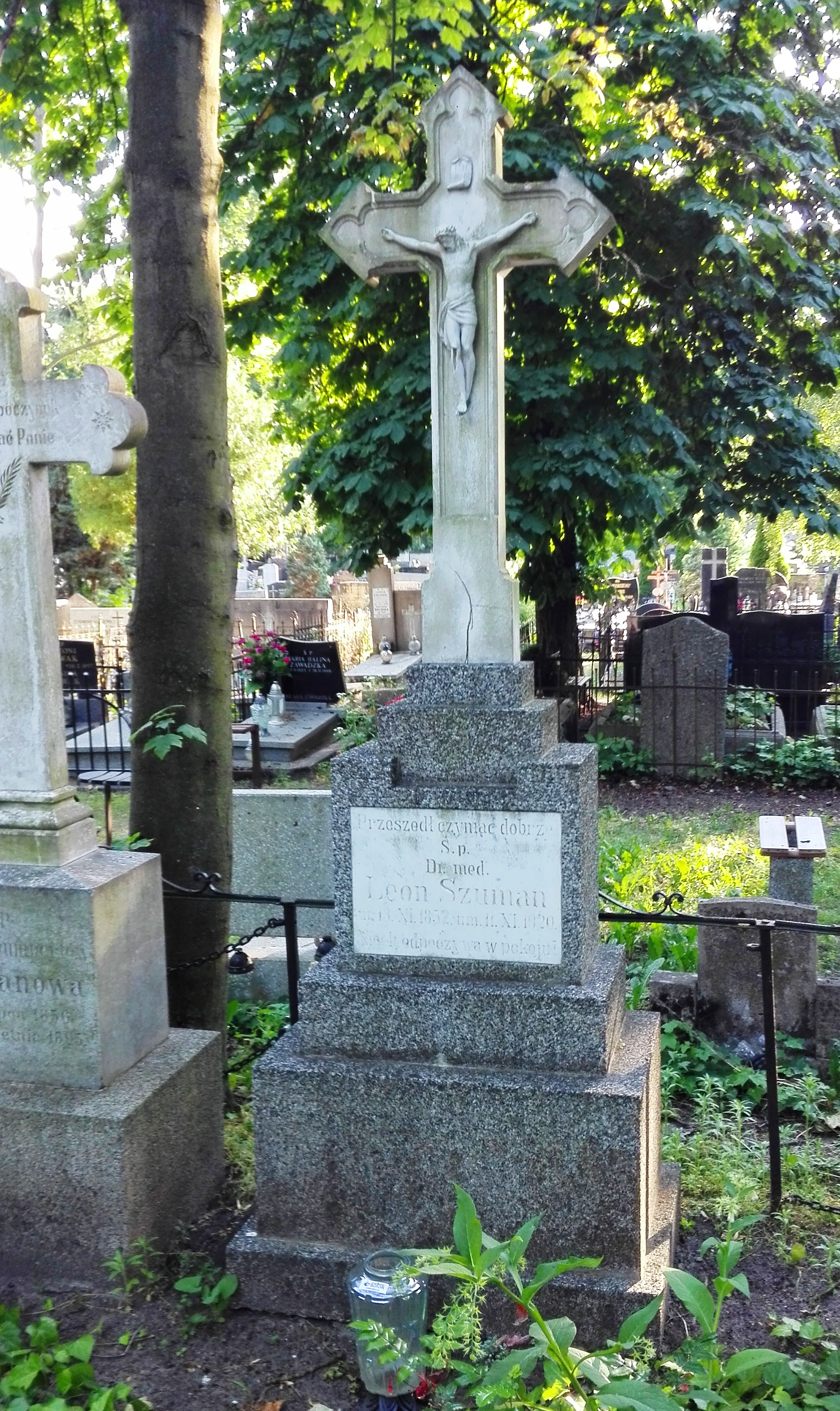
The grave of Leon Szuman in St George's cemetery in Toruń

In 1918, Szuman handed over the clinic to his closest collaborator, Dr. Zdzisław Dandelski. On 24 November 1918 he signed a petition for assistance to repatriates. Leon Szuman died on 11 November 1920 in Grzymysław near Śrem. He was buried in St. George's Cemetery in Toruń. Leon Szuman's medical library was transferred to the University Library in Poznań.

== Poetic work ==
Szuman published several volumes of poetry. Most of the poems had a patriotic and national character. Many poems were dedicated to hunting, which was his passion. Four volumes of his poetry have been preserved in the collections of the Provincial Public Library – Copernicus Library:

- Hare Ballad (Toruń, 1886);
- Hunting Memories (Toruń, 1890);
- From Hunts and Journeys (Toruń, 1894);
- Memories and Songs from the Years 1915-1919. From the times of bloodshed and devastation on the earth (Toruń, 1919).

== Social activity ==
Szuman actively participated in the social and patriotic life of Toruń. He belonged to the Scientific Society in Toruń (TNT). In May 1881, he co-founded the joint-stock company "Museum in Toruń," aimed at raising funds for the construction of the TNT headquarters, which was also to be a hotel and a museum of Polish history. Szuman was a member of the Supervisory Board, and from 1886, the president of TNT. In 1918, he initiated and co-founded the Toruń Museum Society, aimed at supporting the activities of TNT. After its establishment, Szuman became the president of the Society.

== Personal life ==
In 1879, he married Eugenia Gumpertówna. From his first marriage, he had seven children: Maria (married Plecińska), Henryk (Servant of God), Irena (married Kozłowska), Stefan (professor at the University of Poznań), Wanda (social activist), Leon, and Jerzy. After Eugenia Gumpert's death in 1895 from tuberculosis, he married Emilia Gumpertówna, the older sister of his first wife, widow of Bolesław Osiecki. He had no children from his second marriage. According to Wanda Szuman, her father married Emilia at the explicit request of the dying Eugenia. Emilia Gumpertówna died on October 20, 1912.
