= Sosnowice =

Sosnowice may refer to the following places:

- Sosnowice, Lesser Poland Voivodeship (south Poland)
- Sosnowice, Masovian Voivodeship (east-central Poland)
- Sosnowice, Goleniów County in West Pomeranian Voivodeship (north-west Poland)
- Sosnowice, Kamień County in West Pomeranian Voivodeship (north-west Poland)

== See also ==
- Sosnowiec (disambiguation)
