= Wanda Szuman =

Polish educator (1890–1994)

- Born: 3 April 1890; Toruń, Prussia, German Empire
- Died: 1 December 1994 (aged 104); Toruń, Poland
- Occupation: Educator
- Father: Leon Szuman
- Relatives: Henryk Antoni Szuman (brother); Jerzy Szuman (brother); Stefan Szuman (brother)

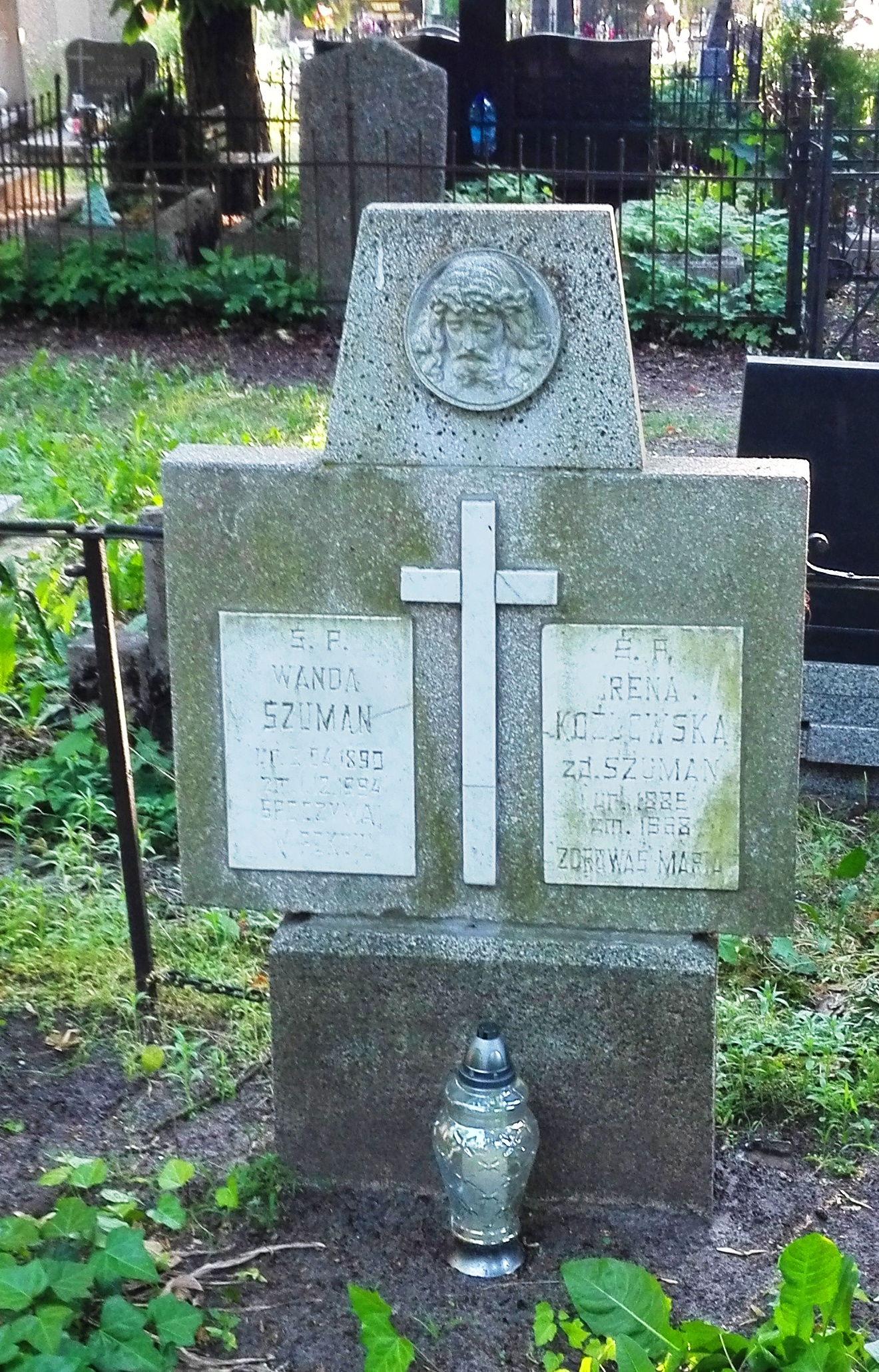
Szuman's grave

Wanda Szuman or Szumanówna (3 April 1890 – 1 December 1994) was a Polish educator. She was a "pioneer of special education in Poland" and worked particularly with orphans and children with special needs. She also participated in the underground education movement during World War II, teaching subjects that were forbidden by law at the time. She won multiple awards for her teaching during her lifetime.

== Biography ==
Szuman was born on 3 April 1890 in Toruń, Poland (then Prussia), and died on 1 December 1994, at the age of 104. Her mother was Eugenia Gumpert, a social activist, her father was surgeon Leon Szuman, and she was one of seven children; among her brothers Stefan Szuman became a professor of psychology, Jerzy Szuman became a professor of agriculture, and Henryk Antoni Szuman was a priest who perished during the World War II. Her mother died in 1895 and her father married her aunt, Emilia Osiecka (née Gumpert).

Szuman attended the Sacred Heart Sisters' Gymnasium in Lviv. In 1911, she went to Kraków and graduated from a private teacher training school for women. Around that time, she was already engaged in carrying out educational activities herself, including underground education in the Polish language (at that time illegal in Prussia). In 1914, she co-founded Wełnianka, an education club for young women.

After Poland regained independence in the aftermath of World War I, Szuman became a Polish national. She also became involved in various educational activities in the new Poland, initially in the Toruń region. She was involved with a number of educational NGOs of that time. Later, she moved to Warsaw where she continued her studies from 1921 to 1923 and carried out academic research. In 1931 in Warsaw, Szuman initiated a special committee arranging for the placement of children in foster care. Children up to the age of two were placed in the homes of families that had few or no children. From 1933, she worked in Poznań where she was superintendent of a seminary.

She was active in underground education during World War II while living in Radom. After the war, she returned to Toruń where she organized and directed a high school. Due to her strong support for Catholicism, she was repressed by the communist authorities and lost her job in 1949; she would be rehabilitated in 1958. From 1949 to 1952, she worked as a school psychologist and therapist for children with special needs. She retired in 1952, but continued to be involved in a number of scholarly studies in the field of pedagogy and continued to work with organizations supporting special education, in particular related to helping blind children. Her published works included Wychowanie niewidomego dziecka (Raising a Blind Child; 1961).

== Recognition ==
She is "considered a pioneer of special education in Poland".

Szuman was awarded the Order of Polonia Restituta in 1923, described as "referentka kuratorjum szkolnego pomorskie" (clerk to the Pomeranian school board), and in 1992 was given honorary citizenship of the city of Toruń. She also received Honorary Gold Badge of the Polish Association of the Blind (1966), Medal of the Polish Society for Combating Disability (1984), Badge of the Polish Teachers' Union "For Secret Teaching" (1985), and the Order of the Smile (1986).

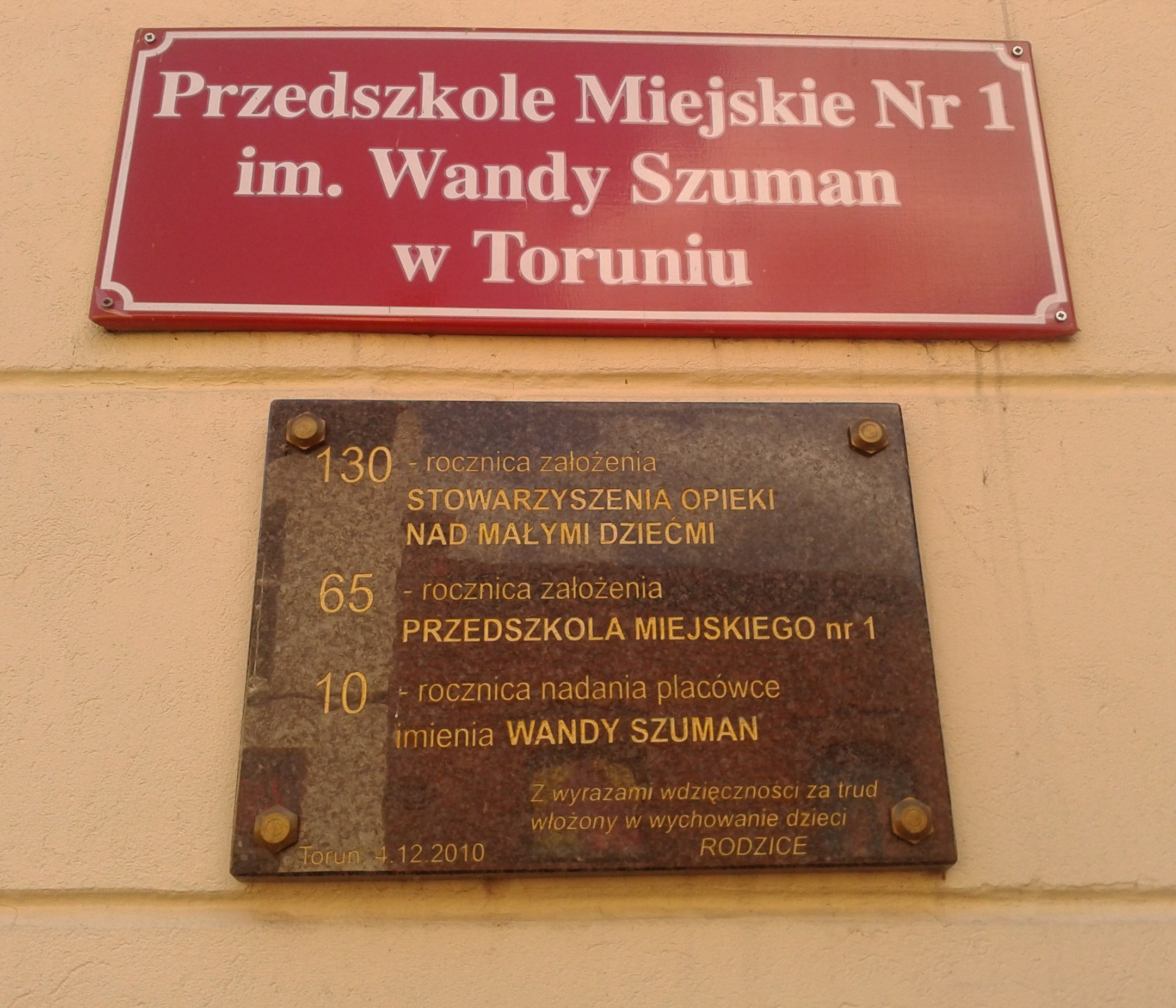
Plaque on a nursery school named in Szuman's honour

Two schools in Toruń are named in her honour: a high school (VII Liceum Ogólnokształcące im. Wandy Szuman), and elementary school (Szkoła Podstawowa Nr 16 im. Wandy Szuman w Toruniu), as is a nursery school.

A book about her, Wanda Szuman—pedagog i andragog specjalny: szkice do portretu (Wanda Szuman—Child and Adult Special Educator: Sketches for a Portrait), was published in 2009 by Beata Borowska-Beszta (ISBN 978-83-7204-785-4).

== Selected publications ==
- Komisja Edukacyjna pierwszem ministerstwem oświaty w Europie [The Education Commission as the first ministry of education in Europe], 1919
- Zum Problem der Waisenerziehung [On the problem of raising orphans], 1929
- Rola opiekunów społecznych [The role of social workers], 1930
- Testy inteligencji Ch. Bühler dla niemowląt [Intelligence tests Ch. Buhler for babies], 1930
- System umieszczania sierot w rodzinach [The system of placing orphans in families], 1931
- Wychowanie niewidomego dziecka [Raising a Blind Child], 1961
- O dostępności rysunku dla dzieci niewidomych [About the accessibility of drawing for blind children], 1967
