= Julius Schreiber =

German internist (1848–1932)

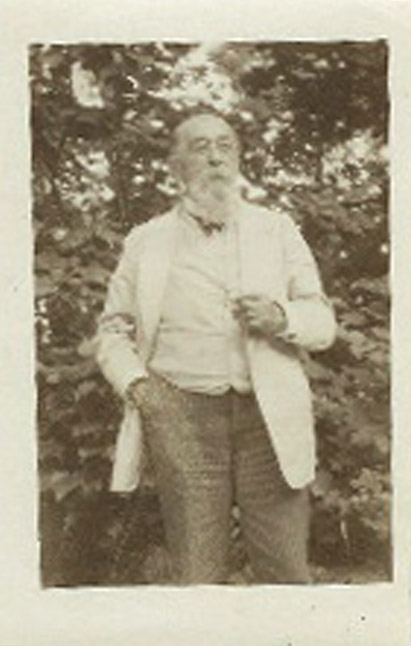
Julius Schreiber

Julius Schreiber (28 February 1848 in Schrimm – 18 September 1932 in Königsberg) was a German internist.

In 1875, he received his medical doctorate from the University of Königsberg, obtaining his habilitation for internal medicine two years later as a student of Bernhard Naunyn. In 1878 he worked as assistant under Carl Ludwig and Julius Cohnheim at the University of Leipzig. In 1883 he became an associate professor at Königsberg, where in 1886 he was named director of the medical polyclinic. In 1921 he became a full professor at the University of Königsberg.

He was known for his construction of endoscopic instruments that included an early esophagoscope. Among his numerous written efforts were a treatise on the swallowing mechanism, titled "Ueber den Schluckmechanismus" and a work on brain pressure that he co-authored with Dr. Naunyn, "Über Gehirndruck" (1881).
