= Gmina Śrem =

Gmina Śrem Śrem Commune
- Gmina
- Flag Coat of arms
- Interactive map of Gmina Śrem
- Coordinates (Śrem): 52°5′N 17°1′E
- Country: Poland
- Voivodeship: Greater Poland
- County: Śrem
- Seat: Śrem

Area
  - Total: 205.83 km^{2} (79.47 sq mi)

Population (2006)
  - Total: 39,841
  - Density: 193.56/km^{2} (501.32/sq mi)
  - Urban: 30,227
  - Rural: 9,614
- Website: http://www.srem.pl

Gmina Śrem is an urban-rural gmina (administrative district) in Śrem County, Greater Poland Voivodeship, in west-central Poland. Its seat is the town of Śrem, which lies approximately 36 kilometres (22 mi) south of the regional capital Poznań.

The gmina covers an area of 205.83 square kilometres (79.5 sq mi), and as of 2006 its total population is 39,841 (out of which the population of Śrem amounts to 30,227, and the population of the rural part of the gmina is 9,614).

The gmina contains part of the protected area called Chłapowski Landscape Park.

== Villages ==
Apart from the town of Śrem, Gmina Śrem contains the villages and settlements of Barbarki, Binkowo, Błociszewo, Bodzyniewo, Borgowo, Bystrzek, Dąbrowa, Dalewo, Dobczyn, Gaj, Góra, Grobelka, Grodzewo, Grzymysław, Jeleńczewo, Kadzewo, Kaleje, Kawcze, Kotowo, Krzyżanowo, Łęg, Luciny, Marianowo, Marszewo, Mateuszewo, Mechlin, Mórka, Niesłabin, Nochówko, Nochowo, Olsza, Orkowo, Ostrowo, Pełczyn, Psarskie, Pucołowo, Pysząca, Sosnowiec, Szymanowo, Tesiny, Wirginowo, Wyrzeka and Zbrudzewo.

== Neighbouring gminas ==
Gmina Śrem is bordered by the gminas of Brodnica, Czempiń, Dolsk, Kórnik, Krzywiń, Książ Wielkopolski and Zaniemyśl.
