= Zbrudzewo =

- Village
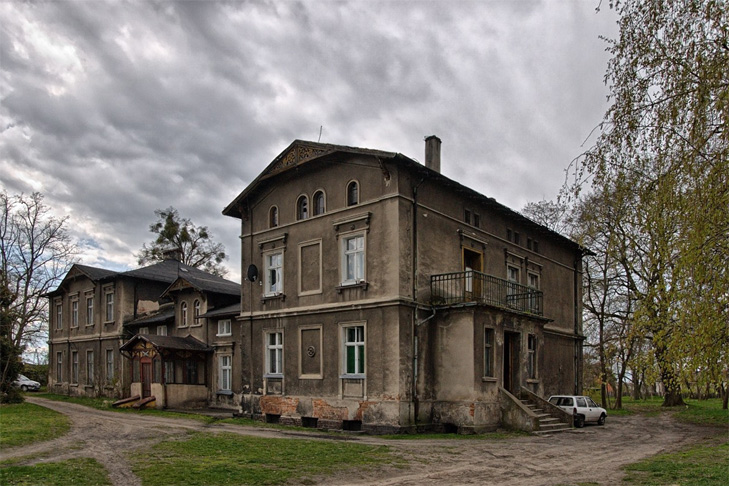
- Skrzydlewski Manor in Zbrudzewo

- Location within Poland
- Coordinates: 52°7′N 17°2′E
- Country: Poland
- Voivodeship: Greater Poland
- County: Śrem
- Gmina: Śrem
- Elevation: 80 m (260 ft)
- Population: 560
- Time zone: UTC+1 (CET)
  - Summer (DST): UTC+2 (CEST)
- Vehicle registration: PSE

Zbrudzewo [zbruˈd͡zɛvɔ] is a village in the administrative district of Gmina Śrem, within Śrem County, Greater Poland Voivodeship, in west-central Poland.

== History ==
The village dates back to the Middle Ages, and it surely existed before 1388. In the past it was a possession of the nearby town of Śrem, and was administratively located in the Pyzdry County in the Kalisz Voivodeship in the Greater Poland Province of the Polish Crown. The Zbrudzewski noble family hailed from the village.

During the German occupation of Poland (World War II), on November 8, 1939, the Germans murdered 12 Poles from Śrem at the local shooting range (see Nazi crimes against the Polish nation). There is a memorial at the site.

== Notable people ==
- Jerzy Skrzydlewski (1896–1940), Polish lieutenant colonel, victim of the Katyn massacre
