= Krzyżanowo, Greater Poland Voivodeship =

Krzyżanowo
- Village
- Location within Poland
- Coordinates: 52°6′N 16°55′E
- Country: Poland
- Voivodeship: Greater Poland
- County: Śrem
- Gmina: Śrem
- Elevation: 70 m (230 ft)
- Population: 400

Krzyżanowo [kʂɨʐaˈnɔvɔ] is a village in the administrative district of Gmina Śrem, within Śrem County, Greater Poland Voivodeship, in west-central Poland.
