= Olza =

Olza may refer to:

- Olza (river), a river in the Czech Republic and Poland
- Olza, Silesian Voivodeship, a village in Poland
- Cendea de Olza/Oltza Zendea, a municipality in Spain
- SS Olza, a Polish ship

== See also ==
- Olsza (disambiguation)
