= Szymanowo, Śrem County =

Szymanowo
- Village
- Location within Poland
- Coordinates: 52°6′N 16°58′E
- Country: Poland
- Voivodeship: Greater Poland
- County: Śrem
- Gmina: Śrem
- Elevation: 80 m (260 ft)
- Population: 180

Szymanowo (Polish: [ʂɨmaˈnɔvɔ]) is a village in the administrative district of Gmina Śrem, within Śrem County, Greater Poland Voivodeship, in west-central Poland.
