= Śrem =

Town on the Warta river in central Poland

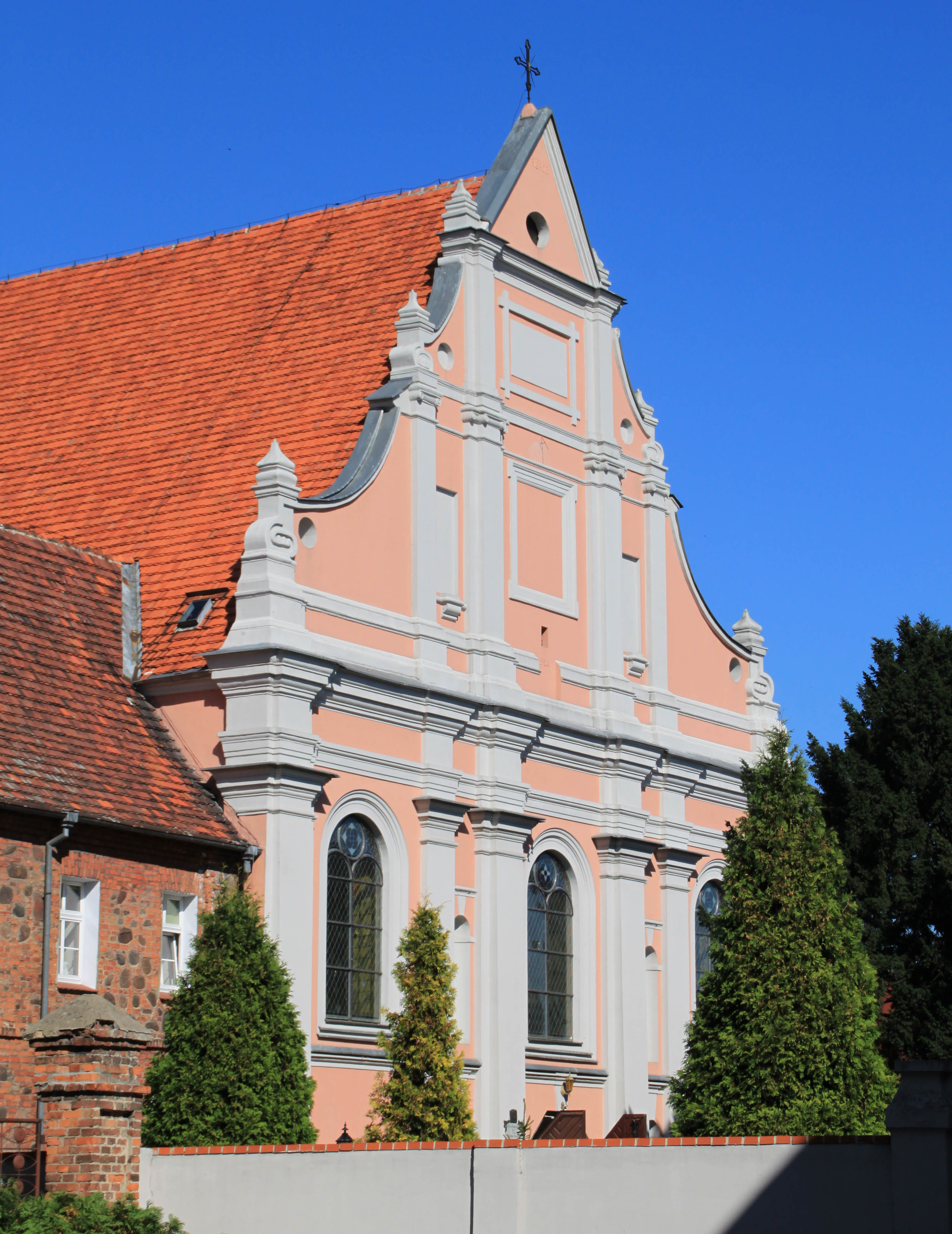
- Old Franciscan baroque church

- Flag Coat of arms

- Location within Poland
- Coordinates: 52°05′19″N 17°00′53″E
- Country: Poland
- Voivodeship: Greater Poland
- County: Śrem
- Gmina: Śrem
- Established: 10th/11th century
- Town rights: 1253

Government
  - Mayor: Grzegorz Wiśniewski

Area
  - Total: 12.37 km^{2} (4.78 sq mi)
- Elevation: 80 m (260 ft)

Population (2025)
  - Total: 27,488
  - Density: 2,222/km^{2} (5,755/sq mi)
- Time zone: UTC+1 (CET)
  - Summer (DST): UTC+2 (CEST)
- Postal code: 63-100
- Area code: +48 61
- Car plates: PSE
- Climate: Cfb
- Website: www.srem.pl

Śrem [ɕrɛm] is a town on the Warta river in west-central Poland. It is the seat of Śrem County in the Greater Poland Voivodeship.

== Geography ==
Śrem is 45 kilometres (28 miles) to the south of Poznań. The Śrem County has a population of 60,939, of which about 27,488 live in the town of Śrem.

== History ==
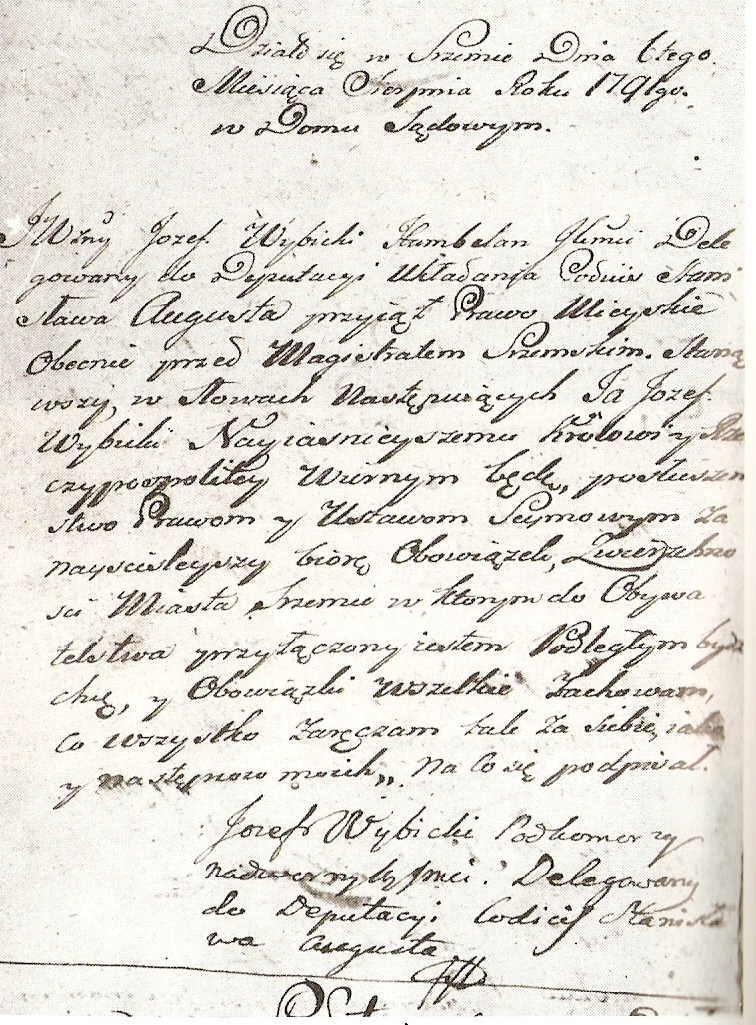
Declaration signed by Józef Wybicki, author of the Polish national anthem lyrics, of becoming a burgher of Śrem in 1791

Śrem was founded in the second half of the 10th century in the cradle of the emerging Polish state, when a fortified settlement, which protected the ford across the Warta on an important trade route from Silesia to Poznań, was erected on the right bank of the Warta river, and soon a trade settlement developed on the left bank. It is numbered among the oldest Lechitic settlements. Śrem received municipal rights from dukes Bolesław the Pious and Przemysł I of Greater Poland in 1253, the same year as Poznań.

Śrem developed rapidly and in the 14th century, it became a royal town of the Polish Crown and the seat of local royal officials (starosta). Administratively it was located in the Poznań Voivodeship in the Greater Poland Province. Its heyday was in the first half of the 15th century and the second half of the 16th century. Later, lengthy wars, epidemics and natural catastrophes caused Śrem to decline, like many other towns in the Greater Poland region. In the late 18th century, Józef Wybicki, Polish jurist, poet, political and military activist, best known as the author of the lyrics of the Polish national anthem, settled in nearby Manieczki, and in 1791 became a burgher and honorary citizen of Śrem.

The town was annexed by Prussia in the Second Partition of Poland in 1793. During the period of the Partitions of Poland, Śrem was known by its German name, Schrimm. After the successful Greater Poland uprising of 1806, it was regained by Poles and included within the short-lived Duchy of Warsaw. After the duchy's dissolution, it was re-annexed by Prussia in 1815, and from 1871 it was part of Germany. Despite the influx of German officials, Śrem remained a typical Polish town. During the Greater Poland uprising (1848), a hospital for Polish insurgents was established in the town, and in the following decades the town remained a center of Polish resistance, and Poles established various organizations and enterprises. After World War I Poland regained independence in November 1918, and the Greater Poland uprising (1918–19) broke out, during which in December 1918, the local German garrison surrendered without resistance and the town was finally restored to the Second Polish Republic. In the interbellum new factories were opened and new housing districts were built.

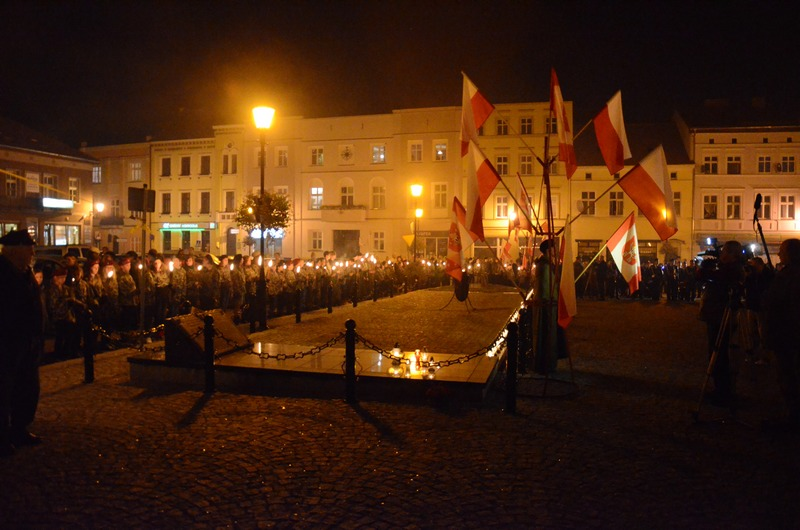
Public ceremony commemorating the 73rd anniversary of a German public execution of Poles during World War II

Śrem was bombed by Germany on 1 September 1939, the first day of the invasion of Poland, which began World War II. During the German occupation, the Polish population was subjected to mass arrests, imprisonment, executions, expulsions, and deportations to Nazi concentration camps. In September 1939, the Einsatzgruppe VI carried out mass arrests of Poles, many of whom were immediately murdered. The Einsatzgruppe VI carried out public executions of Poles from Śrem and nearby villages on 20 September and 20 October 1939, killing 20 and 19 people respectively, including former Polish insurgents of 1918–1919, local administration and court officials, merchants, and landowners. The Polish resistance movement was quickly organized in the town, incl. the Dla Ciebie Polsko ("For You, Poland") organization founded by a local teacher in October 1939, and later also the Home Army. 12 Poles arrested in Śrem were executed in the nearby village of Zbrudzewo on 8 November 1939. Further mass arrests of 45 Poles, mostly teachers, were carried out in May 1940, and most were then deported to the Mauthausen and Dachau concentration camps, and murdered there. In 1939 and 1940, the Germans expelled hundreds of Poles, who were deported to the General Government in the more-eastern part of German-occupied Poland, and their houses were then handed over to German colonists as part of the Lebensraum policy. After the end of German occupation, the town was restored to Poland, although with a Soviet-installed communist regime, which stayed in power until the Fall of Communism in the 1980s.

From 1975 to 1998 it was administratively part of the Poznań Voivodeship. In August 1980, employees of local factories joined the nationwide anti-communist strikes, which led to the foundation of the Solidarity organization, which played a central role in the end of communist rule in Poland.

== Economy ==
At present, the town has a population of about 30,000, with a fast-developing economy. It is the seat of many firms with private and foreign capital, which have invested in metallurgy, furniture production, transport, window and door production, textiles and food processing. The Śrem Iron Foundry is the biggest plant in Śrem and Śrem County. Business activity in the area is supported by such institutions as the Craftsmen's Guild, the Śrem Centre for Support of Small Business, and the County Branch of the Wielkopolska Chamber of Industry and Commerce.

== Transport ==
Śrem is a major road junction where voivodeship roads 434, 432 and 310 converge and in some places bypass the town.

The nearest railway station is in Czempiń.

== Attractions ==
For attractions, promoters cite the scenery, palaces and manors with surrounding parks, domestic and religious architecture, as well as nature sanctuaries. Infrastructure includes accommodation, restaurants, and sports and leisure facilities (see below).

Śrem is also the seat of education facilities: vocational and secondary schools as well as a branch of Adam Mickiewicz University of Poznań. The branch offers Bachelor of Science courses in material chemistry and tourism. In addition, there are cultural institutions such as the Śrem Museum, the public library, the Culture Centre, and local media including the press, television.

There are also monuments to notable people connected with Śrem, including Józef Wybicki and Piotr Wawrzyniak, and memorials to the Greater Poland uprising (1918–19) participants and the victims of World War II.

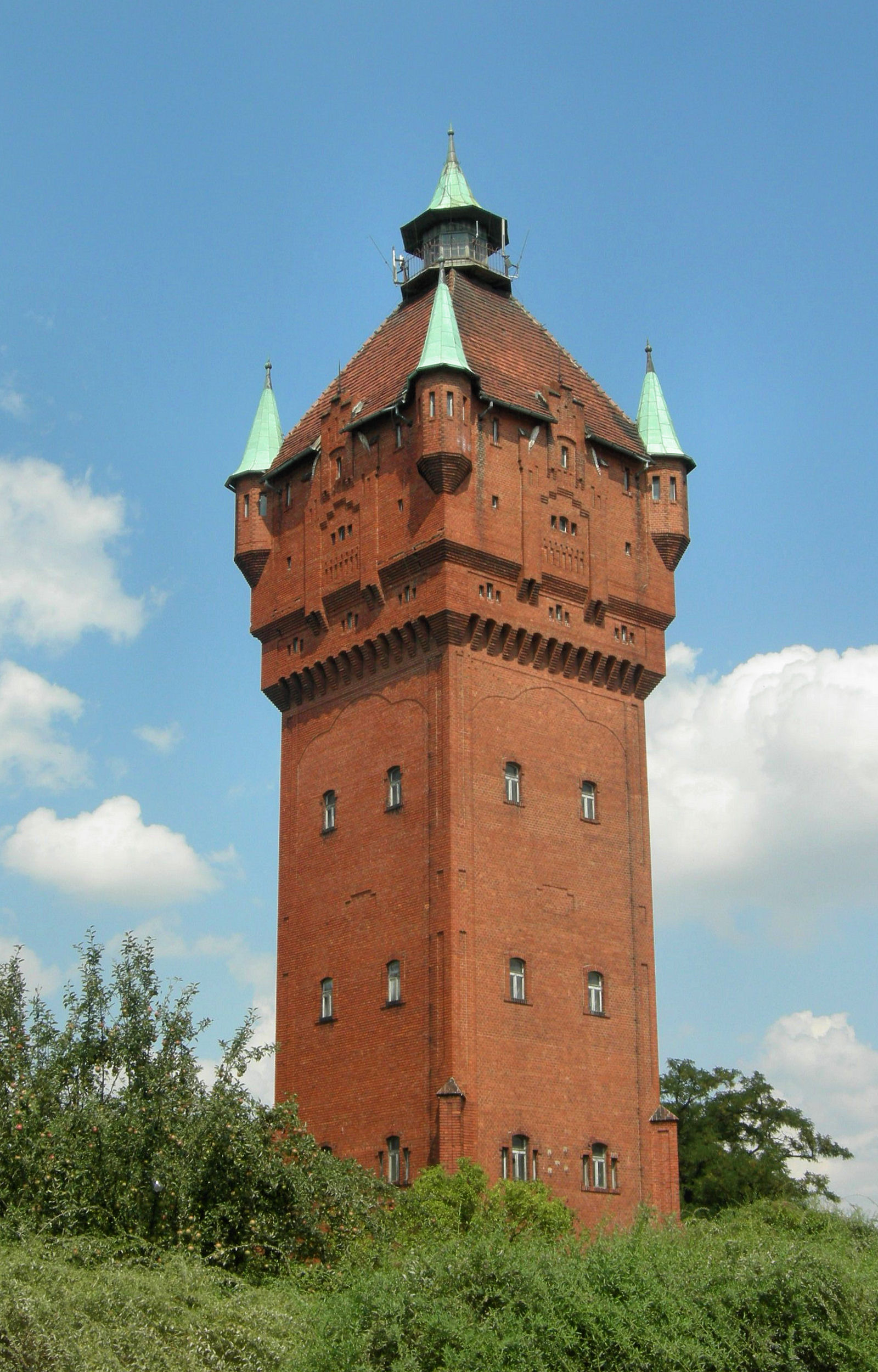
Water tower

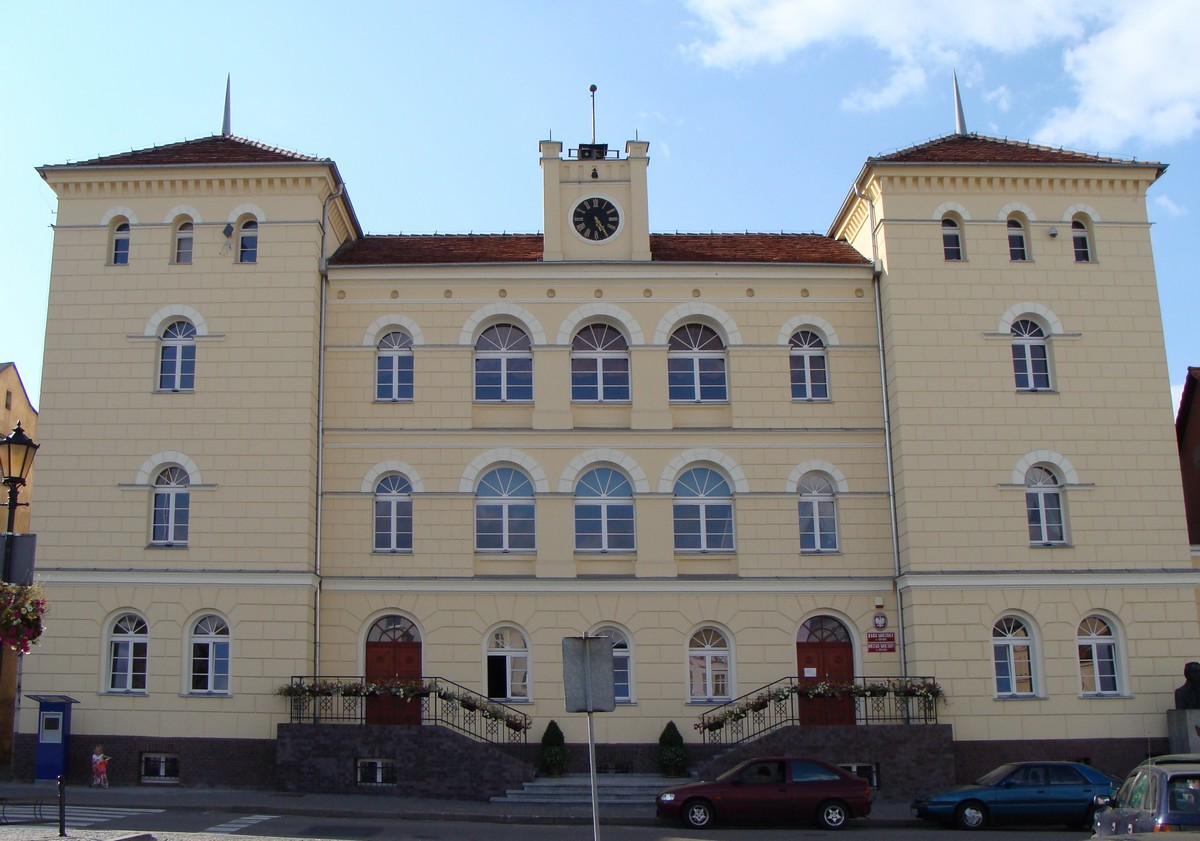
Town hall

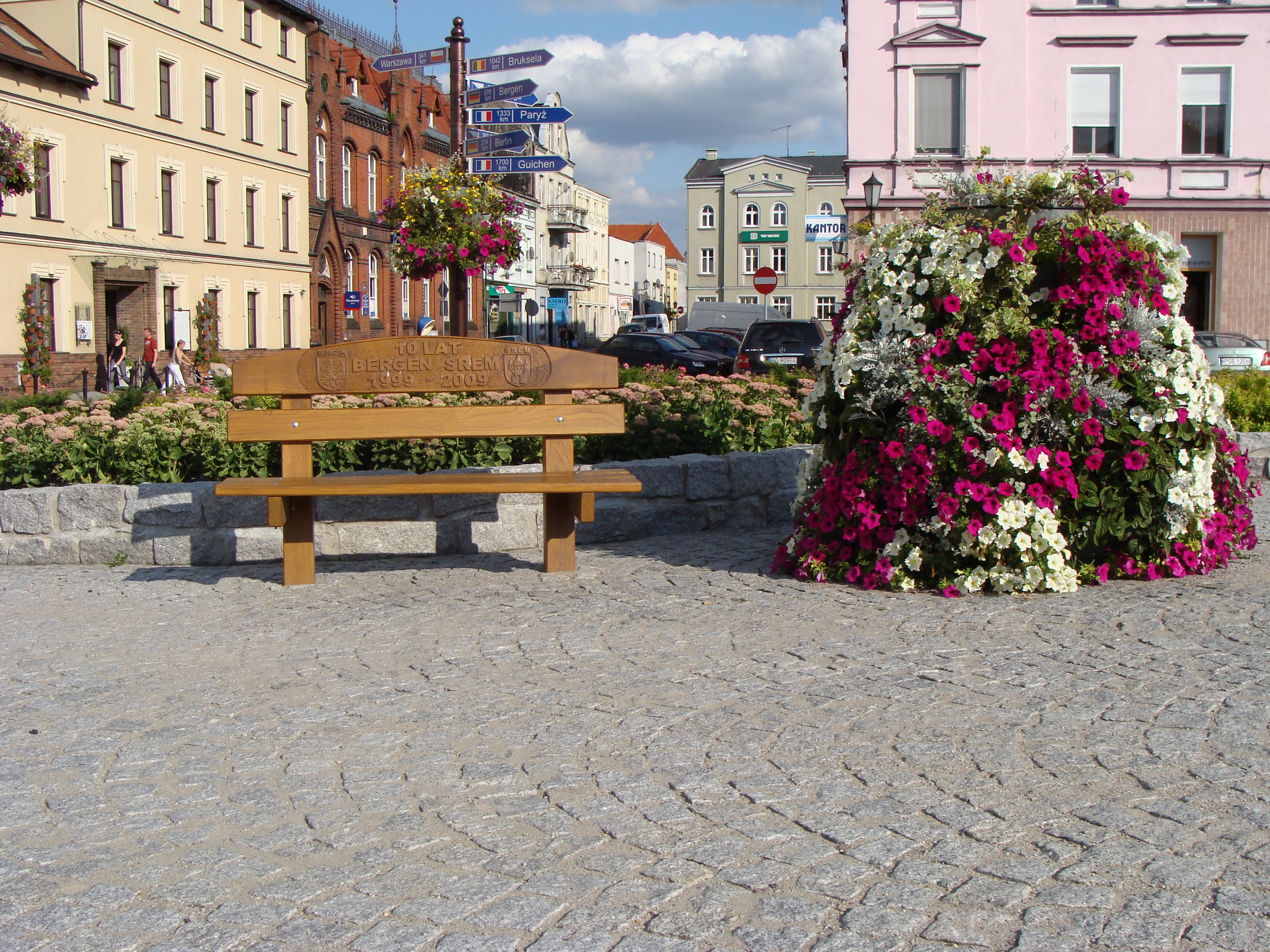
Market Square

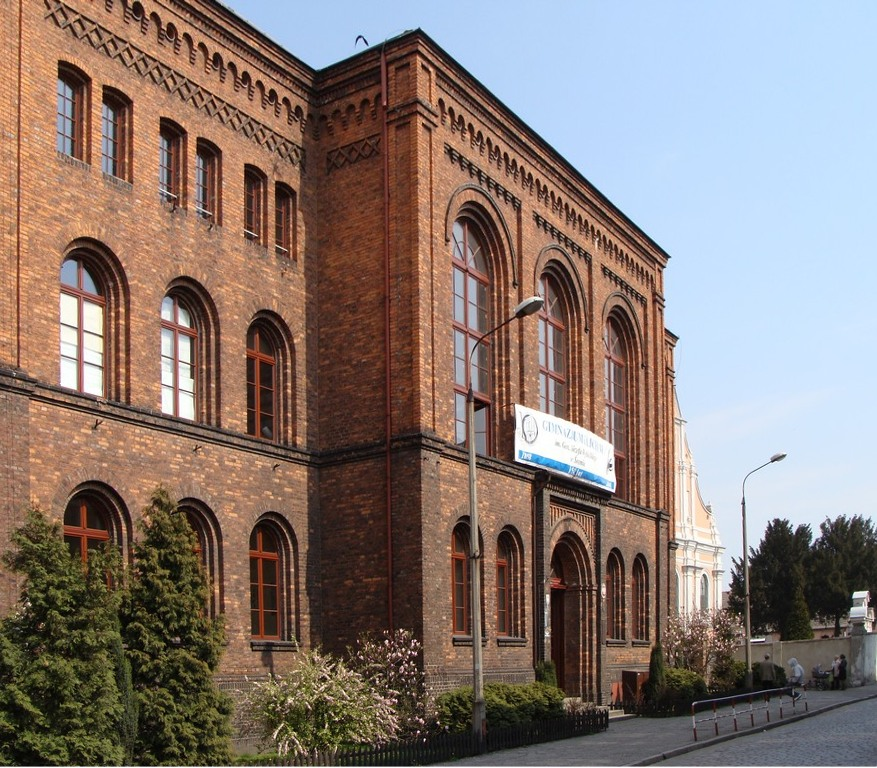
High School

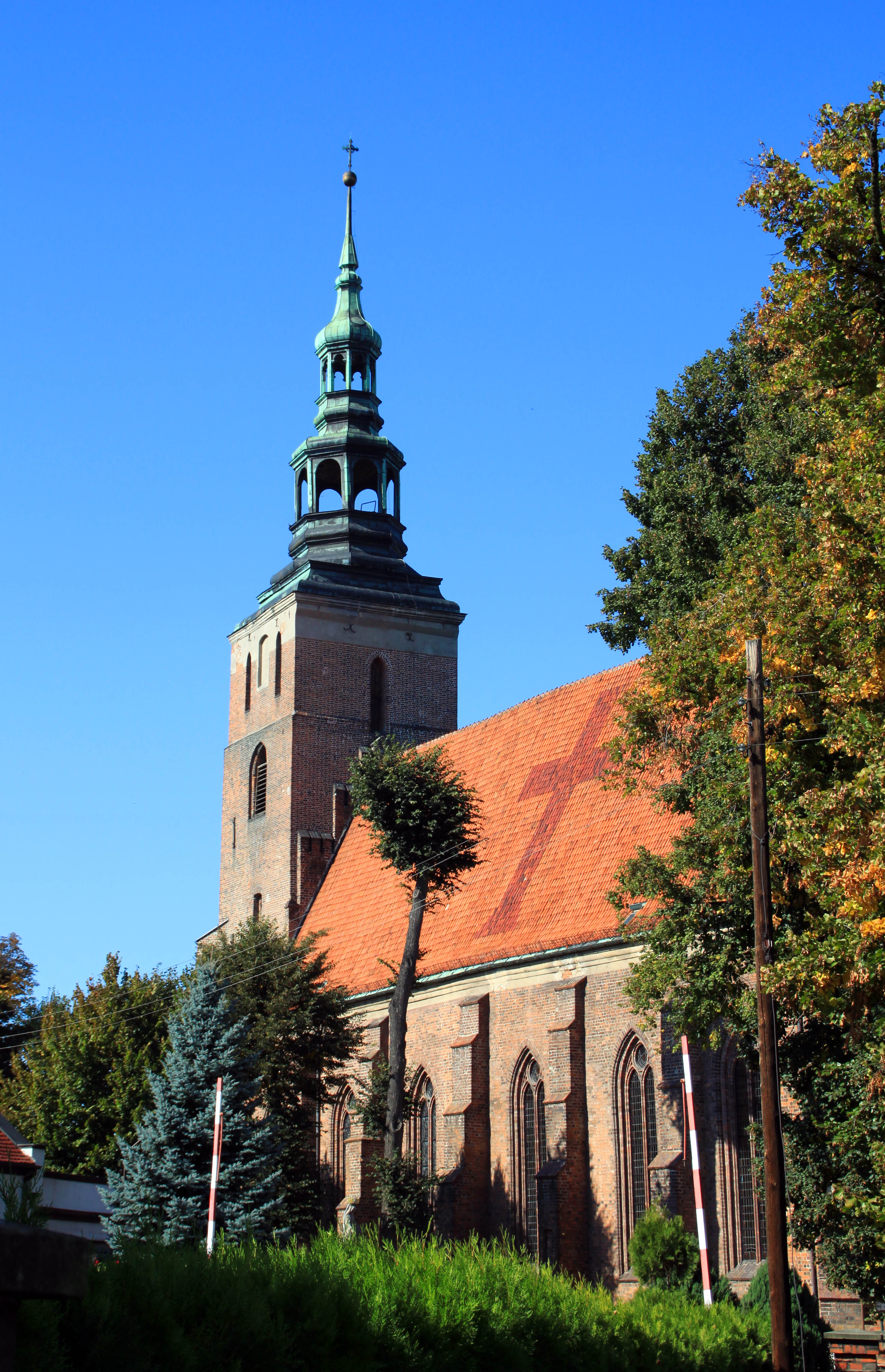
Gothic Church of St. Mary

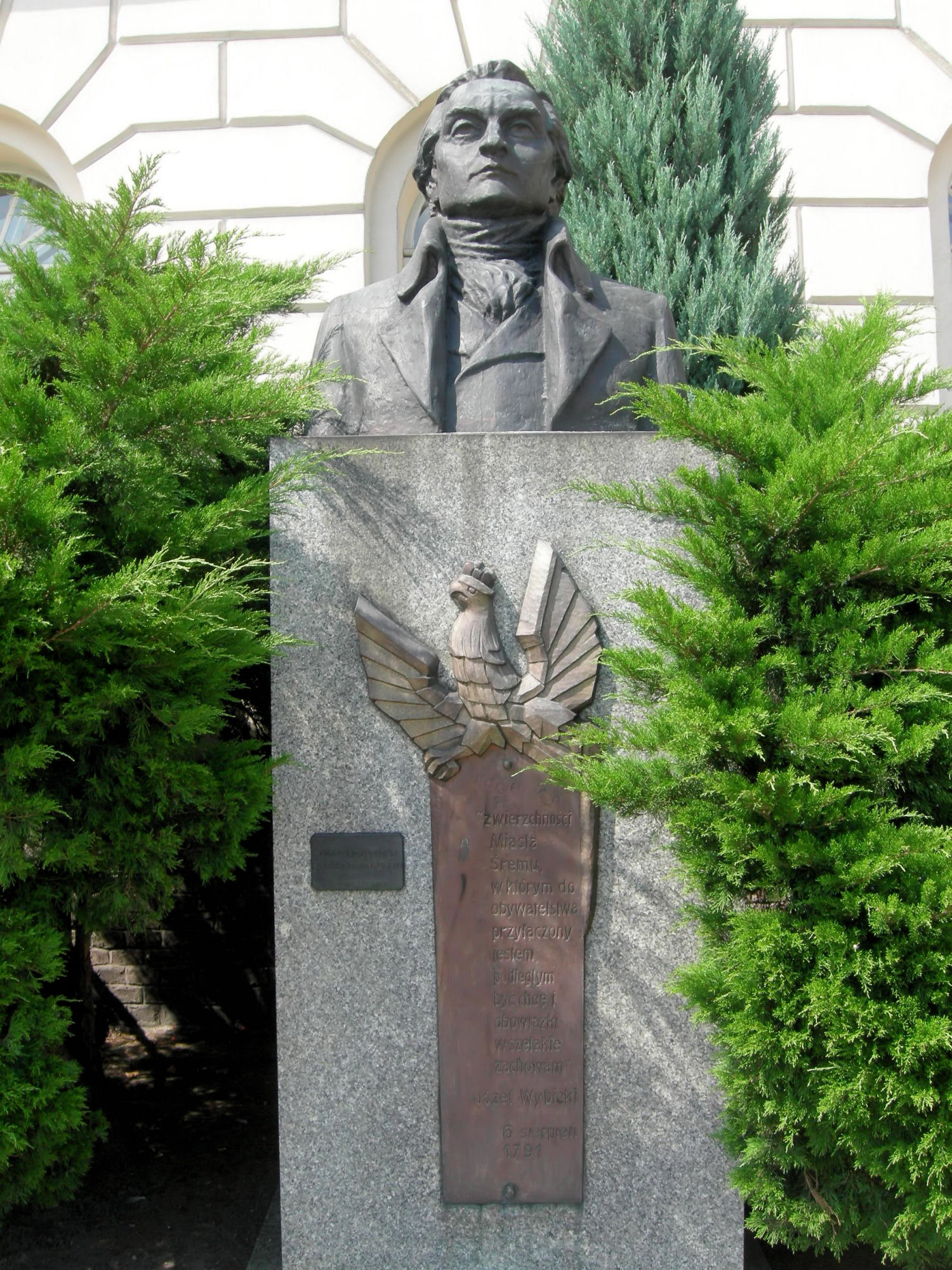
Józef Wybicki monument

== Sports ==
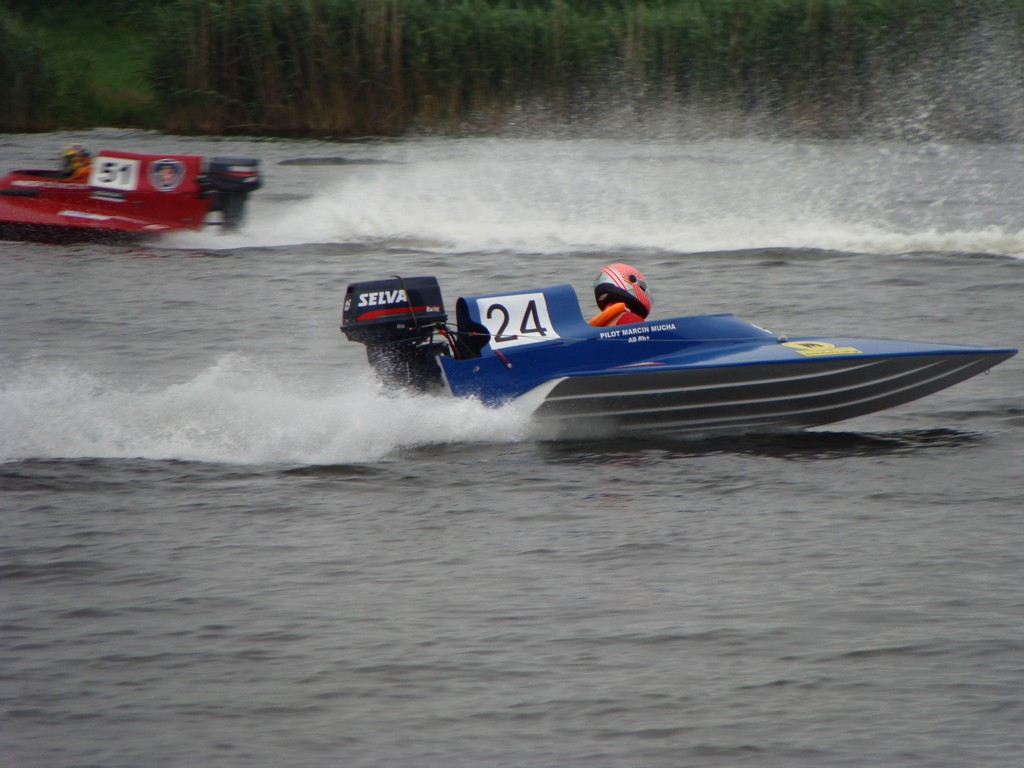
Water sports in Śrem

There are multiple sports facilities in Śrem: pitches, a stadium, a swimming pool, bowling alleys, gyms, and a yacht club with a landing stage on Lake Grzymisławskie. Śrem is the starting point of almost all major marked cycling routes in the region.

The local football club is Warta Śrem. It competes in the lower leagues. City Śrem also has powerboat representative.

== Notable people ==
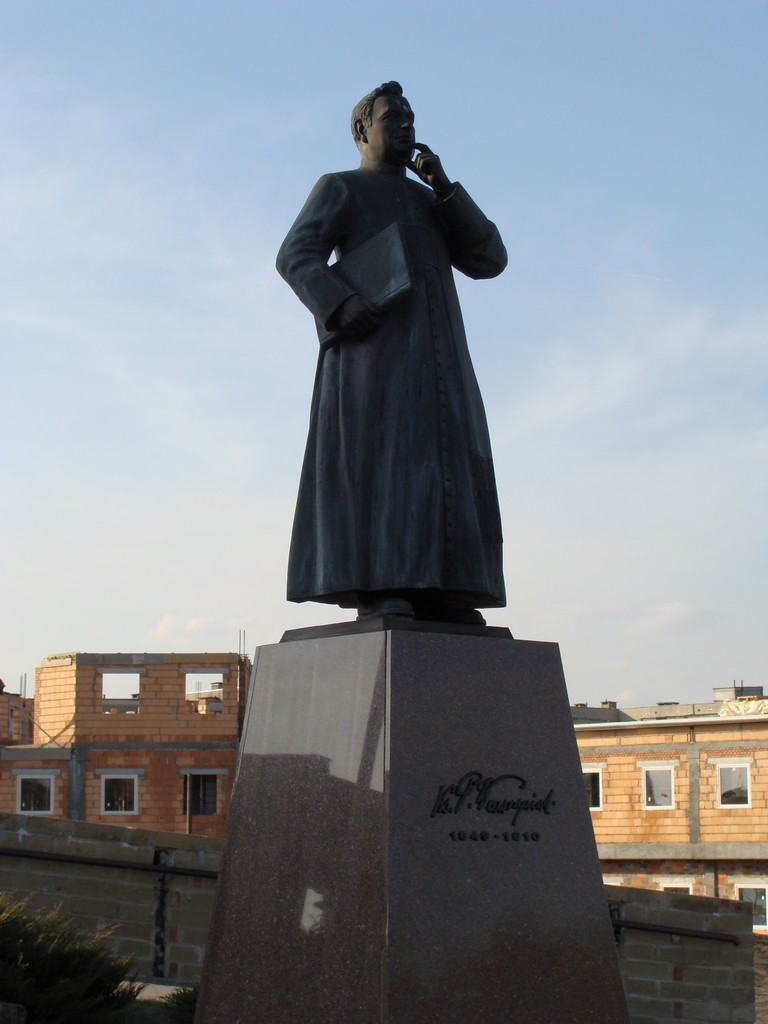
Piotr Wawrzyniak monument

- Julius Schreiber (1848–1932), internist
- Piotr Wawrzyniak (1849–1910), priest, economic and educational activist
- Francis J. Borchardt (1849–1915), member of the Wisconsin State Assembly
- Józef Surzyński (1851–1919), composer, conductor, historian
- Ludwik Wiesiołowski (1854–1892), painter
- Teodor Jeske-Choiński (1854–1920), Polish intellectual, writer and historian, attended school in Śrem
- Ludwik Mycielski (1854–1926), Polish politician, attended school in Śrem
- Heliodor Święcicki (1854–1923), gynecologist and philanthropist
- Eugen Mittwoch (1876-1942), rabbi
- Hermann Schreiber (1882-1954), rabbi, philosopher and journalist
- Wolf-Dietrich Wilcke (1913–1944), Luftwaffe pilot
- Włodzimierz Kolanowski (1913–1944), Polish Air Force officer, who co-organized the Great Escape from the Stalag Luft III POW camp, attended school in Śrem
- Jerzy Jurga (1940–2009), painter and crossbow designer
- Krzysztof Budzyń (born 1957), entrepreneur and amateur historian
- Zenon Jaskuła (born 1962), Olympic medalist and pro cyclist
- Roman Giertych (born 1971), politician, historian, lawyer, former Deputy Prime Minister of Poland
- Jakub Paś (born 1977), scientist
- Patrycja Wyciszkiewicz (born 1994), Olympic sprinter
- Dawid Kurminowski (born 1999), footballer
