= Marianowo, Śrem County =

Marianowo
- Village
- Location within Poland
- Coordinates: 52°6′N 16°53′E
- Country: Poland
- Voivodeship: Greater Poland
- County: Śrem
- Gmina: Śrem
- Elevation: 90 m (300 ft)
- Population: 40

Marianowo [marjaˈnɔvɔ] is a village in the administrative district of Gmina Śrem, within Śrem County, Greater Poland Voivodeship, in west-central Poland.
