= Kujawki, Greater Poland Voivodeship =

Kujawki
- Village
- Location within Poland
- Coordinates: 52°54′N 17°25′E
- Country: Poland
- Voivodeship: Greater Poland
- County: Wągrowiec
- Gmina: Gołańcz

Kujawki ([kuˈjafki]; German: Schwarzacker) is a village in the administrative district of Gmina Gołańcz, within Wągrowiec County, Greater Poland Voivodeship, in west-central Poland.
