= Piotr Wawrzyniak =

Polish priest and economist

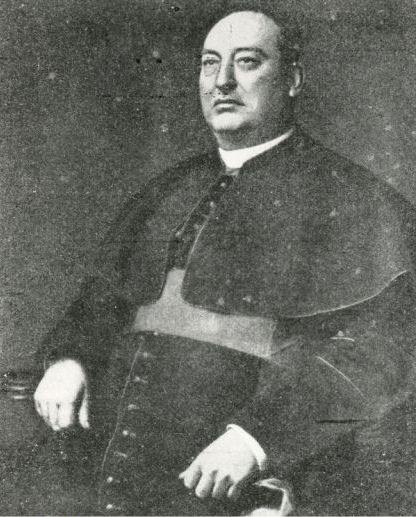
- Born: January 30, 1849; Wyrzeka, Poland
- Died: November 9, 1910 (aged 61); Poznań, Poland
- Occupation(s): Priest, economic and educational activist

Piotr Wawrzyniak (30 January 1849 in Wyrzeka – 9 November 1910 in Poznań) was a Polish priest, economic and educational activist, patron of the Union of the Earnings and Economic Societies (Związek Spółek Zarobkowych i Gospodarczych).

== See also ==
- Cooperative banking in Poland
