= Śrem County =

Śrem County Powiat śremski
- County
- Flag Coat of arms

- Location within the voivodeship
- Coordinates (Śrem): 52°5′N 17°1′E
- Country: Poland
- Voivodeship: Greater Poland
- Seat: Śrem
- Gminas: Total 4: Gmina Brodnica; Gmina Dolsk; Gmina Książ Wielkopolski; Gmina Śrem

Area
  - Total: 574.41 km^{2} (221.78 sq mi)

Population (2006)
  - Total: 58,646
  - Density: 102.10/km^{2} (264.43/sq mi)
  - Urban: 34,430
  - Rural: 24,216
- Car plates: PSE
- Website: www.powiat-srem.pl

Śrem County (Polish: powiat śremski) is a unit of territorial administration and local government (powiat) in Greater Poland Voivodeship, west-central Poland. It came into being on January 1, 1999, as a result of the Polish local government reforms passed in 1998. Its administrative seat and largest town is Śrem, which lies 36 kilometres (22 mi) south of the regional capital Poznań. The county also contains the towns of Książ Wielkopolski, lying 15 km (9 mi) east of Śrem, and Dolsk, 12 km (7 mi) south of Śrem.

The county covers an area of 574.41 square kilometres (221.8 sq mi). As of 2006 its total population is 58,646, out of which the population of Śrem is 30,227, that of Książ Wielkopolski is 2,724, that of Dolsk is 1,479, and the rural population is 24,216.

== Neighbouring counties ==
Śrem County is bordered by Poznań County to the north, Środa County to the north-east, Jarocin County to the east, Gostyń County to the south and Kościan County to the west.

== Administrative divisions ==
The county is subdivided into four gminas (three urban-rural and one rural). These are listed in the following table, in descending order of population.

Gmina	Type	Area (km^{2})	Population (2006)	Seat
Gmina Śrem	urban-rural	205.8	39,841	Śrem
Gmina Książ Wielkopolski	urban-rural	147.9	8,429	Książ Wielkopolski
Gmina Dolsk	urban-rural	124.8	5,732	Dolsk
Gmina Brodnica	rural	95.9	4,644	Brodnica
