= Gajewo =

Gajewo may refer to the following places:

- Gajewo, Czarnków-Trzcianka County in Greater Poland Voivodeship (west-central Poland)
- Gajewo, Śrem County in Greater Poland Voivodeship (west-central Poland)
- Gajewo, Golub-Dobrzyń County in Kuyavian-Pomeranian Voivodeship (north-central Poland)
- Gajewo, Lubusz Voivodeship (west Poland)
- Gajewo, Pomeranian Voivodeship (north Poland)
- Gajewo, Warmian-Masurian Voivodeship (north Poland)
- Gajewo, Drawsko County in West Pomeranian Voivodeship (north-west Poland)
- Gajewo, Koszalin County in West Pomeranian Voivodeship (north-west Poland)
