= Ludwik Marteau =

Polish court painter (c. 1715 – 1804)

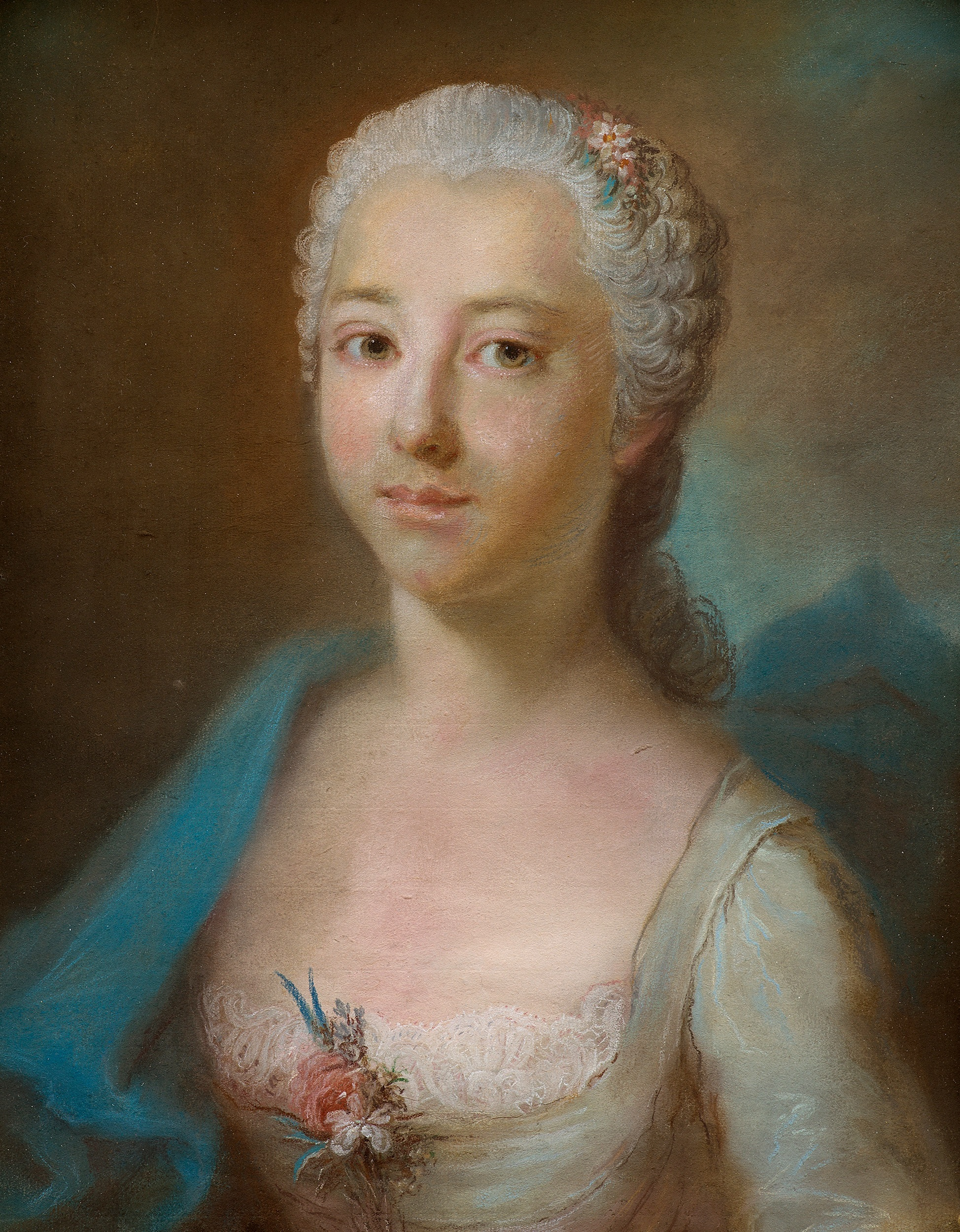
Portrait of 15-year-old Izabela Czartoryska (1761)

Ludwik Marteau, originally Louis-François Marteau (c. 1715 – 2 November 1804), was a Polish court painter who served under kings Augustus III and Stanisław August Poniatowski. All of his known works are portraits; both full size and miniatures.

== Biography ==
Born in Paris, his father was a carpenter at the royal Palace of Versailles. One of his aunts on his mother's side was married to the Polish court painter, Louis de Silvestre. It is not known exactly when he arrived in Poland, but it appears that his teacher, Maurice Quentin de La Tour made the recommendation to go and Silvestre arranged for his position there.

In 1752, on the way, he spent some time at the court of Jan Klemens Branicki in Białystok, where he painted portraits of the hetman's family. Once in Warsaw, King August III gave him the position of court painter. Initially, he lived at one of Branicki's manors then, from 1768 to 1780, he lived near the Royal Castle.

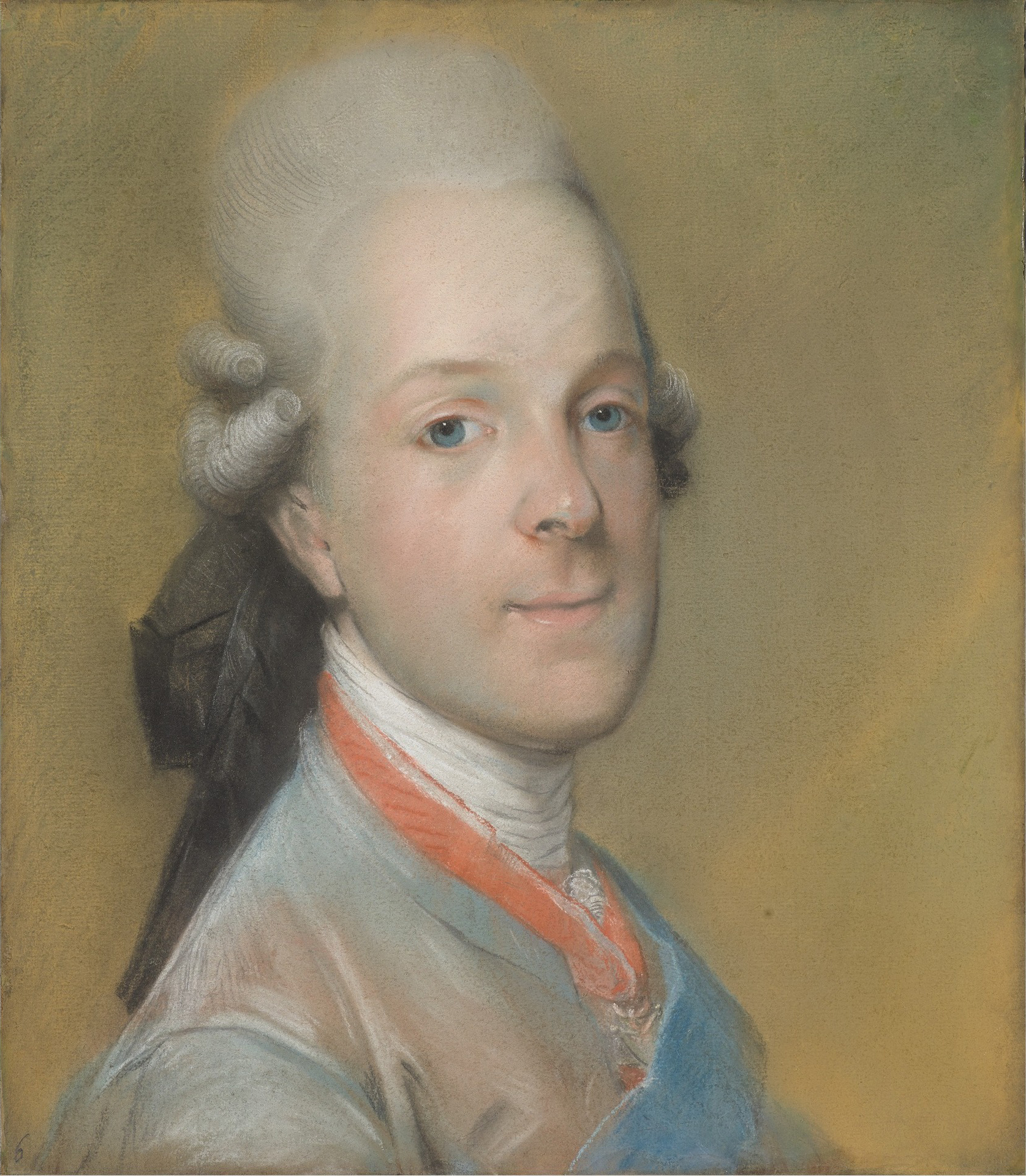
Michał Jerzy Mniszech

From 1780-1783, he gave lessons to Anna Rajecka, a favorite of King Stanisław August Poniatowski, who was meant to become a court painter, but spent most of her life in Paris. Later, her husband, Pierre-Marie Gault de Saint-Germain, would give Marteau a prominent place in his history of French painting.

According to the art historian, Edward Rastawiecki, Marteau was a bit of a fop and always dressed in French style, even sporting short pants and white stockings in the middle of winter, and refusing to attend the fanciest affair if there was too much mud or snow on the streets.

From 1765 to 1795, he is shown on Royal Records as "The King's Painter". He received a fixed salary as well as payments for each individual work. An art academy project that would have made him a professor at the annual rate of 300 ducats never materialized. He was given a monopoly on painting portraits of the guests that attended the King's famous Thursday Dinners. After the death of Stanisław August, he came under the protection of Princess Izabela Lubomirska, the King's cousin and a favorite, whose father had forbidden her to marry the King when she was a girl.

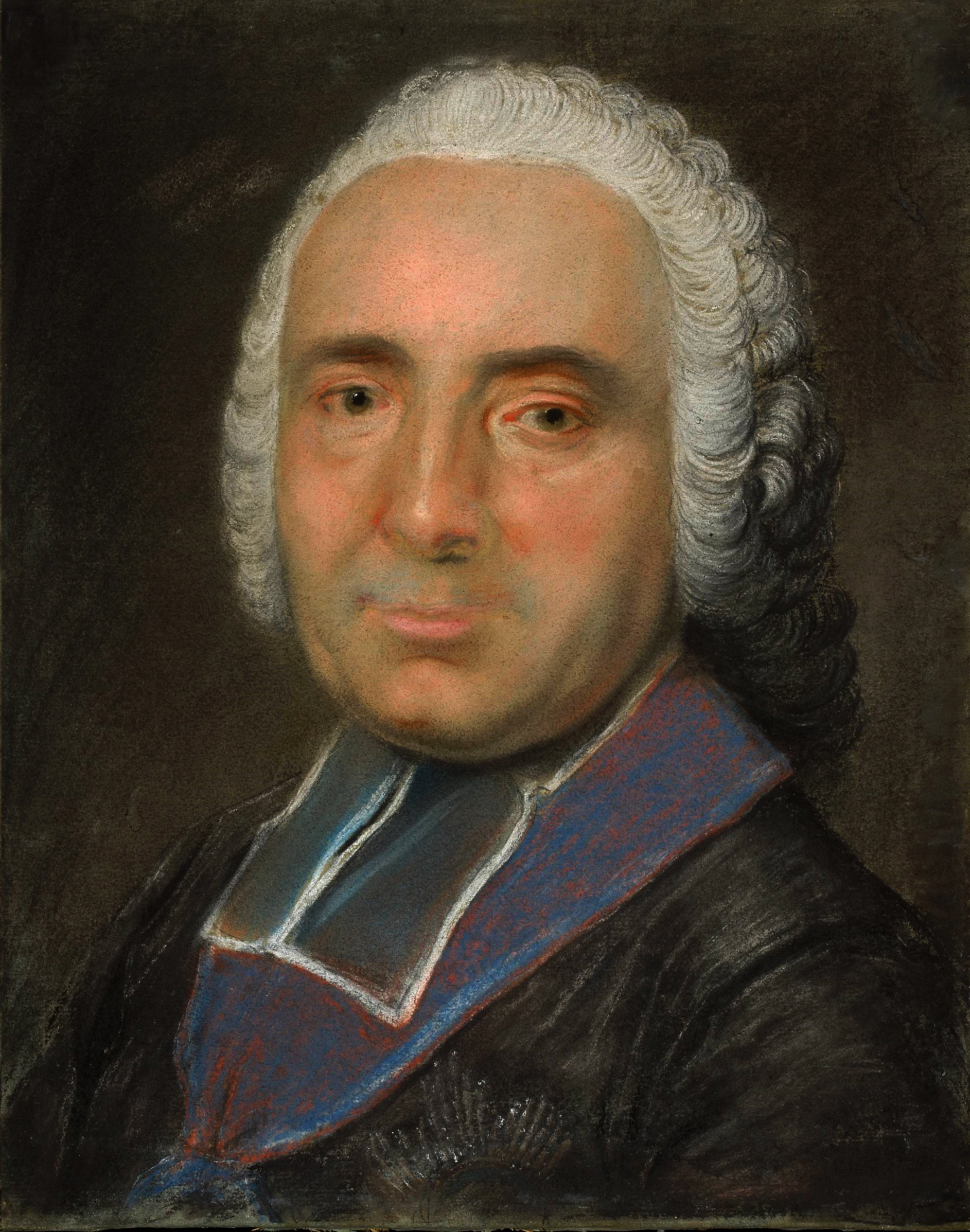
Andrzej Młodziejowski

In many instances, attribution is difficult to ascertain, as Marteau did not sign his paintings. Even so, his catalogued portraits constitute a who's-who of notable 18th century Poles, including Stanisław Konarski, Adam Naruszewicz, Ignacy Krasicki, Joachim Chreptowicz, Celestyn Czaplic, Michał Jerzy Mniszech, Ignacy Potocki, Andrzej Mokronowski, Stanisław Poniatowski, Stanisław Trembecki, Andrzej Hieronim Zamoyski, Grzegorz Piramowicz, Franciszek Bohomolec and (one of his best-known) Hugo Kołłątaj. In 1831, following the November Uprising, most of his portraits were transported to Saint Petersburg by order of Tsar Nicholas I. Three years later, they were burned in an effort to destroy significant records of Polish culture.
