= Masłowski =

Masłowski (feminine: Masłowska) or Maslowski is a Polish and Ashkenazic toponymic surname, referring to someone from any of numerous places named Masłowo, Masłowice or Masłów. Notable people with the surname include:

- Bolesław Masłowski (1851–1928), Polish chemist
- Dorota Masłowska (born 1983), Polish writer, playwright, columnist and journalist
- Gabriela Masłowska (born 1950), Polish politician
- Maciej Masłowski (1901–1976), Polish art historian
- Mateusz Masłowski (born 1997), Polish volleyball player
- Matt Maslowski (born 1949), American football player
- Michał Masłowski (born 1989), Polish footballer
- Mike Maslowski (born 1974), American football player
- Mirosława Masłowska (1943–2023), Polish politician and surgeon
- Piotr Masłowski (born 1988), Polish handball player
- Stanisław Masłowski (1853–1926), Polish painter
- Wiesław Masłowski, Polish-American research professor
- Władysław Masłowski (1933–1986), Polish journalist and press researcher
