= Choiński =

Choiński (feminine: Choińska; plural: Choińscy) is a Polish surname. Notable people with this surname include:

- Aleksander Choiński (1892–1959) highly decorated pilot of Polish Armed Forces
- Jan Choinski (born 1996), British tennis player
- Ludmila Jeske-Choińska-Mikorska (1849–1898), Polish singer and composer
- Teodor Jeske-Choiński (1854–1920), Polish writer
