= Orliniec =

Orliniec may refer to the following places in Poland:

- Orliniec, Greater Poland Voivodeship, a settlement
- Orliniec, Pomeranian Voivodeship, a village
