= Grobelno =

Grobelno may refer to:

- Grobelno, Poland, a village in Malbork County in northern Poland
- Grobelno, Slovenia, a settlement in the municipalities of Šmarje pri Jelšah and Šentjur in eastern Slovenia
