= Rusocin =

Rusocin may refer to the following places:

- Rusocin, Greater Poland Voivodeship (west-central Poland)
- Rusocin, Opole Voivodeship (south-west Poland)
- Rusocin, Pomeranian Voivodeship (north Poland)
