= Teodor Kazimierz Czartoryski =

18th-century Polish Catholic bishop

His Excellency Teodor Kazimierz Czartoryski
- Bishop of Poznań
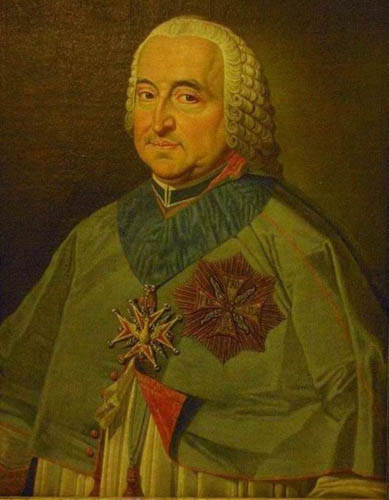
- Church: Poznań Cathedral
- Archdiocese: Archdiocese of Poznań
- Installed: 1739
- Term ended: 1768
- Predecessor: Stanisław Józef Hozjusz
- Successor: Andrzej Stanisław Młodziejowski

Personal details
- Born: ca. 1704
- Died: 1 March 1768 (aged 63–64) Dolsk, Poland
- Denomination: Roman Catholicism
- Coat of arms

Teodor Kazimierz Czartoryski (1704 – 1 March 1768 in Dolsk) was a bishop of Poznań and a member of the magnate family of Czartoryski in the Polish–Lithuanian Commonwealth. While he took good care of his ecclesiastical estates, he was much less involved in politics than his more famous brothers from the familia, August Aleksander Czartoryski and Michał Fryderyk Czartoryski.

== Biography ==
Czartoryski was chosen by his family to be a priest from the early childhood, receiving the title of canon when he was 13 years old. He studied in the jesuit Collegium Romanum in Rome and received the Holy Orders in 1727. Starting that year, the influence of familia resulted in him receiving a series of prosperous prebendaries, as well as becoming one of the ecclesiastical judges in the Crown Tribunal.

In 1729 Czartoryski returned to Rome, and with the support of France, the Czartoryski's familia secured his nomination for the bishop of Poznań (from 1732). However familia plans to secure the cardinal nomination for Teodor failed due to the pro-French faction defeat at the beginning of the War of the Polish Succession in the aftermath of the 1733 royal Polish election. The Poznań bishopry was denied to familia (and Teodor) until 1639, and even that grudgingly approved by the king of Poland, Augustus III, after the death of member of familia, primate of Poland, Teodor Andrzej Potocki.

Czartoryski, as a bishop, became one of the senators of Poland. His first speech at Sejm (Polish parliament) outlined the political plan of familia, proposing the reforms meant to prop the failing political system of the Commonwealth (Golden Freedoms). Specifically, he argued for modernising and enlarging the army, raising the taxes and support of the cities. However, Teodor was never fond of politics, taking part in Sejm deliberations only when he deemed it really necessary. In 1764 he caused a scandal, when bishop of Wilno, Ignacy Jakub Massalski was giving a speech defending hetman Jan Klemens Branicki, Teodor has fallen asleep and fallen on bishop Massalski, causing widespread amusement.

In his diocese, Czartoryski concentrated on economics and theology. He was seen as a tolerant – by some, even too tolerant – bishop in the matters dealing with non-Catholics, in 1750 allowing the first Lutheran burial in Warsaw. He was also known to disapprove of fasting, and when his court doctor "discovered" that the Polish plait is caused by the linum oil, he succeeded in obtaining a papal bull allowing him to eat dairy products during the fastings.

Czartoryski was concerned about the economics of his lands. In Warsaw, he established a commission to improve the condition of the city streets. In Poznań, he helped to reduce the city's debt, and the voivode of Poznań, Stefan Garczyński, complimented him in 1748 for those actions. In 1756 he spent a good part of the year traveling around his diocese, supporting the rebuilding of the town of Krobie which recently suffered a major fire. In the 1750s he also sponsored the reconstruction of the Archcathedral Basilica of St. Peter and St. Paul, Poznań, as well as the bishop's palace in Ostrów Tumski.

Unlike many of the contemporary magnates, Czartoryski's lifestyle was relatively modest, and he preferred his smaller palace in Dolsk to the lavish residence of Poznań's bishop in Ciążeń. He was known as a music connoisseur, and played harpsichord and viola.

King Augustus III died in 1763. Familia decided to support the candidate, Stanisław August Poniatowski, but other Polish neighbours also tried to influence the beginning of the royal election. Prussian army entered Wielkopolska, including the Poznań Voivodship, trying to show the might of Prussia, and Teodor, together with other Poznań officials, sent a protest note to Potsdam. He also supported politics of familia and secured the support of the Poznań region deputies to the election sejm.

At that time Czartoryski was beginning to suffer from weak health. In 1765 he and his private doctor Nathanael Matthaeus von Wolf went to Spa, Belgium. In 1766 he tried to take part in the new Sejm, but because of poor health his influence on it was negligible, and he had no influence on the turbulent events in the last months of his life, notably the Radom Confederation and the Repnin Sejm. He died on 1 March 1768 in his palace at Dolsk.

== Bibliography ==
- Grodziski S., Polska w czasach przełomu (1764-1815), Kraków 2001, ISBN 83-85719-45-8, s. 36.
- Wiesiołowski J., Katalog biskupów poznańskich, Poznań 2004, ISBN 83-89525-26-7

Preceded by Stanisław Józef Hozjusz	Bishop of Poznań; 1739–1768	Succeeded by Andrzej Stanisław Młodziejowski
