= Międzychód (disambiguation) =

Międzychód is a town in Międzychód County Greater Poland Voivodeship (west-central Poland).

Międzychód may also refer to:

- Międzychód County
- Międzychód, Śrem County in Greater Poland Voivodeship (west-central Poland)
- Międzychód, Warmian-Masurian Voivodeship (north Poland)
