= Pinkas =

Pinkas (Hebrew: פנקס) or Pinchas (Hebrew: פנחס) may refer to:

- Pinkes, Jewish record book
- Pinkas (surname), Jewish surname
- Pinchas (given name), Jewish given name
- Pinkas Synagogue, Prague, Czech Republic
- Pinkas haKehilot, volume of a book series on Eastern European countries' Jewish communities

== See also ==
- Pinka, a river in Central Europe
- Pinka, Greater Poland Voivodeship
- Phinehas (disambiguation)
