= Gawrony, Śrem County =

Gawrony
- Village
- Location within Poland
- Coordinates: 52°2′N 17°2′E
- Country: Poland
- Voivodeship: Greater Poland
- County: Śrem
- Gmina: Dolsk
- Population: 70

Gawrony [ɡaˈvrɔnɨ] is a village in the administrative district of Gmina Dolsk, within Śrem County, Greater Poland Voivodeship, in west-central Poland.
