= Tragamin =

- Village
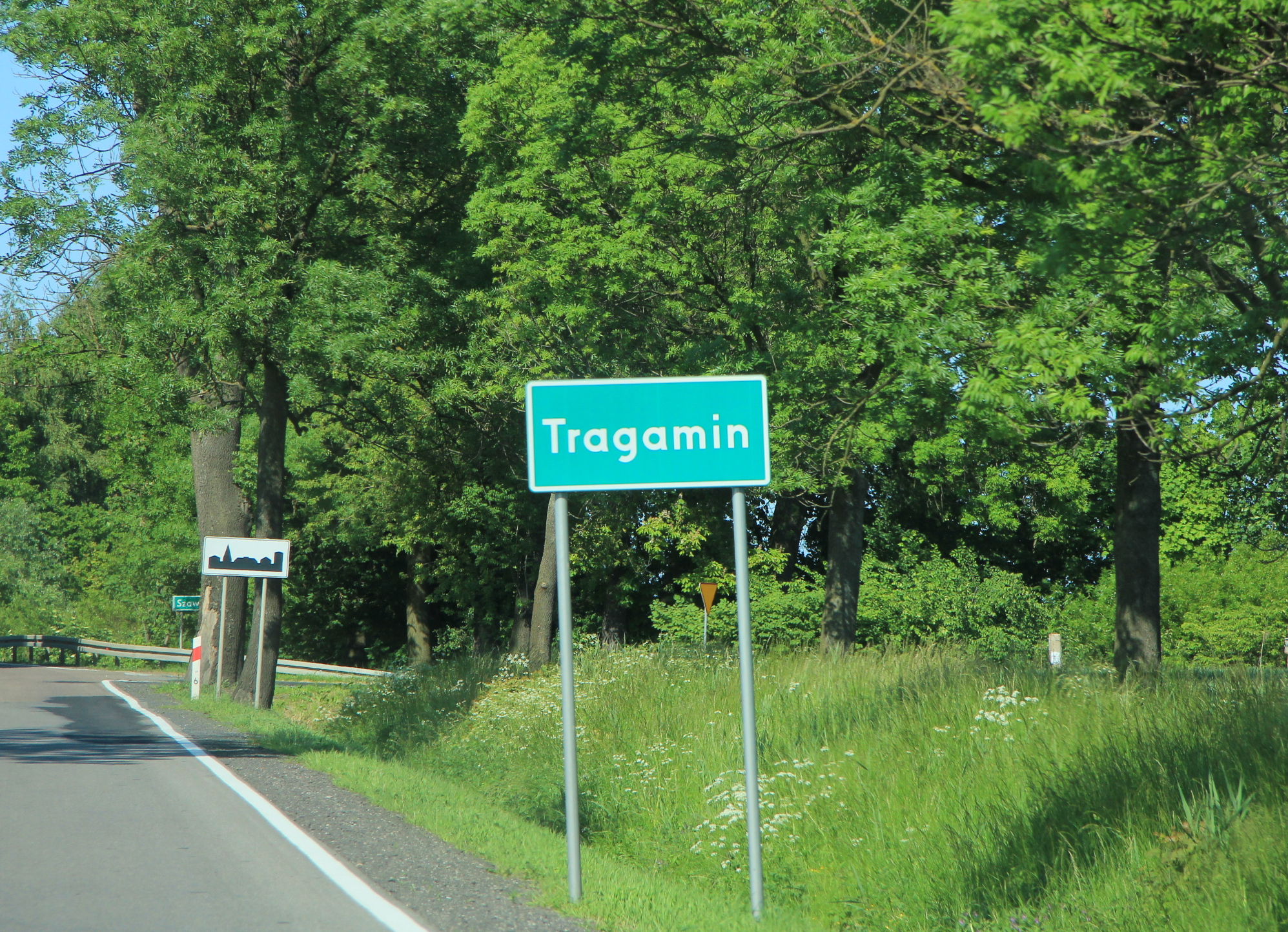

- Location within Poland
- Coordinates: 54°4′41″N 19°2′39″E
- Country: Poland
- Voivodeship: Pomeranian
- County: Malbork
- Gmina: Malbork
- Population: 501

Tragamin [traˈɡamin] is a village in the administrative district of Gmina Malbork, within Malbork County, Pomeranian Voivodeship, in northern Poland.

Before 1772, the area was part of the Kingdom of Poland, and in 1772-1919 it was part of Prussia and Germany. It was also part of Free City of Danzig from 1920 to 1939, and from 1939 to February 1945 was under the rule of Nazi Germany. For the history of the region, see History of Pomerania.
