= Andrzej Stanisław Młodziejowski =

Polish–Lithuanian nobleman, politician and priest (1717 – 1780)

- Bishop of Poznań
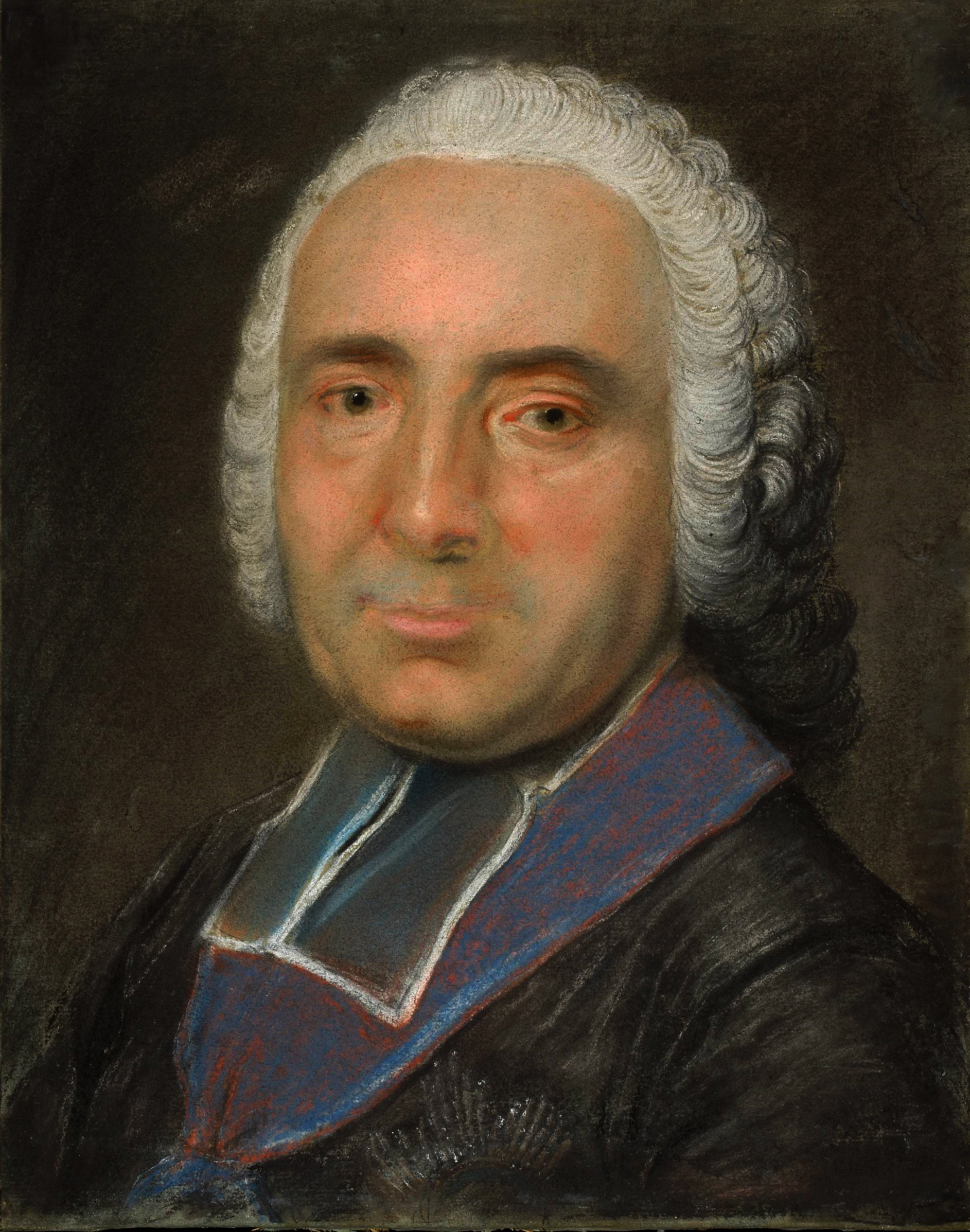
- Portrait of Młodziejowski by Ludwik Marteau
- Other post: Grand Chancellor of the Crown (1767 – 1780)
- Previous post: Bishop of Przemyśl (1766 – 1768)

Orders
- Ordination: 6 July 1740
- Consecration: 2 February 1767 by Władysław Aleksander Łubieński

Personal details
- Born: 30 November 1717 Goszczanów, Polish-Lithuanian Commonwealth (now Poland)
- Died: 20 February 1780 (aged 62) Warsaw, Polish-Lithuanian Commonwealth (now Poland)

Andrzej Mikołaj Stanisław Kostka Młodziejowski (30 November 1717 – 20 February 1780), of the Korab coat of arms, was a Polish–Lithuanian nobleman, politician and priest. Młodziejowski served as Grand Chancellor of the Crown from 1767, and bishop of Poznań from 1768, until his death in 1780. He previously served as bishop of Przemyśl from 1766 to 1768 and as deputy chancellor of the crown from 1764 to 1767.

Młodziejowski was one of the Polish nobles and politicians in service to the Russian embassy, receiving financial support from them as early as 1763 and supporting Russian activity that eventually led to the First Partition of Poland. He was accused of corruption, immorality, and of involvement with the alleged poisoning and death of primate of Poland Władysław Aleksander Łubieński.

== Biography ==
=== Early life and ecclesiastical career ===
Młodziejowski was born on 30 November 1717 in Goszczanów to Stanisław Młodziejowski and Marianna Dominikowska. He was baptized on 6 December of the same year, receiving the baptismal name Andrzej Mikołaj. After completing general studies, he began attending seminary in Gniezno, where he was tonsured and ordained to the minor orders by Józef Michał Trzciński on 5 July 1733. He was ordained to the subdiaconate on 1 July 1740, the diaconate on 2 July 1740, and finally to the priesthood on 6 July 1740.

Shortly after his ordination, Młodziejowski served as a teacher, as well as a chaplain to Andrzej Stanisław Załuski and Alberico Archinto. He was appointed as archdeacon of Pszczew on 9 July 1744. After his election as rector of Santo Stanislao dei Polacchi on 1 February 1748, he traveled with Archinto to Rome in March 1748, where he was a representative for the Polish episcopate to the Roman Curia; he was re-elected as rector of Santo Stanislao dei Polacchi on 14 May 1749, and would continue to serve in the position until 1757. While in Rome, he was installed as canon of the cathedral chapter at Kraków on 14 July 1749. In 1750, he returned to Poland, serving as Andrzej Załuski's auditor-general and chancellor until Załuski's death in 1758. During this period, he obtained a doctorate of both laws from the Sapienza University of Rome on 29 April 1755.

In January 1758, Młodziejowski was appointed chancellor for the Diocese of Gniezno. Initially, he rejected the appointment and handed it over to Adam Krasiński, though he would eventually accept it on 9 December 1762. He was later appointed coadjutor administrator of the abbey in Hebdów in 1764, and was also appointed administrator for the abbey church in Czerwińsk nad Wisłą in 1766. On 31 October of the same year, he was nominated as bishop of Przemyśl by Stanisław August Poniatowski; he was consecrated on 2 February 1767 at the parish church of Skierniewice by Władysław Aleksander Łubieński, assisted by Antoni Kazimierz Ostrowski and Józef Andrzej Załuski.

After the death of Teodor Kazimierz Czartoryski, the bishop of Poznań, on 1 March 1768, Młodziejowski was named as Pontiatowski's preferred candidate in a letter sent to its cathedral chapter 4 days after, on 5 March. In accordance with the king's wishes, the cathedral chapter elected Młodziejowski as the bishop of Poznań on 5 March; his election was confirmed by the Holy See on 16 May 1768. However, he didn't assume control of the diocese until 27 June 1779, when he ceremonially entered the diocese's cathedral church. During his entire tenure, he did not stay once in the diocese, and instead had Stefan Skrzebowski administer the diocese in his place.

=== Political career ===
Młodziejowski's political career began in the General Sejm, speaking in various ordinary and extraordinary sessions on behalf of the cathedral chapter of Gniezno with the assistance of Ignacy Cieński. He began to receive money from the Russian embassy in Warsaw in 1763, while he was still chancellor of Gniezno. He was then nominated by Stanisław August Pontiatowski to serve as vice-chancellor of the crown in December 1764; Witold Filipczak suggested that this nomination was made easier due to his financial connections to the Russian embassy. In 1765, he was awarded the Order of Saint Stanislaus.

In October 1767, after the resignation of Andrzej Hieronim Zamoyski, Młodziejowski was appointed Grand Chancellor of the Crown through the intervention of Russian ambassador Nikolai Vasilyevich Repnin. As Grand Chancellor, he primarily served as an intermediary between Stanisław August Pontiatowski and the Russian embassy, including the ambassador Otto Magnus von Stackelberg. While Młodziejowski continued to receive payments from the Russian embassy — including payments for his pension, beginning in 1773 — the relationship between the two parties began to decline towards the late 1770s, and was further worsened by conflicts between Młodziejowski and the Sułkowski family, whose patron was Stackelberg. This relationship with the Russian embassy, including the payments made to him, was revealed after his death in an issue of the Gazeta Rządowa published on 31 August 1794, after participants in the Kościuszko Uprising occupied the Russian embassy in Warsaw and seized its archives.

When the Partition Sejm was called in 1773, Młodziejowski, alongside others, helped Adam Poniński to turn it into a confederated sejm so that it would not be disrupted by use of the liberum veto; he was also appointed to the committee of thirty that dealt with the matters at hand, and ultimately, on 18 September 1773, signed the treaty that formalized the First Partition of Poland. On 11 April 1774, he was appointed by Stanisław August Pontiatowski to serve on the Permanent Council.

=== Death and burial ===
Młodziejowski died on 20 March 1780, at the age of 63; he was buried on 1 April at St. John's Archcathedral in Warsaw. In his will, he left 10,000 złoty from his estate (amounting to approximately 1.9 million złoty, according to his testament and final will) towards music for the archcathedral. He also allotted several thousand złoty towards repairing the Archcathedral.

== Criticism ==
Młodziejowski's legacy has been largely criticized due to his ties to the Russian embassy in Warsaw. Given these connections, he has been referred to as a "mercenary" for the Russian embassy; Polish historian Władysław Konopczyński called him "Father Machiavelli" for the same reason. Edward Lewinski-Corwin, commenting on his involvement in the Partition Sejm, referred to him in his Political History of Poland as "dishonourable" and "ready to sell [his] country and honor for Russian gold". He was also accused of having immoral activity with various women, and suspected of having poisoned (and killed) the previous archbishop of Gniezno, Władysław Aleksander Łubieński, in 1767. Feliks Łubieński is stated to have begun the alleged poisoning, and its attribution to Młodziejowski, as a rumor and a "family tradition", with various historians attempting to lend credit to the theory. Regardless of where it began, it was dismissed by historian Emanuel Rostworowski as part of "highly uncertain rumors and speculations", which served as a convenient excuse for Łubieński's poor health.

Despite this negative criticism, recent scholarship has noted Młodziejowski's role in shaping court policy, as well as in shaping the provincial activities of royalists in the Commonwealth.

== See also ==
- Młodziejowski Palace in Warsaw

Government offices
Preceded by Andrzej Zamoyski	Grand Chancellor of the Crown; 1767–1780	Succeeded by Jan Andrzej Borch
Religious titles
Preceded by Walenty Wężyk	Bishop of Przemyśl; 1766–1768	Succeeded by Józef Tadeusz Kierski
Preceded by Teodor Kazimierz Czartoryski	Bishop of Poznań; 1768–1780	Succeeded by Antoni Onufry Okęcki
