= Maliny, Greater Poland Voivodeship =

Maliny
- Settlement
- Location within Poland
- Coordinates: 51°59′N 17°4′E
- Country: Poland
- Voivodeship: Greater Poland
- County: Śrem
- Gmina: Dolsk

Maliny [maˈlinɨ] is a settlement in the administrative district of Gmina Dolsk, within Śrem County, Greater Poland Voivodeship, in west-central Poland.
