= Kadzyń =

- Village
- Location within Poland
- Coordinates: 52°0′N 17°7′E
- Country: Poland
- Voivodeship: Greater Poland
- County: Śrem
- Gmina: Dolsk
- Elevation: 80 m (260 ft)

Kadzyń [ˈkad͡zɨɲ] is a village in the administrative district of Gmina Dolsk, within Śrem County, Greater Poland Voivodeship, in west-central Poland.
