= Nathanael Matthaeus von Wolf =

German botanist, physician and astronomer

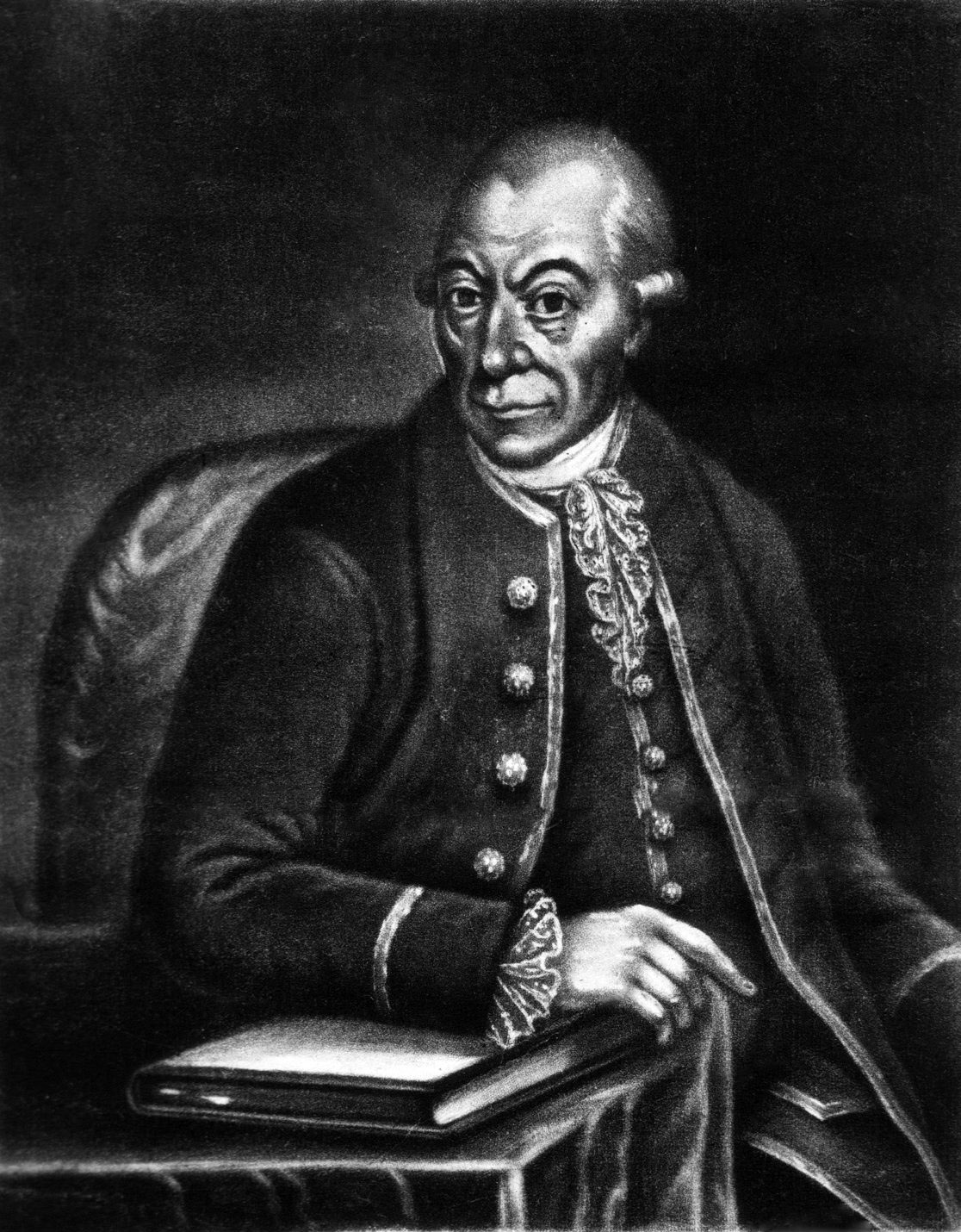
Nathanael Matthaeus von Wolf.

Nathanael Matthaeus von Wolf, Nathanael Matthäus von Wolf, Polish: Nataniel Mateusz Wolf (28 January 1724 in Konitz – 15 December 1784 in Gdańsk) was an ethnic German botanist, physician, and astronomer who lived most of his life in the Polish-Lithuanian Commonwealth.

Wolf was born in Chojnice (Konitz) in Royal Prussia, Crown of the Kingdom of Poland. He went to study medicine at the University of Erfurt and received his degree of M.D. in 1748. He became the personal physician of Teodor Kazimierz Czartoryski, the Prince-bishop of Poznań, until the bishop's death in 1768. The next year he opened a private office at Tczew and then following the First Partition of Poland in 1772 moved his practise to Danzig (Gdańsk) which remained part of Poland. He went on to spend most of his adult life in Danzig. He was elected a Fellow of the Royal Society in 1777.

As an astronomer, Wolf also taught the Corps of Cadets in Warsaw. He was a member of the Danzig Research Society (Naturforschende Gesellschaft Danzig) and left his scientific collections to them. He greatly supported the building of a planetarium.

On 10 May 1785, a few months after Wolf's death, the Danzig physician Philipp Adolph Lampe presented a memorial at the Danzig Research Society.

== Works ==
  - Genera Plantarum, Vocabulis characteristicis definita S.l. 1776
  - Genera et Species Plantarum vocabulis characteristicis definita. Marienwerder, Typis Joan. Jac. Kanteri, 1781
  - Concordantia Botanica. Dantisci, Muller, 1780
