= Lubiatowo, Greater Poland Voivodeship =

Lubiatowo
- Village
- Location within Poland
- Coordinates: 52°00′09″N 17°01′38″E
- Country: Poland
- Voivodeship: Greater Poland
- County: Śrem
- Gmina: Dolsk
- Population: 250
- Website: http://www.lubiatowo.pl.tl/

Lubiatowo [lubjaˈtɔvɔ] is a village in the administrative district of Gmina Dolsk, within Śrem County, Greater Poland Voivodeship, in west-central Poland.
