= Drzonek, Śrem County =

Drzonek
- Village
- Location within Poland
- Coordinates: 52°1′24″N 17°3′41″E
- Country: Poland
- Voivodeship: Greater Poland
- County: Śrem
- Gmina: Dolsk
- Elevation: 90 m (300 ft)
- Population: 310

Drzonek [ˈdʐɔnɛk] is a village in the administrative district of Gmina Dolsk, within Śrem County, Greater Poland Voivodeship, in west-central Poland.
