= Tiara i korona =

1900 novel by Teodor Jeske-Choiński

Tiara i korona is a novel by Polish writer Teodor Jeske-Choiński, first published in 1900. Political conflict and religious views are central to the novel which explores the famous dispute between the Emperor Henry IV and Pope Gregory VII.
