= Sadowo Pierwsze =

- Settlement
- Location within Poland
- Coordinates: 54°3′42″N 19°7′5″E
- Country: Poland
- Voivodeship: Pomeranian
- County: Malbork
- Gmina: Malbork

Sadowo Pierwsze [saˈdɔvɔ ˈpjɛrfʂɛ] is a settlement in the administrative district of Gmina Malbork, within Malbork County, Pomeranian Voivodeship, in northern Poland.

For the history of the region, see History of Pomerania.
