= Ostrowieczno =

- Village
- Location within Poland
- Coordinates: 51°59′N 17°7′E
- Country: Poland
- Voivodeship: Greater Poland
- County: Śrem
- Gmina: Dolsk
- Elevation: 110 m (360 ft)
- Population: 320

Ostrowieczno [ɔstrɔˈvjɛt͡ʂnɔ] is a village in the administrative district of Gmina Dolsk, within Śrem County, Greater Poland Voivodeship, in west-central Poland.
