= Mszczyczyn =

- Village
- Location within Poland
- Coordinates: 51°56′19″N 17°5′15″E
- Country: Poland
- Voivodeship: Greater Poland
- County: Śrem
- Gmina: Dolsk
- Population: 350

Mszczyczyn [ˈmʂt͡ʂɨt͡ʂɨn] is a village in the administrative district of Gmina Dolsk, within Śrem County, Greater Poland Voivodeship, in west-central Poland.
