= Anna Rajecka =

Polish artist (c. 1762 – 1832)

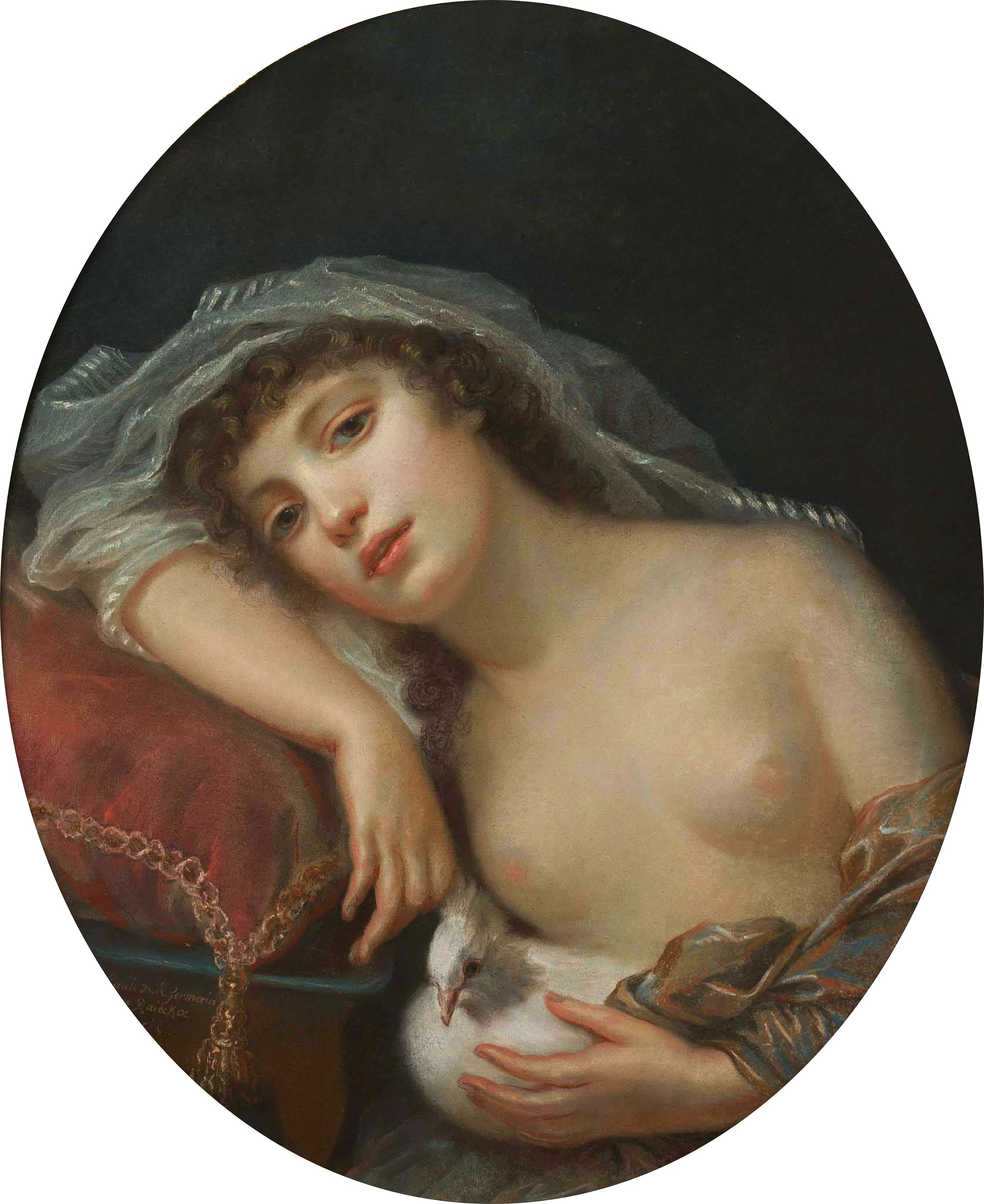
A Girl with a Dove (Dziewczyna z gołąbkiem), (Allegory of lost innocence), 1790

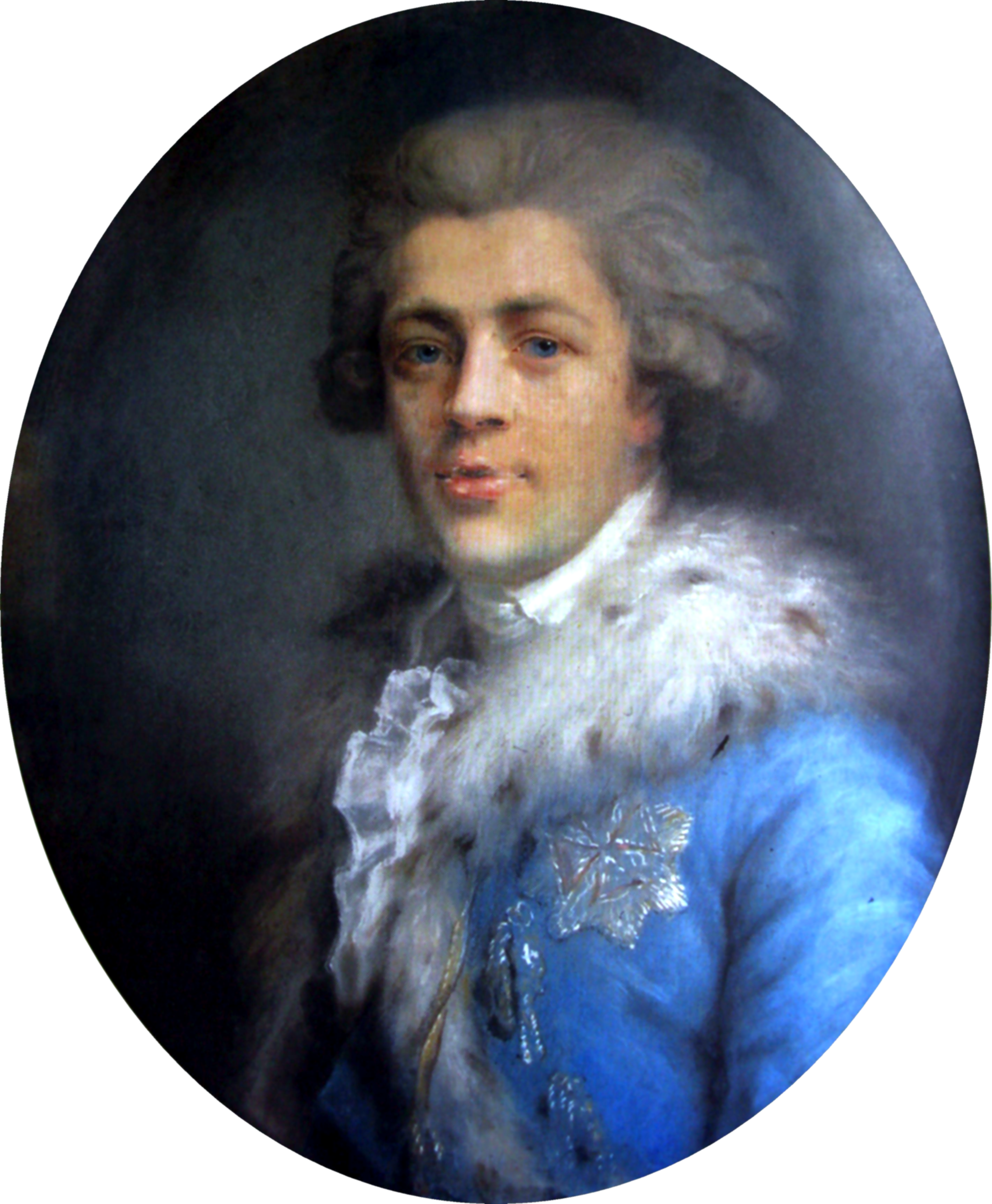
Portrait of Ignacy Potocki, 1784

Anna Rajecka (c. 1762 – 1832) was a Polish portrait painter and pastellist. She was also known as Madame Gault de Saint-Germain.

== Biography ==
She was born in Warsaw to a portrait painter named Józef Rajecki and raised as a protégée of king Stanisław August Poniatowski of Poland. It was at first believed that she was his illegitimate daughter and, later, that she was his mistress. In 1783, she was enrolled at his expense at the art school for females at the Louvre in Paris. She studied with Ludwik Marteau and Marcello Bacciarelli in Warsaw; Jean-Baptiste Greuze and possibly Élisabeth Vigée Le Brun in Paris. Although she later became part of the circle surrounding Jacques-Louis David, she probably took no lessons from him.

The purpose of the Polish king in paying for her education was that she should return to Poland and become a professor of art, but she chose to remain in Paris after her marriage to the miniaturist, Pierre-Marie Gault de Saint-Germain in 1788. She became the first Polish female to have her work represented at the Salon in 1791 and apparently continued to receive support from the king until 1792. Although she sent many paintings back to Warsaw, Bacciarelli considered few to be worthy of adding to the Royal Collection.

She painted the circle around the Polish royal court and, in Paris, received numerous commissions from the local aristocracy, thanks to the reluctant influence of the king's agent, Filippo Mazzei, who felt that she had little talent and was difficult to deal with.

During the Reign of Terror, she fled from Paris to Clermont-Ferrand and may have given up painting. Information on this period of her life is sparse but, after many years, she returned to Paris and is said to have become blind around 1824. She died in 1832 in Paris.

== Sources ==
- Anna Rajecka from the Dictionary of Pastellists Before 1800 by Neil Jeffares
- Stefan Kozakiewicz, Malarstwo polskie: oświecenie, klasycysm, romantyzm (Polish Painting. Enlightenment. Classicism. Romanticism), Auriga, Warsaw, 1976.
