= Gmina Dolsk =

Gmina Dolsk Dolsk Commune
- Gmina
- Coat of arms
- Interactive map of Gmina Dolsk
- Coordinates (Dolsk): 51°59′N 17°4′E
- Country: Poland
- Voivodeship: Greater Poland
- County: Śrem
- Seat: Dolsk

Area
  - Total: 124.76 km^{2} (48.17 sq mi)

Population (2006)
  - Total: 5,732
  - Density: 45.94/km^{2} (119.0/sq mi)
  - Urban: 1,479
  - Rural: 4,253
- Website: http://www.dolsk.pl/

Gmina Dolsk is an urban-rural gmina (administrative district) in Śrem County, Greater Poland Voivodeship, in west-central Poland. Its seat is the town of Dolsk, which lies approximately 12 kilometres (7 mi) south of Śrem and 48 km (30 mi) south of the regional capital Poznań.

The gmina covers an area of 124.76 square kilometres (48.2 sq mi), and as of 2006 its total population is 5,732 (out of which the population of Dolsk amounts to 1,479, and the population of the rural part of the gmina is 4,253).

== Villages ==
Apart from the town of Dolsk, Gmina Dolsk contains the villages and settlements of Błażejewo, Brzednia, Brześnica, Drzonek, Gajewo, Gawrony, Kadzyń, Kotowo, Księginki, Lipówka, Lubiatówko, Lubiatowo, Małachowo, Maliny, Mały Trąbinek, Masłowo, Mełpin, Międzychód, Mszczyczyn, Nowieczek, Orliniec, Ostrowieczko, Ostrowieczno, Pinka, Pokrzywnica, Rusocin, Trąbinek and Wieszczyczyn.

== Neighbouring gminas ==
Gmina Dolsk is bordered by the gminas of Borek Wielkopolski, Gostyń, Jaraczewo, Krzywiń, Książ Wielkopolski, Piaski and Śrem.
