= Kościeleczki =

- Village
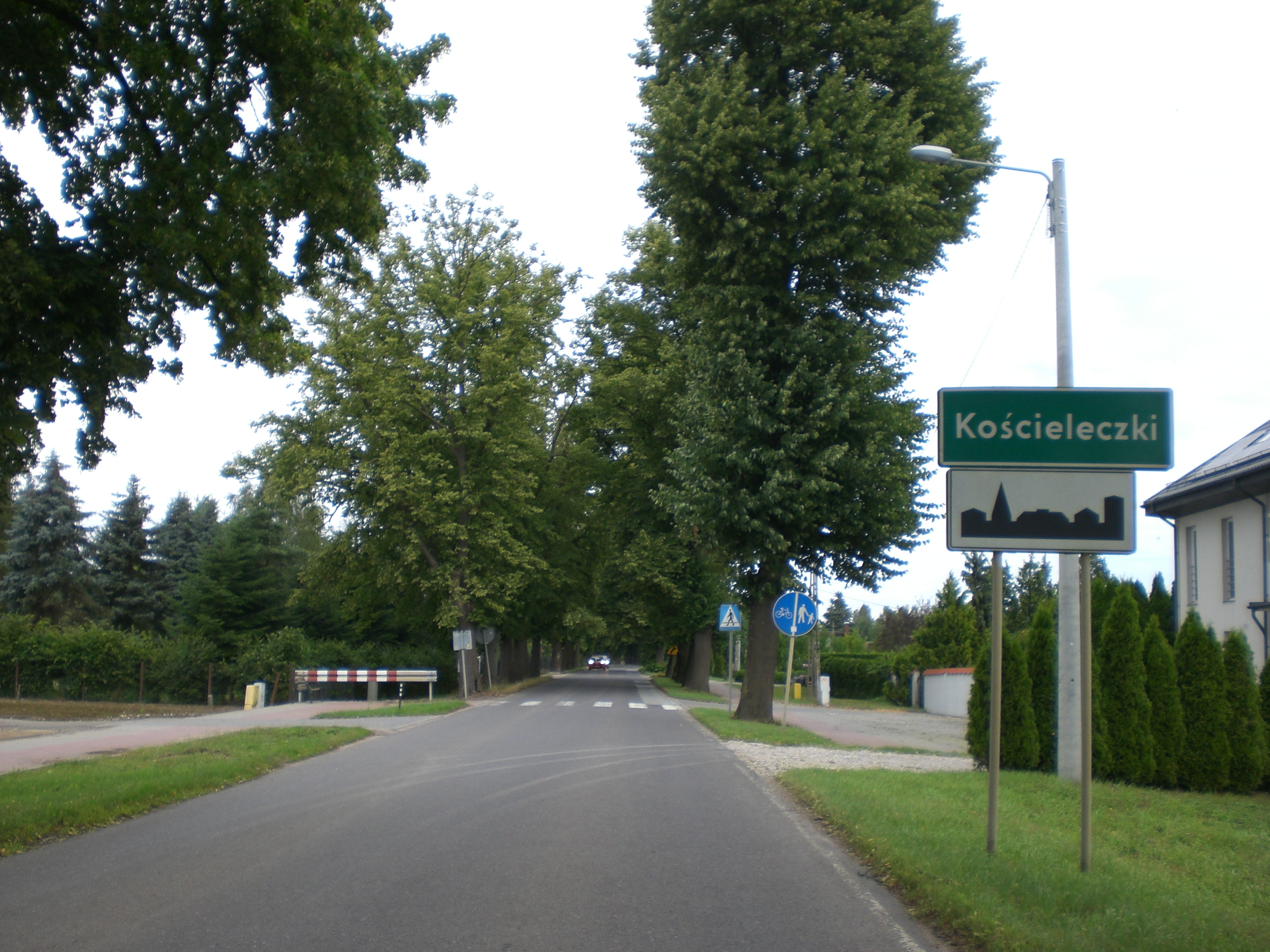

- Location within Poland
- Coordinates: 54°3′56″N 19°0′49″E
- Country: Poland
- Voivodeship: Pomeranian
- County: Malbork
- Gmina: Malbork
- Named for: Jan Kościelecki

Population
  - Total: 260
- Time zone: UTC+1 (CET)
  - Summer (DST): UTC+2 (CEST)
- Vehicle registration: GMB

Kościeleczki [kɔɕt͡ɕɛˈlɛt͡ʂki] is a village in the administrative district of Gmina Malbork, within Malbork County, Pomeranian Voivodeship, in northern Poland. It is located in the region of Powiśle.

== History ==
The village dates back to the medieval period. It was initially called Warnow or Warnaw. During the Thirteen Years' War of 1454–1466, in 1454, troops from Gdańsk stayed there, aiding the Polish siege of Malbork. The village was destroyed during the war. In 1471, King Casimir IV Jagiellon permitted starost of Malbork Jan Kościelecki to re-establish the village. Jan Kościelecki named the village Kościeleczki after himself, appointed a sołtys (village administrator) and funded a new church. During the Polish–Swedish War of 1626–1629, in 1628, the main camp of Swedish infantry was based here before a Polish offensive from Gniew pushed out the occupiers. In c. 1650, a Jesuit farming estate was founded. In 1700 Bishop Teodor Potocki handed over the church and parish to the Jesuits.

In the First Partition of Poland of 1772, the village was annexed by Kingdom of Prussia, and from 1871 it also formed part of the German Empire. In 1920-1939 it was part of the Free City of Danzig, then it was occupied by Nazi Germany in World War II, and eventually restored to Poland in 1945.
