= Gmina Malbork =

Gmina Malbork Malbork Commune
- Gmina
- Flag Coat of arms
- Interactive map of Gmina Malbork
- Coordinates (Malbork): 54°2′N 19°2′E
- Country: Poland
- Voivodeship: Pomeranian
- County: Malbork
- Seat: Malbork

Area
  - Total: 100.93 km^{2} (38.97 sq mi)

Population (2020)
  - Total: 4,798
  - Density: 47.54/km^{2} (123.1/sq mi)
- Website: http://www.gmina.malbork.pl/

Gmina Malbork is a rural gmina (administrative district) in Malbork County, Pomeranian Voivodeship, in northern Poland. Its seat is in the town of Malbork, although the town is not part of the territory of the gmina. Malbork is also the administrative seat or capital of Malbork County.

The gmina covers an area of 100.93 square kilometres (39.0 sq mi), and as of 2020 its total population is 4,798.

== Villages ==
Gmina Malbork contains the villages and settlements of Cisy, Czerwone Stogi, Gajewo, Grajewo Trzecie, Grobelno, Kałdowo, Kałdowo-Wieś, Kamienica, Kamienice, Kamionka, Kapustowo, Kościeleczki, Kraśniewo, Lasowice Małe, Lasowice Wielkie, Lasowice Wielkie Agro Lawi, Lipki, Nowa Wieś Malborska, Pielica, Sadowo Pierwsze, Stogi, Szawałd, Tragamin and Wielbark.

== Neighbouring gminas ==
Gmina Malbork is bordered by the town of Malbork and by the gminas of Lichnowy, Miłoradz, Nowy Staw, Stare Pole, Stary Targ and Sztum.
