= Teodor Jeske-Choiński =

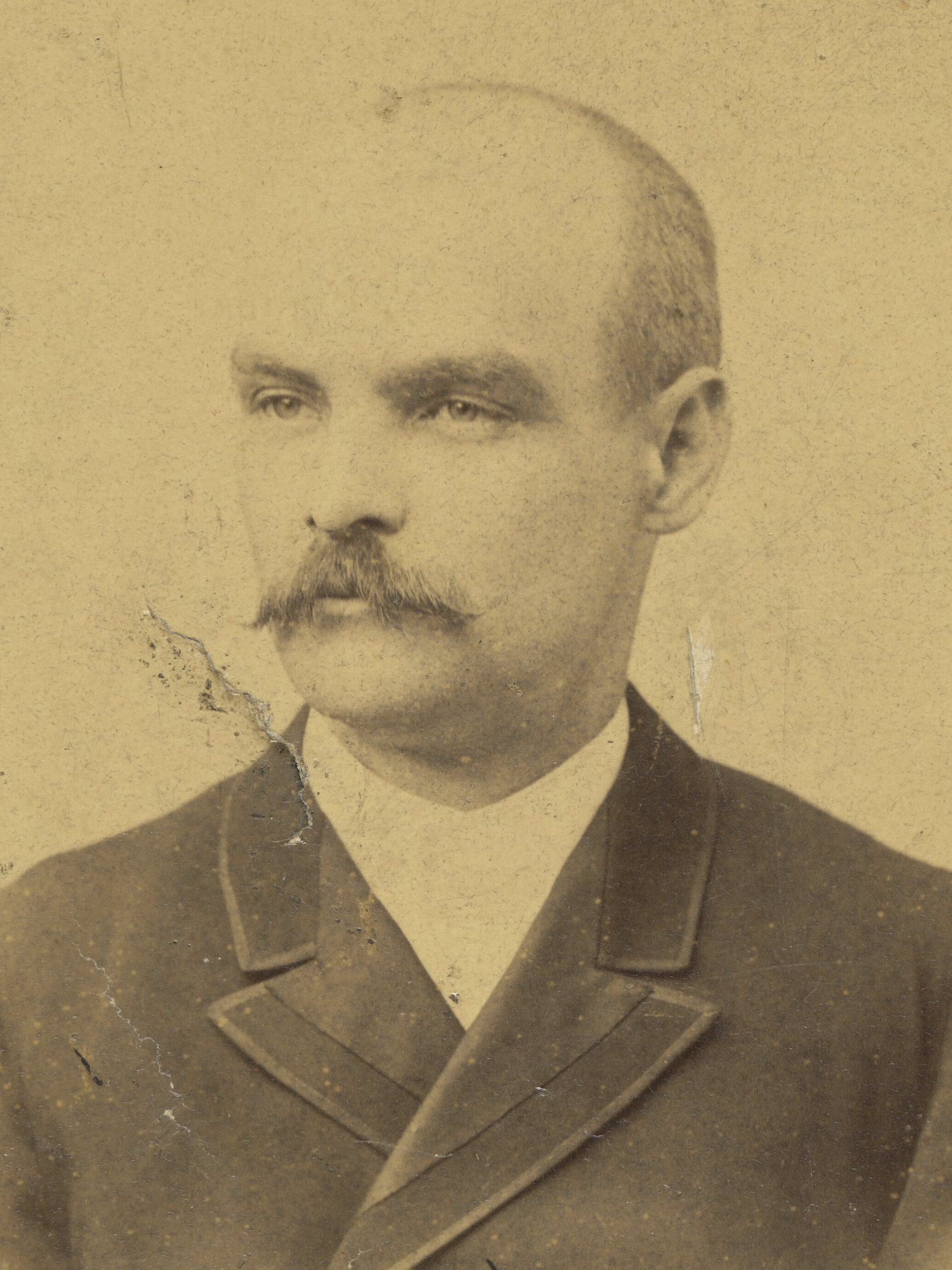
- Born: February 27, 1854; Pleschen, Kingdom of Prussia
- Died: April 14, 1920 (aged 66); Warsaw, Second Polish Republic
- Spouse: Ludmiła Jeske-Choińska
- Writing career
- Notable work: Tiara i korona
- Known for: Espousing the Judeopolonia conspiracy theory
- Parents: Fryderyk Jeske (father); Franciszka née Choińska (mother)

Signature
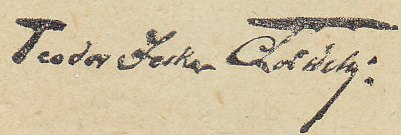

Teodor Jeske-Choiński (ru: Еске-Хоинский, Теодор. 27 February 1854 – 14 April 1920) was a Polish intellectual, writer, historian, and literary critic.

He was born to a bureaucrat, Fryderyk Jeske-Choiński, of the Abdank coat of arms, and Franciszka Choińska. Some sources suggest that the Jeske-Choiński family was of German origin.

He was a friend and opponent of Henryk Sienkiewicz. While Sienkiewicz's novels focused on Polish history, Jeske-Choiński’s looked at the broader European context. In 1900 he published Tiara i korona, a novel about the conflict between Emperor Henry IV and Pope Gregory VII.

Jeske-Choiński engaged in ideological debate with Warsaw's Positivists, who opposed the legacy of Romanticism and sought to reshape Poland's national priorities through education and the press. He saw their program as an attempt to impose a rigid intellectual hierarchy, and criticized their pragmatism and rejection of revolutionary aspirations.

Joanna Michlic has called him "[a] leading theorist and exponent of antisemitism in Poland". In 1951, Polish communist censors banned his books, so that Jeske-Choiński is largely forgotten by the Polish public.
