= Mały Trąbinek =

- Settlement
- Location within Poland
- Coordinates: 52°0′N 17°6′E
- Country: Poland
- Voivodeship: Greater Poland
- County: Śrem
- Gmina: Dolsk

Mały Trąbinek [ˈmawɨ trɔmˈbinɛk] is a settlement in the administrative district of Gmina Dolsk, within Śrem County, Greater Poland Voivodeship, in west-central Poland.
