= Kraśniewo, Pomeranian Voivodeship =

Kraśniewo
- Village
- Location within Poland
- Coordinates: 54°1′1″N 18°58′18″E
- Country: Poland
- Voivodeship: Pomeranian
- County: Malbork
- Gmina: Malbork
- Population: 230

Kraśniewo [kraɕˈɲɛvɔ] is a village in the administrative district of Gmina Malbork, within Malbork County, Pomeranian Voivodeship, in northern Poland.

Before 1772 the area was part of the Kingdom of Poland, from 1772 to 1919 of Prussia and Germany, from 1920 to 1939 of the Free City of Danzig, and from September 1939 to February 1945 of Nazi Germany. For the history of the region, see History of Pomerania.
