= Ostrowieczko =

- Village
- Location within Poland
- Coordinates: 51°58′53″N 17°5′45″E
- Country: Poland
- Voivodeship: Greater Poland
- County: Śrem
- Gmina: Dolsk

Ostrowieczko [ɔstrɔˈvjɛt͡ʂkɔ] is a village in the administrative district of Gmina Dolsk, within Śrem County, Greater Poland Voivodeship, in west-central Poland.
