= Szawałd =

- Village
- Location within Poland
- Coordinates: 54°3′46″N 19°7′7″E
- Country: Poland
- Voivodeship: Pomeranian
- County: Malbork
- Gmina: Malbork
- Population: 210

Szawałd [ˈʂavau̯t] is a village in the administrative district of Gmina Malbork, within Malbork County, Pomeranian Voivodeship, in northern Poland.

For the history of the region, see History of Pomerania.
