= Masłowo =

Masłowo may refer to the following places:

- Masłowo, Piła County in Greater Poland Voivodeship (west-central Poland)
- Masłowo, Rawicz County in Greater Poland Voivodeship (west-central Poland)
- Masłowo, Śrem County in Greater Poland Voivodeship (west-central Poland)
- Masłowo, Kartuzy County in Pomeranian Voivodeship (north Poland)
- Masłowo, Słupsk County in Pomeranian Voivodeship (north Poland)
