= Nowa Wieś Malborska =

- Village
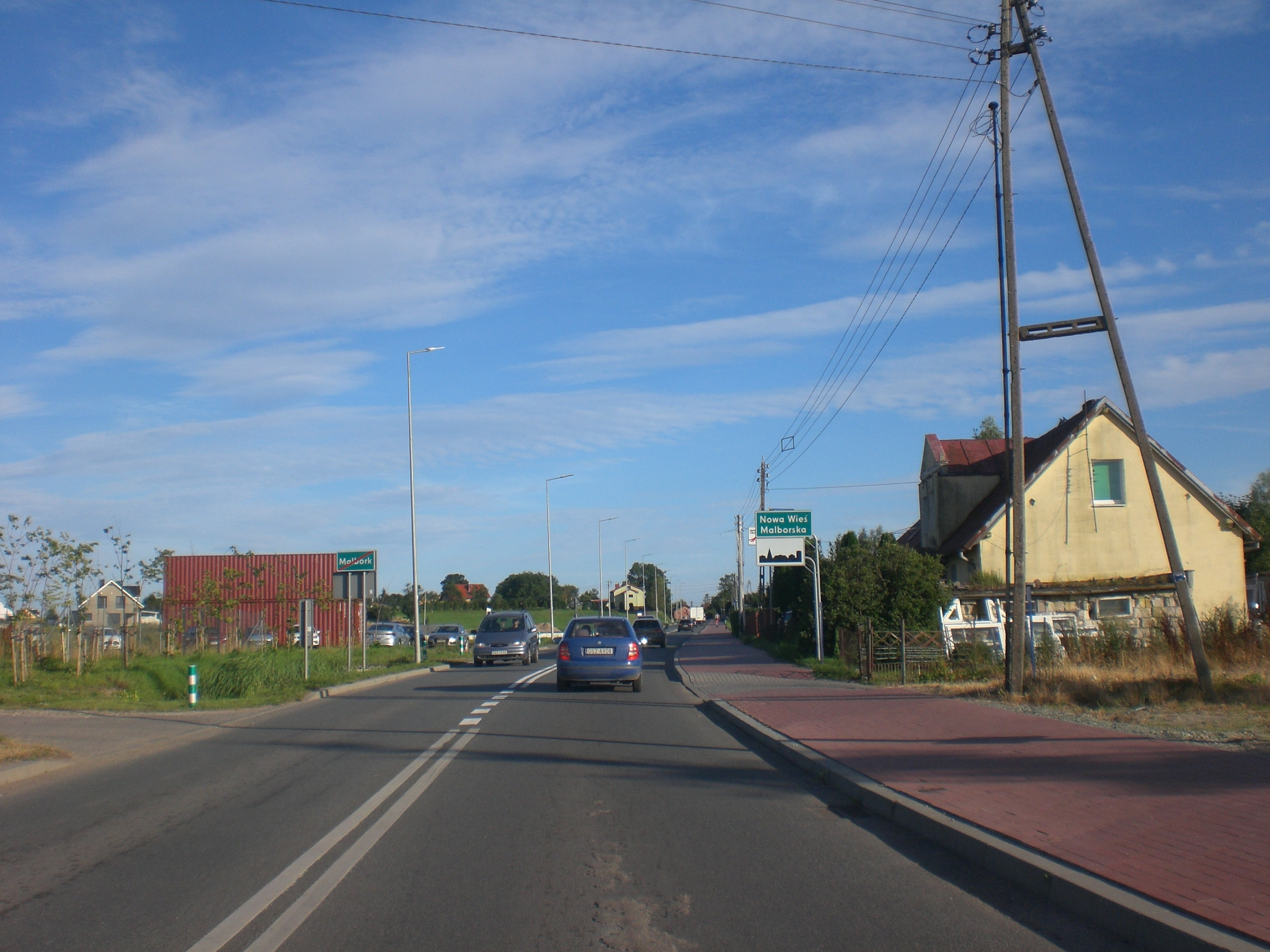

- Location within Poland
- Coordinates: 54°0′49″N 19°3′52″E
- Country: Poland
- Voivodeship: Pomeranian
- County: Malbork
- Gmina: Malbork
- Population: 380
- Time zone: UTC+1 (CET)
  - Summer (DST): UTC+2 (CEST)
- Vehicle registration: GMB

Nowa Wieś Malborska [ˈnɔva ˈvjɛɕ malˈbɔrska] is a village in the administrative district of Gmina Malbork, within Malbork County, Pomeranian Voivodeship, in northern Poland. The voivodeship road 515 runs through the village.
