= Lasowice Wielkie, Pomeranian Voivodeship =

Lasowice Wielkie
- Village
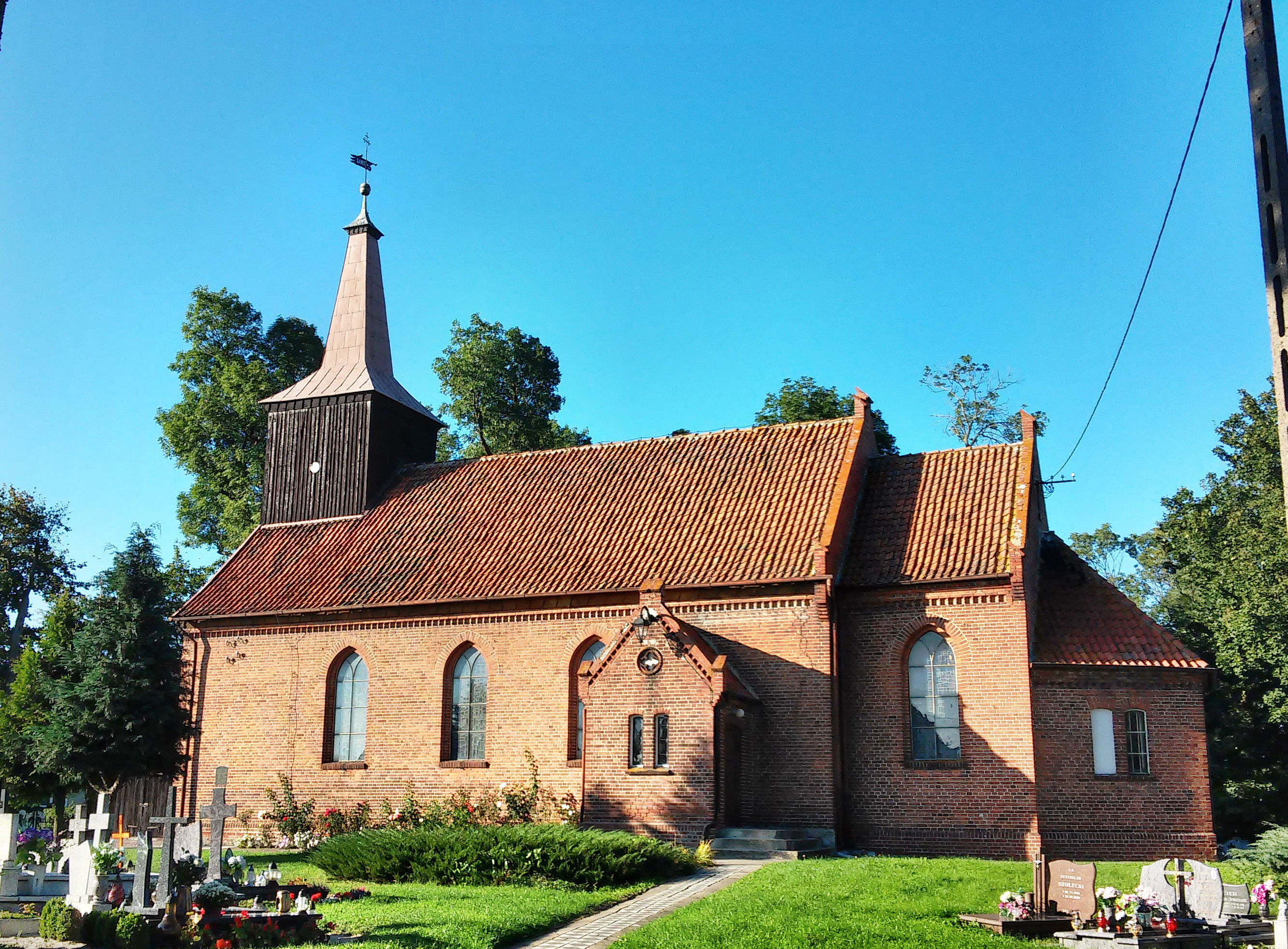
- Saint Andrew church in Lasowice Wielkie

- Location within Poland
- Coordinates: 54°5′22″N 19°4′27″E
- Country: Poland
- Voivodeship: Pomeranian
- County: Malbork
- Gmina: Malbork

Population
  - Total: 340

Lasowice Wielkie [lasɔˈvit͡sɛ ˈvjɛlkʲɛ] is a village in the administrative district of Gmina Malbork, within Malbork County, Pomeranian Voivodeship, in northern Poland.

== History ==
The village was part of the Kingdom of Poland until the First Partition of Poland in 1772, when it was annexed by Prussia. In 1871, it became part of Germany, then in 1920 of the Free City of Danzig (Gdańsk). During World War II, in 1939, it was annexed by Germany, which established a subcamp of the Stutthof concentration camp. Dozens of Poles were subjected to forced labour there. After Germany's defeat in the war, the village became again part of Poland.
