= Brześnica =

- Village
- Location within Poland
- Coordinates: 51°57′N 17°8′E
- Country: Poland
- Voivodeship: Greater Poland
- County: Śrem
- Gmina: Dolsk
- Elevation: 110 m (360 ft)
- Population: 110

Brześnica [bʐɛɕˈnit͡sa] is a village in the administrative district of Gmina Dolsk, within Śrem County, Greater Poland Voivodeship, in west-central Poland.
