= Lipki, Malbork County =

Lipki
- Settlement
- Location within Poland
- Coordinates: 54°0′22″N 19°4′18″E
- Country: Poland
- Voivodeship: Pomeranian
- County: Malbork
- Gmina: Malbork
- Population: 380

Lipki [ˈlipki] is a settlement in the administrative district of Gmina Malbork, within Malbork County, Pomeranian Voivodeship, in northern Poland.

Between the end of the 13th century and the 15th, the village lay in the territory of the Teutonic Knights. From 1466 until the First Partition of Poland, it was part of the Kingdom of Poland. After the partition, the region was part of Kingdom of Prussia and later the German Empire and Nazi Germany. In 1945 it became part of Poland again.
