= Brzednia =

- Settlement
- Location within Poland
- Coordinates: 51°59′24″N 17°0′12″E
- Country: Poland
- Voivodeship: Greater Poland
- County: Śrem
- Gmina: Dolsk

Brzednia [ˈbʐɛdɲa] is a settlement in the administrative district of Gmina Dolsk, within Śrem County, Greater Poland Voivodeship, in west-central Poland.
