= Lipówka, Greater Poland Voivodeship =

Lipówka
- Village
- Location within Poland
- Coordinates: 51°58′31″N 17°9′11″E
- Country: Poland
- Voivodeship: Greater Poland
- County: Śrem
- Gmina: Dolsk
- Population: 70

Lipówka [liˈpufka] is a village in the administrative district of Gmina Dolsk, within Śrem County, Greater Poland Voivodeship, in west-central Poland.
