= Lasowice Małe, Pomeranian Voivodeship =

Lasowice Małe
- Village
- Location within Poland
- Coordinates: 54°6′5″N 19°6′33″E
- Country: Poland
- Voivodeship: Pomeranian
- County: Malbork
- Gmina: Malbork
- Population: 80

Lasowice Małe [lasɔˈvit͡sɛ ˈmawɛ] is a village in the administrative district of Gmina Malbork, within Malbork County, Pomeranian Voivodeship, in northern Poland.

Before 1772 the area was part of Kingdom of Poland, in 1772-1919 and 1939-1945 of Prussia and Germany, and in 1920-1939 of Free City of Danzig. For the history of the region, see History of Pomerania.
