= Pielica =

- Village
- Location within Poland
- Coordinates: 54°4′21″N 19°5′18″E
- Country: Poland
- Voivodeship: Pomeranian
- County: Malbork
- Gmina: Malbork
- Population: 40

Pielica [pjɛˈlit͡sa] is a village in the administrative district of Gmina Malbork, within Malbork County, Pomeranian Voivodeship, in northern Poland.

For the history of the region, see History of Pomerania.
