= Orliniec, Greater Poland Voivodeship =

Orliniec
- Settlement
- Location within Poland
- Coordinates: 51°57′04″N 17°07′59″E
- Country: Poland
- Voivodeship: Greater Poland
- County: Śrem
- Gmina: Dolsk

Orliniec [ɔrˈliɲɛt͡s] is a settlement in the administrative district of Gmina Dolsk, within Śrem County, Greater Poland Voivodeship, in west-central Poland.
