= Masłowice =

Masłowice may refer to the following places:

- Masłowice, Radomsko County in Łódź Voivodeship (central Poland)
- Masłowice, Wieluń County in Łódź Voivodeship (central Poland)
- Masłowice, West Pomeranian Voivodeship (north-west Poland)
