= Edward Rastawiecki =

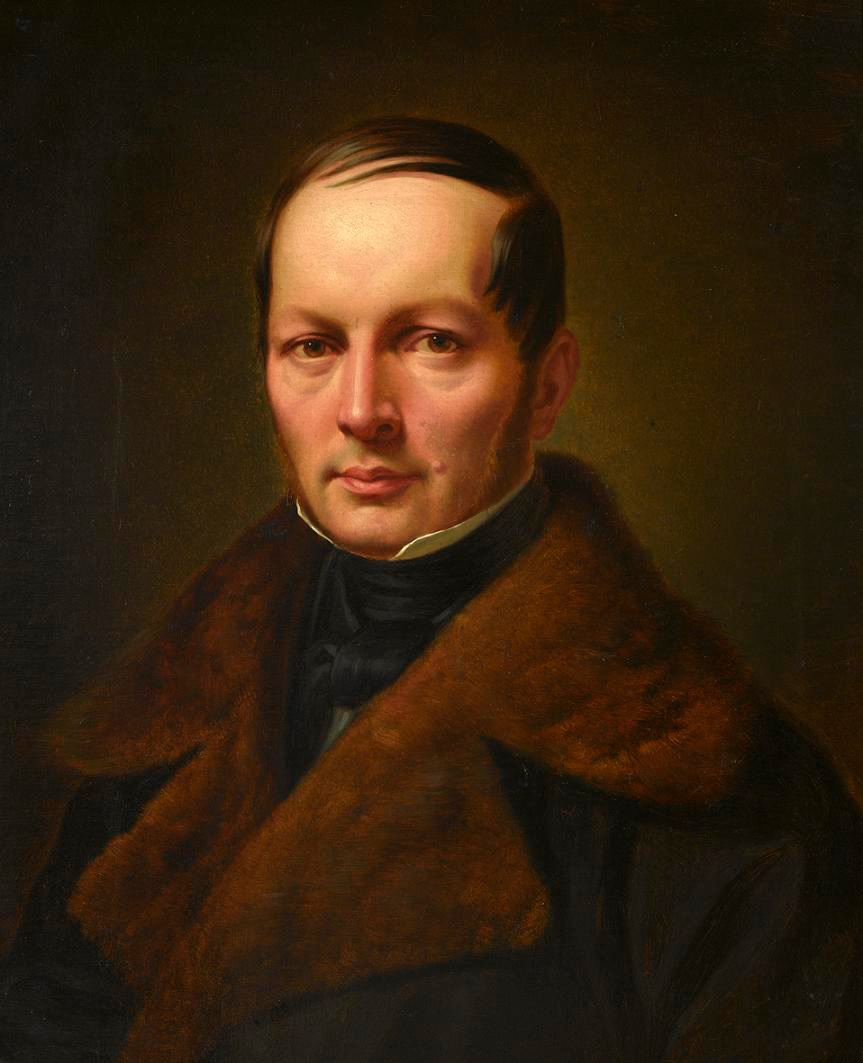
Edward Rastawiecki; portrait by Jan Ksawery Kaniewski

Baron Edward Rastawiecki (20 October 1804 in Nowosiółki – 23 February 1879 in Warsaw) was a Polish art historian.

He was a descendant of an aristocratic Polish family. His father was baron Ludwik Mikołaj Adam Rastawiecki. He finished the Liceum Warszawskie school in Warsaw. He then graduated in administration at Warsaw university. He worked in the National Bank of Poland. Later, he worked as chancellor in another bank, Towarzystwo Kredytowe Ziemskie.

His wife was Leonia Nakwaska (1818-1886). They had no children. Edward Rastawiecki died in his mansion on Mazowiecka street in Warsaw. He was buried on Cmentarz Powązkowski in Warsaw.

== Works ==
- Mapografia dawnej Polski, 1846;
- Słownik malarzy polskich tudzież obcych w Polsce osiadłych lub czasowo w niej przebywających, t. 1-3, 1850–1857;
- Słownik rytowników polskich, 1886;
- Wzory sztuki średniowiecznej i z epoki Odrodzenia w dawnej Polsce, 1853–1858
