= Grobelno, Poland =

Grobelno
- Village
- Location within Poland
- Coordinates: 54°1′47″N 19°0′34″E
- Country: Poland
- Voivodeship: Pomeranian
- County: Malbork
- Gmina: Malbork
- Population: 150

Grobelno [ɡrɔˈbɛlnɔ] is a village in the administrative district of Gmina Malbork, within Malbork County, Pomeranian Voivodeship, in northern Poland.

Before 1772 the area was part of Kingdom of Poland, in 1772-1919 and 1939–1945 to Prussia and Germany, and in 1920–1939 to Free City of Danzig. For the history of the region, see History of Pomerania.
