= Ludmila Jeske-Choińska-Mikorska =

Polish singer and composer (1849–1898)

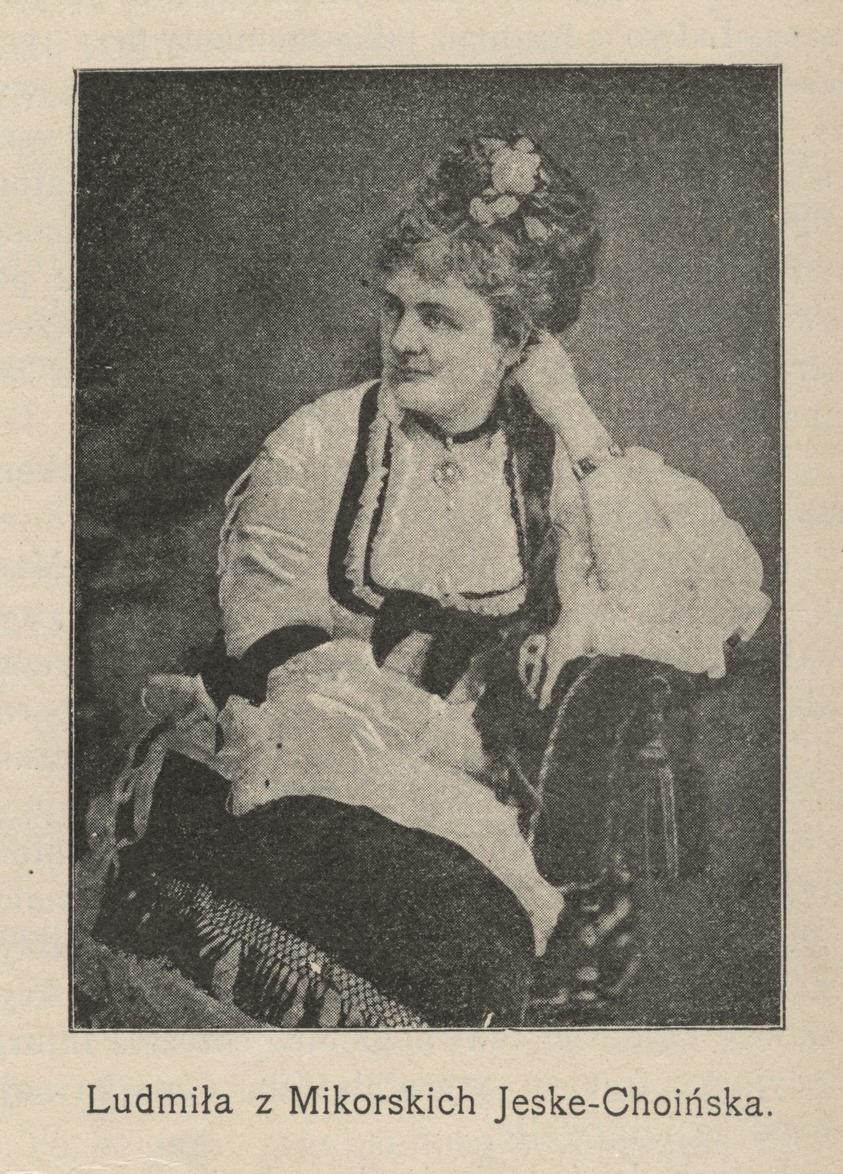

Ludmila Jeske-Choińska-Mikorska (1849 – 2 November 1898) was a Polish singer and composer. She was born in Małachowo, near Poznań, and studied singing in Vienna with Mathilde Marchesi and in Milan with Francesco Lamperti and composition in Warsaw with Gustaw Roguski and Zygmunt Noskowski. She taught in Poznań beginning in 1877, and later in Warsaw. Her symphonic poem Rusalka won an award in Chicago in 1893. She married Teodore Jeske-Choiński and died in Warsaw.

== Works ==
Mikorska wrote for orchestra and theater, and also dances and works for piano. Selected works include:

- Rusalka symphonic poem
- Markiz de Créqui, comic opera, 1892
- Filutka, operetta, 1884
- Zuch dziewczyna, operetta, 1884
