= Rusocin, Greater Poland Voivodeship =

Rusocin
- Village
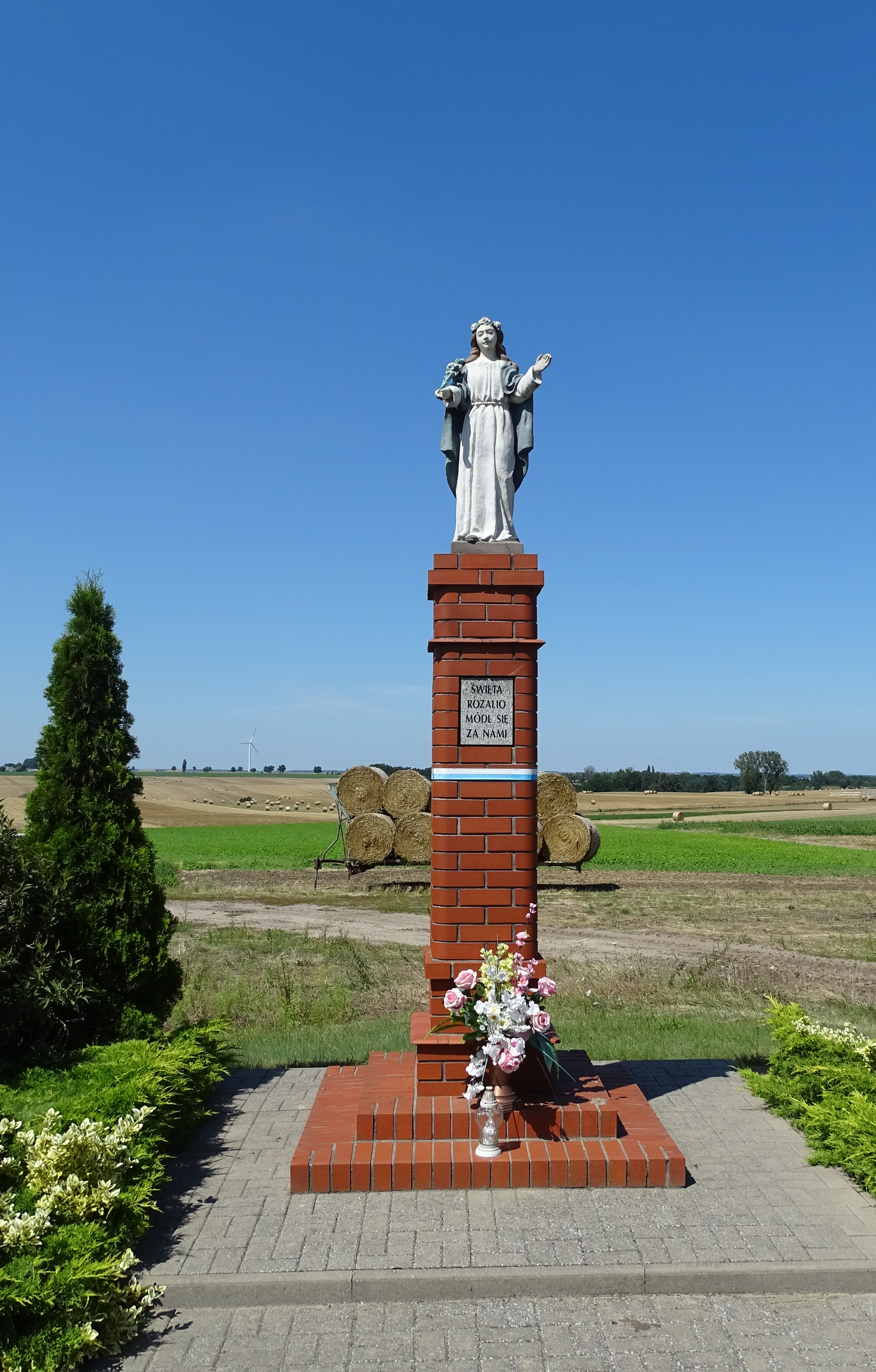
- The roadside shrine.

- Location within Poland
- Coordinates: 52°1′33″N 17°7′46″E
- Country: Poland
- Voivodeship: Greater Poland
- County: Śrem
- Gmina: Dolsk
- Elevation: 90 m (300 ft)
- Population: 300

Rusocin [ruˈsɔt͡ɕin] is a village in the administrative district of Gmina Dolsk, within Śrem County, Greater Poland Voivodeship, in west-central Poland.
