= Pierre-Marie Gault de Saint-Germain =

French painter

Pierre-Marie Gault de Saint-Germain (9 February 1754 – 11 November 1842) was a painter and art historian, inspired by the French enlightenment.

He was born in Paris and studied under Louis Jean-Jacques Durameau. He left a very large number of historical and landscape pictures, miniatures and portraits.

Among his portraits are those of Voltaire, Mademoiselle Clairon, Crébillon, and Stanislaus, King of Poland.

He wrote accounts of the lives and works of Leonardo da Vinci and Nicolas Poussin; a Guide des Amateurs de Tableaux pour les Ecoles allemande, flamande et hollandaise, 1818; and other works relative to painting, in which he displayed much knowledge and judgment.

He was married to the Polish artist, Anna Rajecka. It is not known if they had any children. The Rue Gault de Saint-Germain in Clermont-Ferrand is named after him.
