= Masłowo, Śrem County =

Masłowo
- Village
- Location within Poland
- Coordinates: 52°1′N 17°5′E
- Country: Poland
- Voivodeship: Greater Poland
- County: Śrem
- Gmina: Dolsk
- Population: 270

Masłowo [maˈswɔvɔ] is a village in the administrative district of Gmina Dolsk, within Śrem County, Greater Poland Voivodeship, in west-central Poland.
