= Małachowo, Greater Poland Voivodeship =

Małachowo
- Village
- Location within Poland
- Coordinates: 51°57′N 17°4′E
- Country: Poland
- Voivodeship: Greater Poland
- County: Śrem
- Gmina: Dolsk
- Population: 510

Małachowo [mawaˈxɔvɔ] is a village in the administrative district of Gmina Dolsk, within Śrem County, Greater Poland Voivodeship, in west-central Poland.
