= Gajewo, Śrem County =

Gajewo
- Village
- Location within Poland
- Coordinates: 51°56′43″N 17°6′32″E
- Country: Poland
- Voivodeship: Greater Poland
- County: Śrem
- Gmina: Dolsk
- Elevation: 32 m (105 ft)

Gajewo [ɡaˈjɛvɔ] is a village in the administrative district of Gmina Dolsk, within Śrem County, Greater Poland Voivodeship, in west-central Poland.
