= Dolsk =

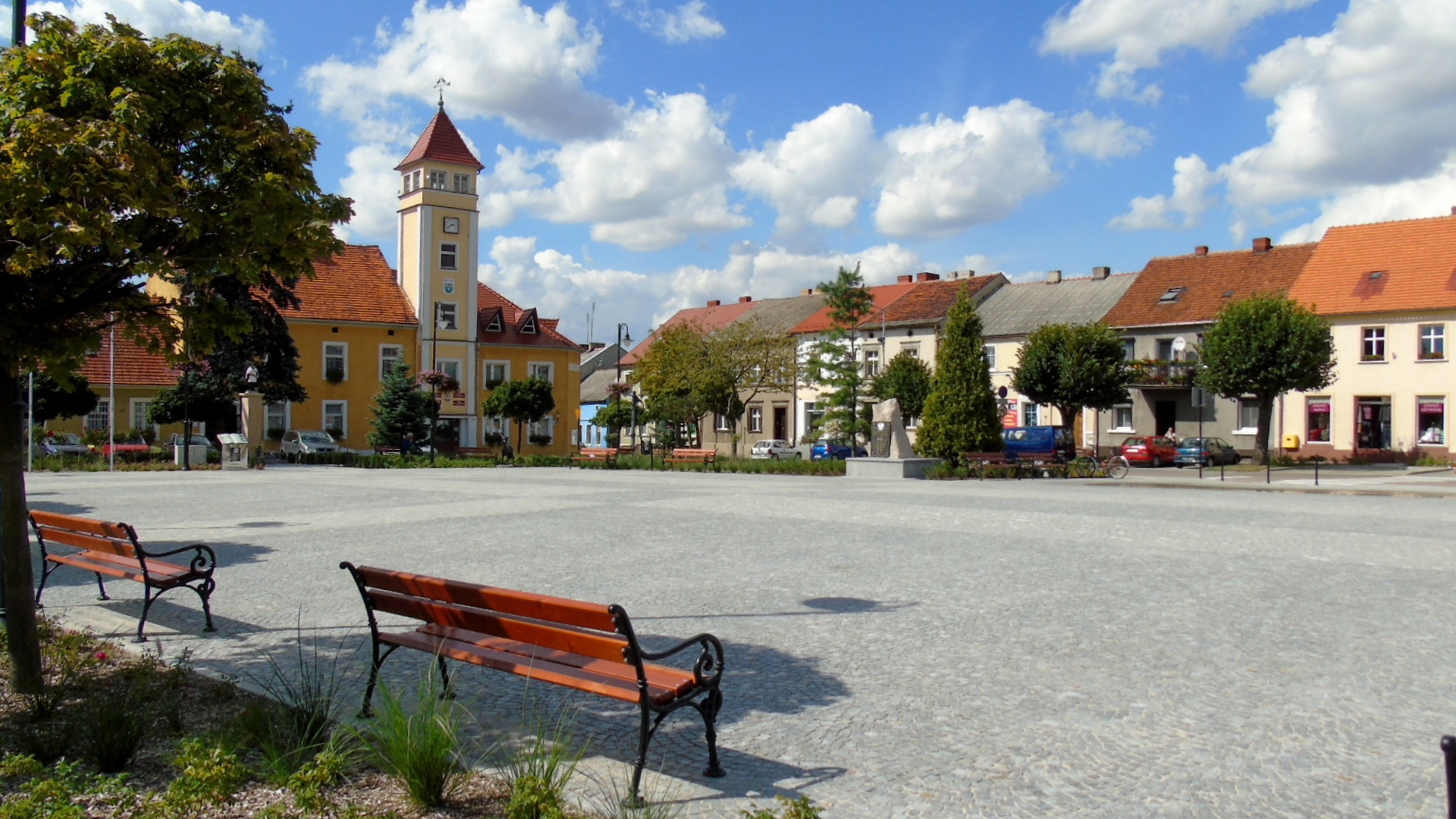
- Market Square

- Coat of arms

- Location within Poland
- Coordinates: 51°58′55″N 17°03′59″E
- Country: Poland
- Voivodeship: Greater Poland
- County: Śrem
- Gmina: Dolsk
- First mentioned: 1136
- Town rights: 1359

Government
  - Mayor: Tomasz Frąckowiak

Area
  - Total: 6.02 km^{2} (2.32 sq mi)

Population (31 December 2021)
  - Total: 1,550
  - Density: 257/km^{2} (667/sq mi)
- Time zone: UTC+1 (CET)
  - Summer (DST): UTC+2 (CEST)
- Postal code: 63-140
- Area code: +48 61
- Car plates: PSE
- Climate: Cfb
- Website: http://dolsk.pl/

Dolsk [dɔlsk] is a town in the Greater Poland Voivodeship in west-central Poland. As of December 2021, the town has a population of 1,550. A capital of Gmina Dolsk within the Śrem County, the town is a minor centre of trade and commerce. The town is located between two lakes, the Dolskie Wielkie and Dolskie Małe, both deriving their names from the name of the town. Geographically, the town lies in the Leszczyńska Uplands in Greater Poland, close to its border with Lower Silesia.

== History ==
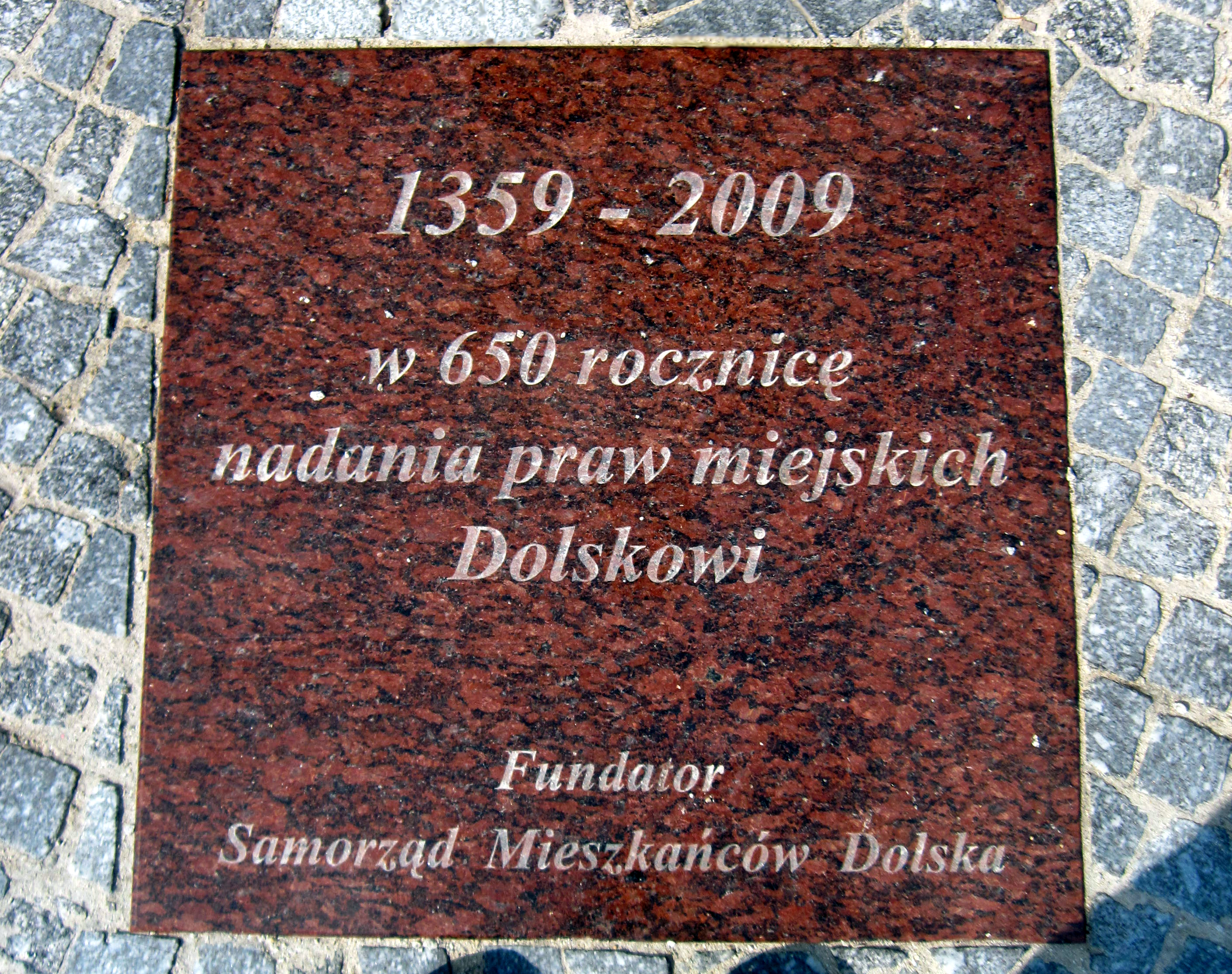
Plaque commemorating the granting of town rights in 1359

The town was first mentioned in one of the first documents written partially in the Polish language, that is the Bull of Gniezno of 1136. Back then it was a private property of the Bishops of Gniezno. In the mid-13th century the town was transferred to the Bishops of Poznań, who remained the sole owners of the area until after the Partitions of Poland. Located at the trade route linking Poznań with Wrocław, the town drew significant income from the traders and merchants, who were obliged to sell their merchandise at the local market before proceeding down the trade route. In 1359 king Casimir III granted the town with Środa law, a local variant of the Magdeburg law.

In 1793 Dolsk was annexed by Prussia in the Second Partition of Poland, and in 1797 it was confiscated by the Prussian authorities and gradually fell into dismay. Following the successful Greater Poland uprising of 1806, it was regained by Poles and included within the short-lived Duchy of Warsaw, and in 1815 it was reannexed by Prussia. In the mid-19th century, four annual fairs were held in the town and the local populace was mainly employed in cloth making, leather making and pottery. The town was restored to Poland, after the country regained independence in 1918 following World War I.

During World War II the town was under German occupation and in the mass executions carried out by the occupiers, 10 people from Dolsk and the surrounding areas were shot. The mayor of Dolsk, Józef Burdajewicz, was murdered in a public execution of 17 Poles, carried out by the German Einsatzgruppe VI on October 20, 1939, in the nearby town of Książ Wielkopolski. The Germans also expelled hundreds of Poles in 1939–1941, and handed over their houses to German colonists as part of the Lebensraum policy. The Polish resistance movement was present in Dolsk. Polish underground press was distributed in the town. Antoni Kaźmierski, founder of the local unit of the Union of Armed Struggle, was arrested by the Gestapo in 1941, and eventually sentenced to death and executed the following year. Liberation from Nazi Germany's occupation took place on January 21, 1945.

== Sights ==
The town is experiencing a period of growth due to increase in tourist traffic. Among the most notable tourist attractions are three local churches: St. Michael's church (circa 1460, burnt and rebuilt in 1790, one of the most notable pieces of late Gothic architecture in the area), Baroque St. Laurentius' church (17th century) and Holy Spirit's church (17th century wooden church, formerly a chapel for the local hospital). The area around the town is a mosaic of various types of landscape, mostly formed during the glacial age. Among the most notable features are dense forests, several lakes and healthy turf deposits.

== Transport ==
Dolsk lies on voivodeship road 434.

The nearest railway station is in Leszno.

== Demographics ==
Historical population

Year	Pop.	±%
1837	1,198	—
1871	1,644	+37.2%
1880	1,616	−1.7%
1890	1,559	−3.5%
1900	1,626	+4.3%
1910	1,704	+4.8%

Year	Pop.	±%
1921	1,558	−8.6%
1931	1,578	+1.3%
1939	1,876	+18.9%
1950	1,436	−23.5%
1960	1,572	+9.5%
2010	1,528	−2.8%

== Gallery ==
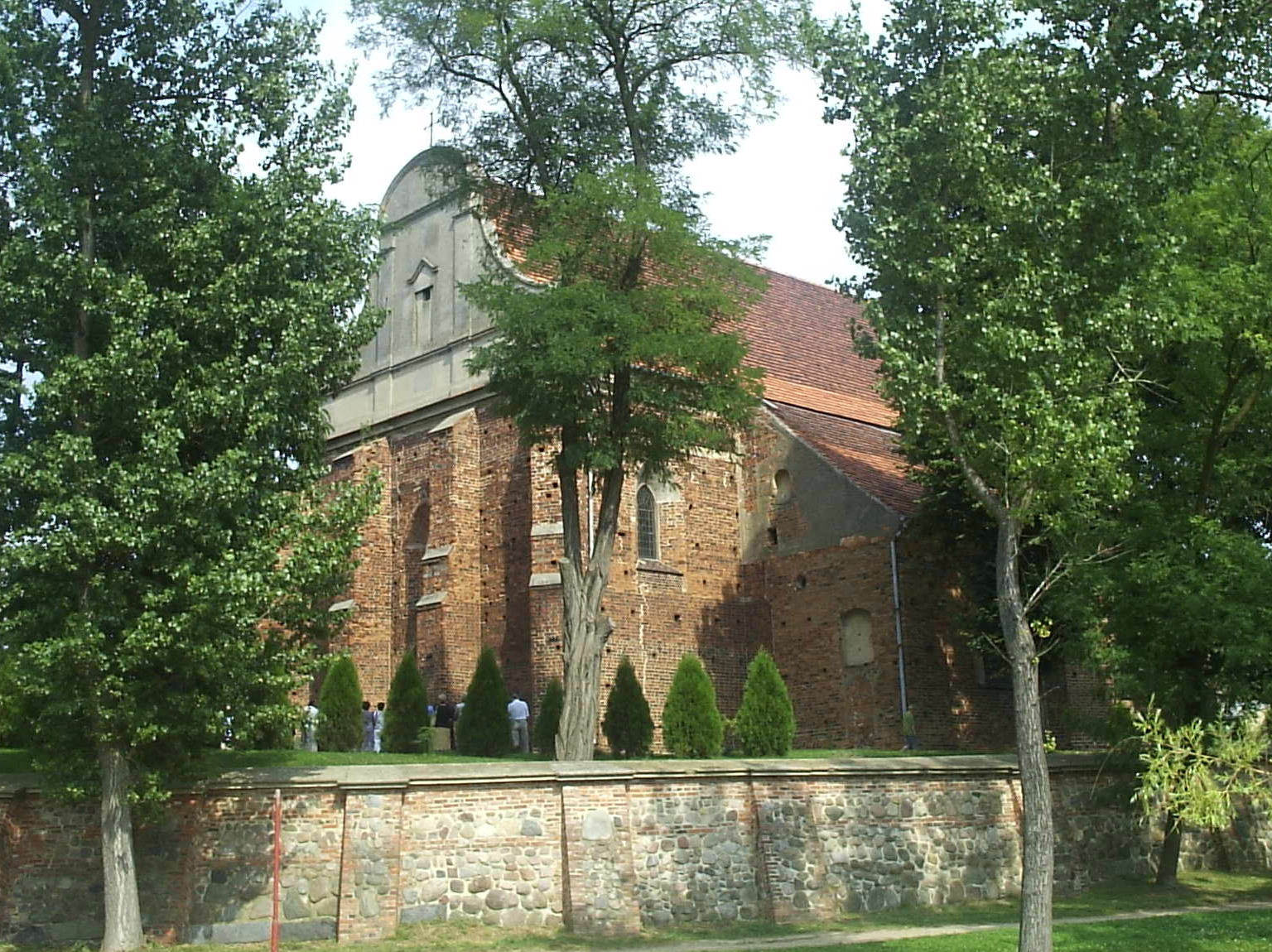
St. Michael's Church

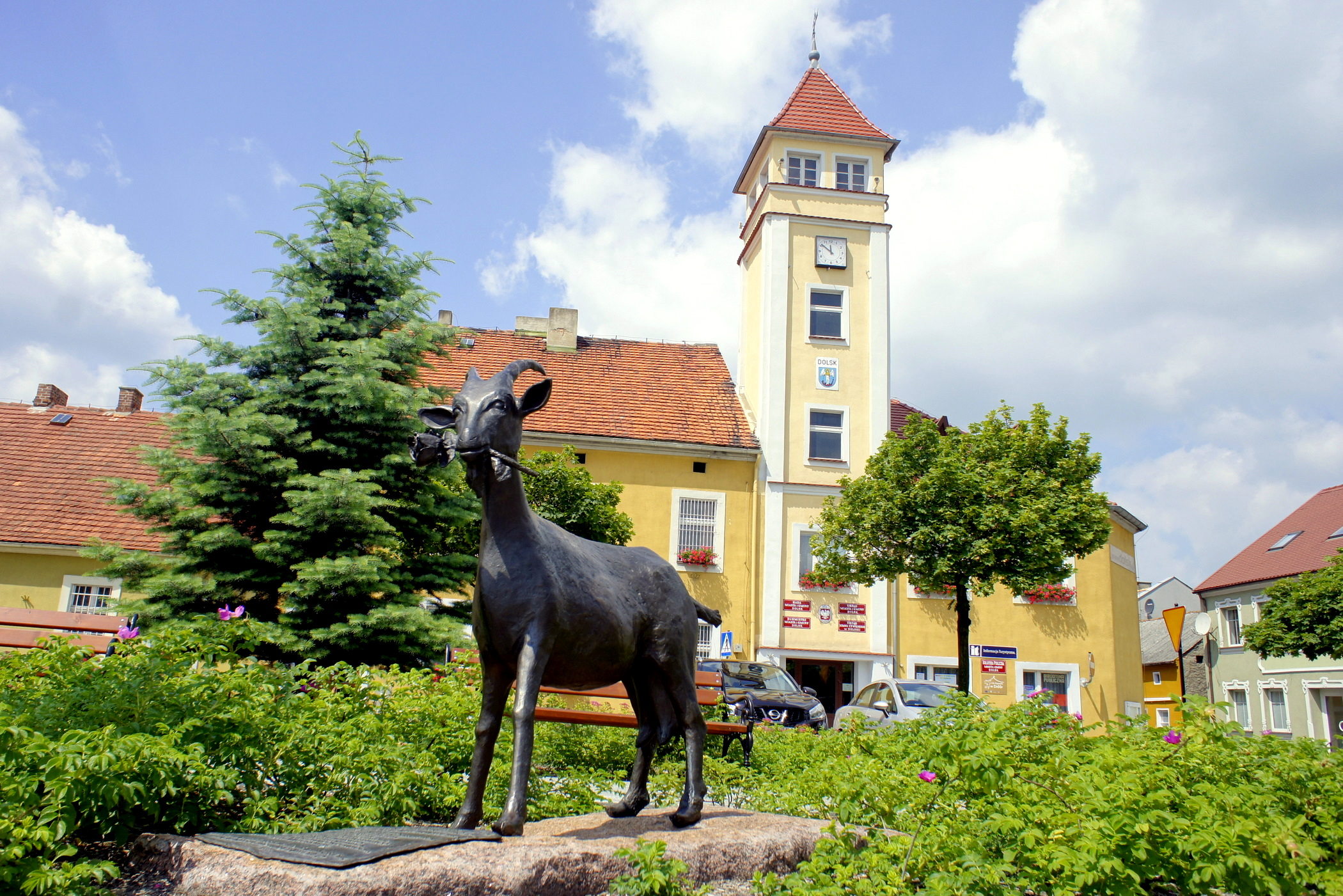
Dolsk Town Hall

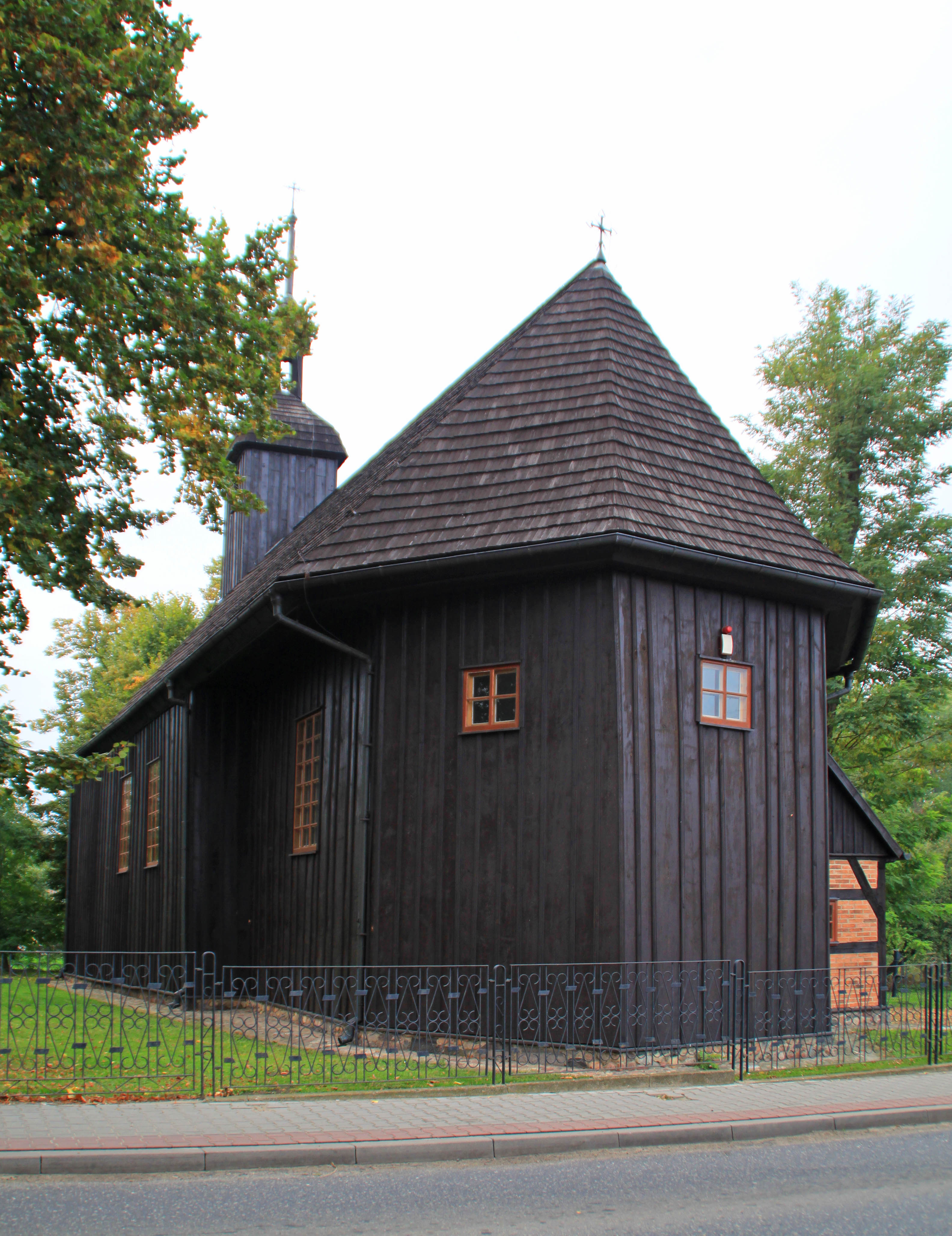
Wooden church of the Holy Spirit

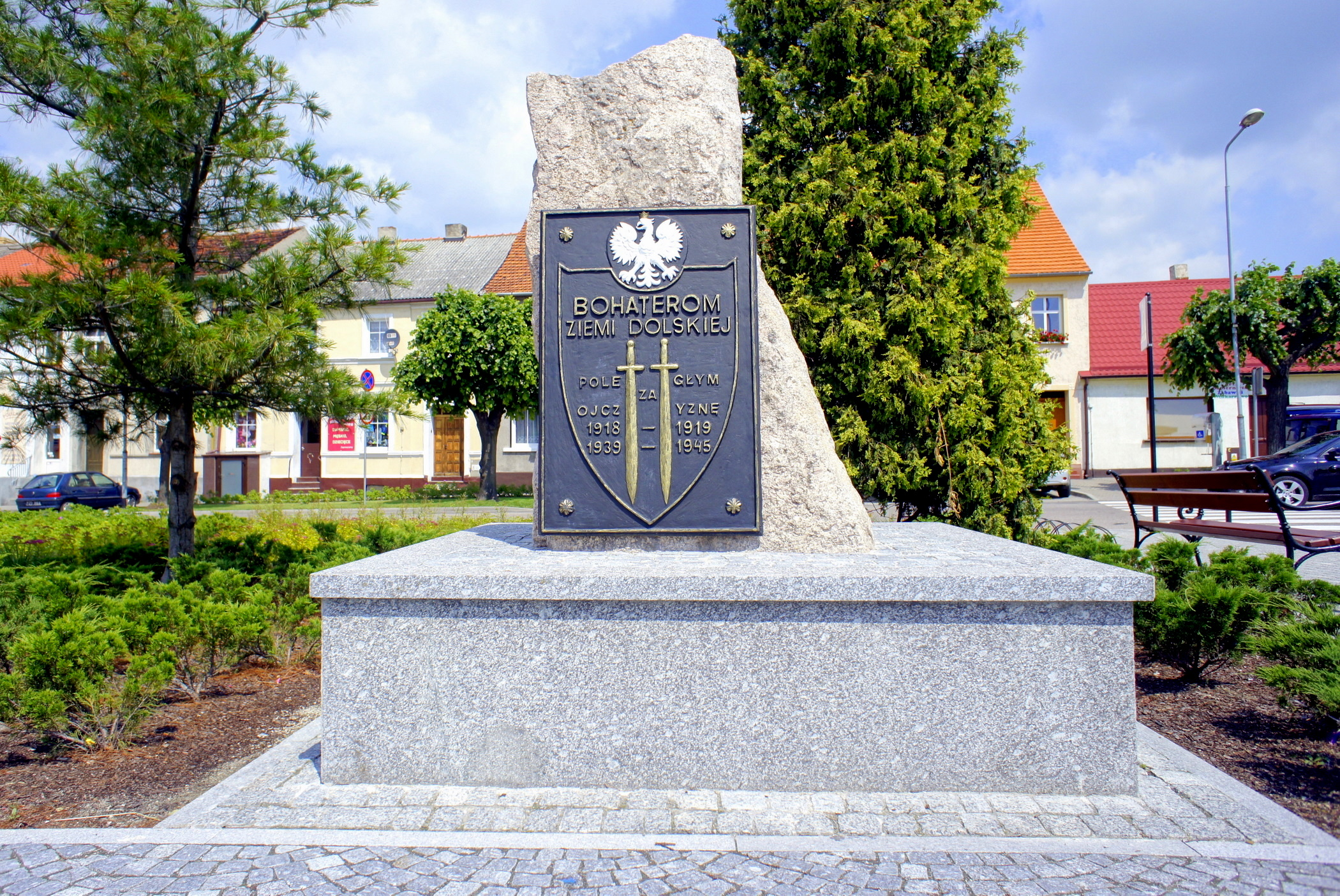
Memorial to the Heroes of Dolsk land, who died for their fatherland in 1918–1919 and 1939–1945
