= Pinka, Greater Poland Voivodeship =

Pinka
- Village
- Location within Poland
- Coordinates: 52°1′14″N 17°2′52″E
- Country: Poland
- Voivodeship: Greater Poland
- County: Śrem
- Gmina: Dolsk
- Elevation: 90 m (300 ft)
- Population: 80

Pinka [ˈpinka] is a village in the administrative district of Gmina Dolsk, within Śrem County, Greater Poland Voivodeship, in west-central Poland.
