= National road 43 (Poland) =

Road in Poland

National Road 43
- Droga krajowa nr 43

Route information
- Maintained by GDDKiA
- Length: 75.5 km (46.9 mi)

Major junctions
- From: Wieluń
- To: Częstochowa

Location
- Country: Poland
- Regions: Łódź Voivodeship, Opole Voivodeship, Silesian Voivodeship
- Major cities: Wieluń, Krzepice, Kłobuck, Częstochowa

Highway system
- National roads in Poland; Voivodeship roads
← DK 42	→ DK 44

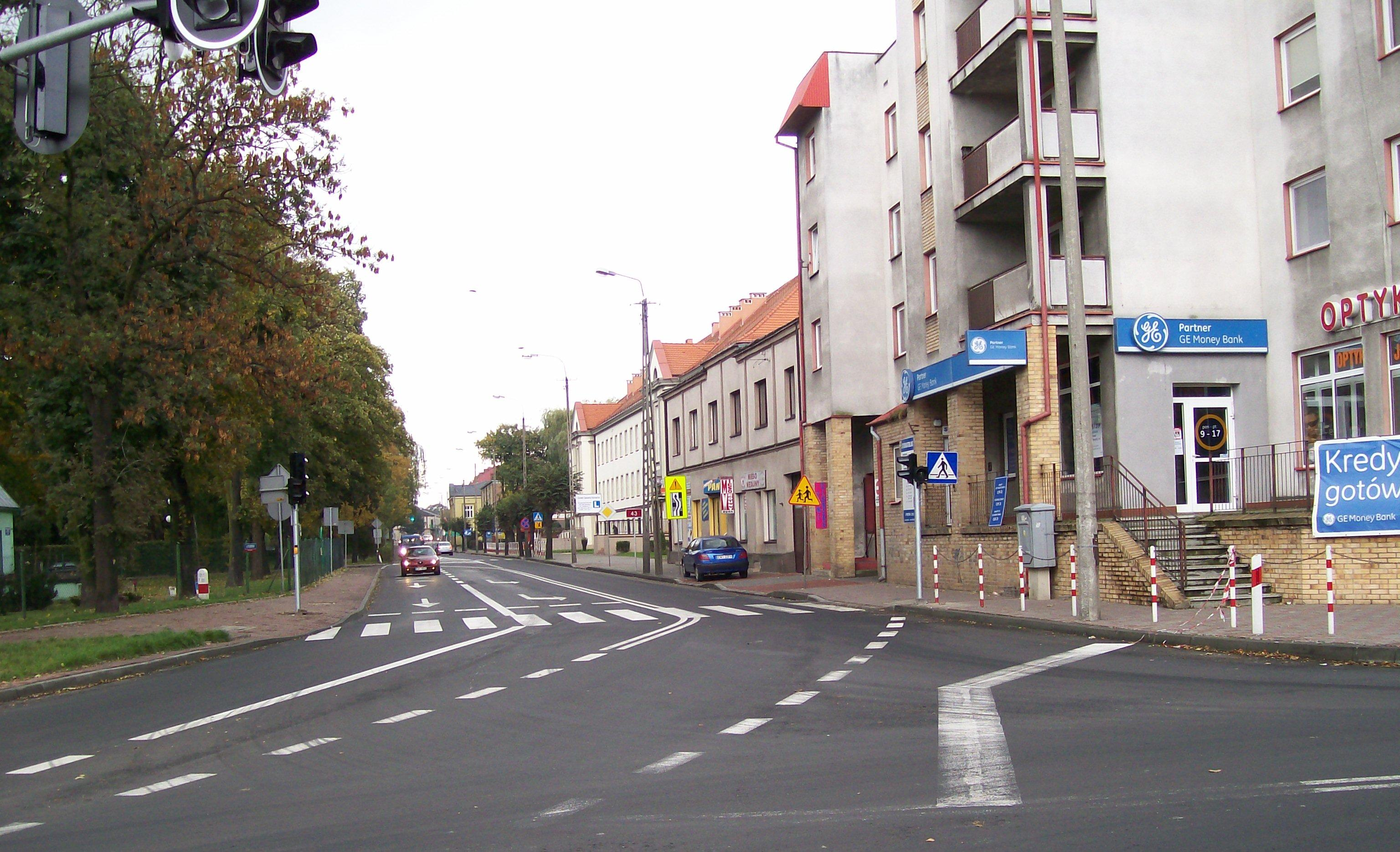
National road 43 in Wieluń

National road 43 is a national road in Poland. It runs through Lódź, Opole and Silesian, and is 75.5 km (46.9 mi) in length. The highway connects Wieluń with Częstochowa. The road runs concurrent with national road 42 between Rudniki and Jaworzno for approximately 4 km, and has a short concurrency with national road 46 in Częstochowa.

== Current status ==
The condition of roads is the worst in the Opole voivodeship on the stretch from the roundabout at Jaworzno to the border with the Silesian voivodeship in Julianpol (non-normative approximately 6 meters in width and rut) - Episode provided for reconstruction in 2011. GDDKiA branch in Katowice plans to rehabilitate the road between Kłobuck and Krzepice and, in places, and Opatów & Waleńczów - created such as: pedestrian-bicycle, separate lanes for turning left, will be strengthened construction of the road.

Łódź branch of GDDKiA planned reconstruction of the road in the Lódź voivodeship. This segment consists of Wieluń's streets and a fragment of Piłsudski Street. For this purpose, two announced a tender for the reconstruction of the documentation. None of the auctions have failed to resolve, and therefore it was decided only on the renewal of this road section. Renewal of the road was conducted in August 2009.

== Former route ==
Before 2000, road 43 ran from Pleszew to Bytom. This is now part of road 11.

== Major towns located on route 43 ==
- Wieluń (road No. 45) - NS bypass (planned)
- Rudniki (road No. 42)
- Krzepice - bypass (road)
- Kłobuck - bypass (road) (planned)
- Częstochowa (route No 1, road no 46)
