= Paul-Heinrich Dähne =

German World War II fighter pilot (1921–1945)

- Born: 7 July 1921; Frankfurt (Oder), Germany
- Died: 24 April 1945 (aged 23); Warnemünde, Nazi Germany
- Military career
- Allegiance: Nazi Germany
- Branch: Luftwaffe
- Rank: Hauptmann (Captain)
- Nickname: Sarotti
- Units: JG 52, JG 11, JG 1
- Commands: 2./JG 52, III./JG 11, II./JG 1
- Conflicts: World War II: Battle of the Caucasus; Battle of Kursk; Defense of the Reich; Operation Bodenplatte
- Awards: Knight's Cross of the Iron Cross

Paul-Heinrich Dähne (7 July 1921 – 24 April 1945) was a German Luftwaffe military aviator during World War II, a fighter ace credited with 100 aerial victories—that is, 100 aerial combat encounters resulting in the destruction of the enemy aircraft—claimed in about 600 combat missions.

Born in Frankfurt an der Oder, Dähne was trained as a fighter pilot and was posted to Jagdgeschwader 52 (JG 52—52nd Fighter Wing) in late 1940. Fighting on the English Channel, he claimed his first aerial victory on 26 August 1941 over a Royal Air Force (RAF) Bristol Blenheim bomber. His unit was then posted to the Eastern Front where his number of aerial victories increased to 90. Dähne was awarded the Knight's Cross of the Iron Cross on 6 April 1944. He was then transferred to the Western Front where he fought in Defense of the Reich. There he was appointed Gruppenkommandeur (group commander) of III. Gruppe (3rd group) of Jagdgeschwader 11 (JG 11—11th Fighter Wing) and later of II. Gruppe of JG 11. Dähne was killed in a flight accident while training on the Heinkel He 162 jet fighter near Warnemünde, Germany on 24 April 1945.

== Career ==
Dähne was 7 July 1921 in Frankfurt an der Oder, at the time in the Province of Brandenburg in the German Empire. Following flight training as a fighter pilot, (Note: Flight training in the Luftwaffe progressed through the levels A1, A2 and B1, B2, referred to as A/B flight training. A training included theoretical and practical training in aerobatics, navigation, long-distance flights and dead-stick landings. The B courses included high-altitude flights, instrument flights, night landings and training to handle the aircraft in difficult situations.) he was posted to the 2. Staffel (2nd squadron) of Jagdgeschwader 52 (JG 52—52nd Fighter Wing), a squadron of I. Gruppe (1st group) of JG 52, in late 1940. At the time, 2. Staffel was commanded by Oberleutnant Karl-Heinz Leesmann and I. Gruppe was led by Hauptmann Wolfgang Ewald. Dähne was nicknamed "Sarotti", referring to the German chocolate brand Sarotti, by his comrades for his dark taint and his love of chocolate. He had joined the Gruppe following its withdrawal from the English Channel while it was based at Krefeld Airfield for a period of rest and replenishment. On 26 December, I. Gruppe relocated to an airfield at Katwijk where it was tasked with patrolling the Dutch coast area and German Bight. On 21 February 1941, the three Staffeln were deployed at various airfields on the Dutch, German and Danish North Sea coast.

On 24 May, Ewald was transferred and in consequence Leesmann was given command I. Gruppe while Oberleutnant Robert Göbel then headed 2. Staffel. On 7 July, 2. Staffel moved to Langeoog, staying on the island until 31 August. While based at Langeoog, Dähne claimed his first aerial victory on 26 August when he shot down a Royal Air Force (RAF) Bristol Blenheim bomber north of Juist. On 23 September, I. Gruppe was withdrawn from the Western Front and was sent to the Eastern Front where it would be based at an airfield at Ponyatovka, located approximately 30 kilometers (19 miles) southwest of Roslavl.

=== The war against the Soviet Union ===
On 22 June, German forces launched Operation Barbarossa, the invasion of the Soviet Union. Pror to its deployment on the Eastern Front, I. Gruppe was fully equipped with the Messerschmitt Bf 109 F-2. The Gruppe reached Orsha on 27 September before heading to Ponyatovka on 2 October. There, the Gruppe was initially subordinated to the Stab (headquarters unit) of Jagdgeschwader 27 (JG 27—27th Fighter Wing) and supported German forces fighting in the Battle of Vyazma as part of Operation Typhoon, the code name of the German offensive on Moscow. Here, Dähne claimed his first aerial victory on the Eastern Front on 18 October when he shot down an Ilyushin DB-3 bomber. On 20 October, the Gruppe moved to an airfield named Kalinin-Southwest, present-day Tver, and located on the Volga, and to Staritsa on 31 October and then to Ruza located approximately 80 kilometers (50 miles) west of Moscow, on 3 November. Here, Dähne claimed a Polikarpov R-5 reconnaissance bomber on 18 November. The failed assault on Moscow forced I. Gruppe to retreat to an airfield at Dugino, present-day Novodugino, on 15 December where they stayed until 31 January 1942. Here on 20 January, he claimed two I-61 fighters, an early German designation for the Mikoyan-Gurevich MiG-3.

I./JG 52 insignia

On 1 February 1942, I. Gruppe was withdrawn from combat operations and was moved to Smolensk and then further west to Orsha. From 8 to 12 February the Gruppe took a train to Jesau near Königsberg, present-day Kaliningrad in Russia, for a period of recuperation and replenishment where they received new Bf 109 F-4 aircraft. The Gruppe was ordered to Olmütz, present-day Olomouc in the Czech Republic on 11 April. On 17 May, I. Gruppe relocated to Artyomovsk, present-day Bakhmut. From Artyomovsk, JG 52 supported the German forces fighting in the Second Battle of Kharkov. On 24 May, the Gruppe was ordered to relocate to Barvinkove located approximately 40 kilometers (25 miles) west of Sloviansk. On 1 June, the Gruppe then moved to an airfield at Grakowo, located approximately halfway between Kharkov and Kupiansk.

In June 1942, command positions in I. Gruppe changed. On 13 June, Leesmann was transferred passing command of the Gruppe to Hauptmann Helmut Bennemann. When Göbel, the commander of 2. Staffel, was killed in action on 25 June, command was briefly given to Leutnant Karl Rung until Hauptmann Johannes Wiese took command two days later.

On 10 February 1943, I. Gruppe moved to Poltava where they stayed until 10 March. When on 10 May, Bennemann was severely wounded by the explosion of an incendiary bomb at Charkow-Woitschenko Airfield, Wiese was tasked with leading I. Gruppe. At first, Wiese commanded both 2. Staffel and I. Gruppe until on 1 July, Dähne was given temporary leadership of the Staffel.

In preparation for Operation Citadel, I. Gruppe was moved to Bessonovka, a makeshift airfield located approximately 20 kilometers (12 miles) west of Belgorod on 4 July. Three days later, an aerial victory claimed by Dähne was counted as the 800th aerial victory by I. Gruppe and the 6,000th of JG 52 overall. By 5 October, the injuries sustained by Bennemann on 10 May proved so severe that Wiese was officially given command of the Gruppe. Dähne was officially appointed Staffelkapitän (squadron leader) of 2. Staffel of JG 52 on 13 November 1943. On 6 April 1944, Dähne was awarded the Knight's Cross of the Iron Cross (Ritterkreuz des Eisernen Kreuzes).

=== Defense of the Reich ===
In early June 1944, 2. Staffel was withdrawn from the Eastern Front and transferred west to fight in Defense of the Reich. The Staffel was subordinated to III. Gruppe of Jagdgeschwader 11 (JG 11—11th Fighter Wing) led by Hauptmann Horst-Günther von Fassong. There, the Staffel was then redesignated and became the 12. Staffel of JG 11. When on 22 June Soviet forces launched Operation Bagration, III. Gruppe was ordered to relocate to the Eastern Front where it was to be deployed in the combat area of Minsk and fought in the Minsk Offensive. The Gruppe flew its last combat missions on the Eastern Front on 1 September. During its ten-week tenure in the east, III. Gruppe pilots claimed approximately 125 aerial victories, including six by Dähne, for the loss of twelve pilots killed or missing and a further eleven injured or wounded in combat. The Gruppe then moved to an airfield at Riesa-Leutewitz for a brief period of rest and replenishment.

On 17 September 1944 Allied forces launched Operation Market Garden, the operation to cross the Rhine at Arnhem. The following day, III. Gruppe was ordered to Achmer Airfiled to support the German defense. On 25 September, during Operation Berlin, the evacuation of the remnants of the British 1st Airborne Division, Dähne claimed a Republic P-47 Thunderbolt fighter shot down. Two days later, III. Gruppe flew a combat air patrol to the area of Arnhem-Nijmegen area where Dähne claimed an aerial victory over a Supermarine Spitfire fighter.

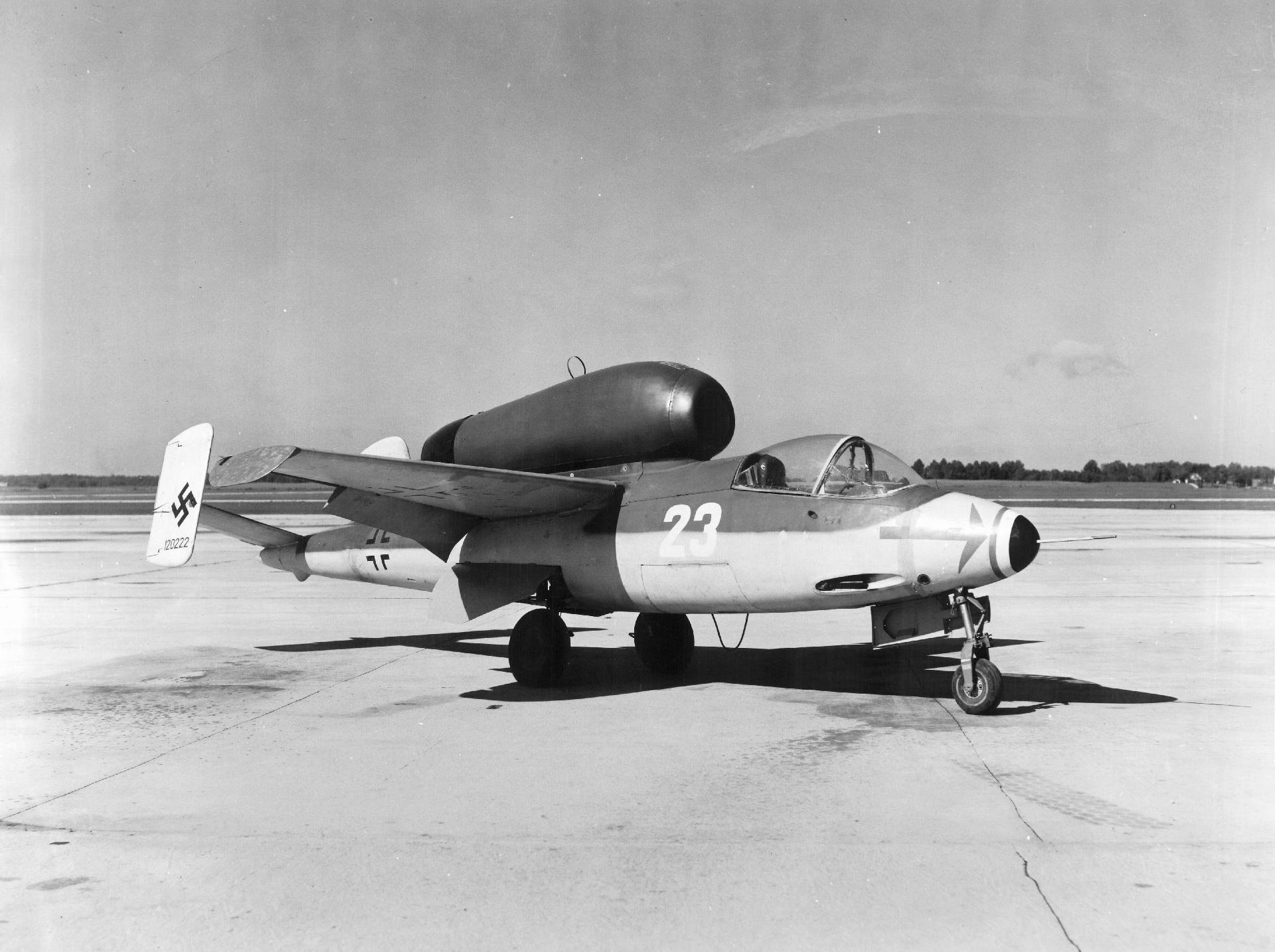
A He 162 similar to that flown by Dähne

In preparation for Operation Bodenplatte, III. Gruppe was moved to an airfield at Großostheim, near Aschaffenburg on 17 December 1944. Fassong had learned of the planned operation on 5 December at a meeting held at the headquarters of the II. Jagdkorps (2nd Fighter Corps) commanded by Generalmajor Dietrich Peltz, on 5 December. Fassong informed his Staffelkapitäne of the upcoming operation on 15 December without going into the specifics of the target and date. On 24 December, during the Battle of the Bulge, Dähne shot down a Lockheed P-38 Lightning of the Ninth Air Force near Trier.

Operation Bodenplatte was launched on 1 January. At 06:30, Fassong briefed his pilots of the operation and that their target would be the Asch Airfield (Designated: Y-29) located north-west of Maastricht. At 08:18, Fassong led a flight of 31 Focke-Wulf Fw 190 A-8 fighter aircraft to Frankfurt where they were joined by other Luftwaffe fighters. On this mission, Fassong was killed in action and Dähne was shot down in his Fw 190 and bailed out over German held territory. In consequence, Dähne succeeded Fassong as Gruppenkommandeur (group commander) of III. Gruppe while Leutnant Günter Metzner was given command of 12. Staffel.

In March 1945, Dähne succeeded Oberleutnant Fritz Wegener as commander of II. Gruppe of Jagdgeschwader 1 "Oesau" (JG 1—1st Fighter Wing). Wegener had temporarily led the Gruppe after its former commander, Hauptmann Hermann Staiger, was transferred in January. The Gruppe was based at Garz Airfield located near Garz. On 26 March, Dähne received orders to relocate II. Gruppe to Wien-Schwechat Airfield for conversion training to the Heinkel He 162 jet fighter. The order was later changed and II. Gruppe was ordered to Rostock-Marienehe for conversion training. Dähne was killed in a training flight accident of the He 162 near Warnemünde, Germany on 24 April 1945 shortly after 16:00. Flying at an altitude of 500 meters (1,600 feet) Dähne had attempted a turn when his aircraft began skidding. The aircraft lost height rapidly and crashed into the Warnow. It was assumed that Dähne had deployed the ejection seat while the aircraft canopy failed to release, smashing his skull.

== Summary of career ==
=== Aerial victory claims ===
According to US historian David T. Zabecki, Dähne was credited with 100 aerial victories. Spick lists him with approximately 100 aerial victories claimed in about 600 combat missions, with 80 claims on the Eastern Front and 20 on the Western Front, and a mission-to-claim ratio of 6.00. Mathews and Foreman, authors of Luftwaffe Aces — Biographies and Victory Claims, researched the German Federal Archives and indicate that Dähne had more than 99 aerial victory claims. This figure includes at least 97 aerial victories on the Eastern Front and two over the Western Allies. According to the authors, the actual number of aerial victories may be as high as 128 claims.

Victory claims were logged to a map-reference (PQ = Planquadrat), for example "PQ 4758". The Luftwaffe grid map (Jägermeldenetz) covered all of Europe, western Russia and North Africa and was composed of rectangles measuring 15 minutes of latitude by 30 minutes of longitude, an area of about 360 square miles (930 km^{2}). These sectors were then subdivided into 36 smaller units to give a location area 3 km × 4 km (1.9 mi × 2.5 mi) in size.

Chronicle of aerial victories
This and the ♠ (Ace of spades) indicates those aerial victories which made Dähne an "ace-in-a-day", a term which designates a fighter pilot who has shot down five or more airplanes in a single day. This and the ? (question mark) indicates information discrepancies listed by Prien, Stemmer, Rodeike, Bock, Mathews and Foreman.
Claim	Date	Time	Type	Location	Claim	Date	Time	Type	Location
– Claims with 2. Staffel of Jagdgeschwader 52 – On the Western Front — 27 December 1940 – 23 September 1941
1	26 August 1941	14:15	Blenheim	north of Juist					
– Claims with 2. Staffel of Jagdgeschwader 52 – Operation Barbarossa — 2 October – 5 December 1941
2	18 October 1941	13:22	DB-3		3	18 November 1941	09:25	R-5	
– Claims with 2. Staffel of Jagdgeschwader 52 – Eastern Front — 6 December 1941 – 5 February 1942
4	20 January 1942	10:45	I-61 (MiG-3)		5? (Note: This claim is not listed by Mathews and Foreman.)	20 January 1942	10:45	I-61 (MiG-3)	PQ 4758, Staritsa
– Claims with 2. Staffel of Jagdgeschwader 52 – Eastern Front — 19 May 1942 – 3 February 1943
6	10 June 1942	13:25	Il-2		12	4 August 1942	05:21	LaGG-3	PQ 66652 vicinity of Malikut
7	10 June 1942	18:35	Il-2		13	19 August 1942	12:23	LaGG-3	PQ 54161 vicinity of Duminichi
8	22 June 1942	18:20	Il-2		14	22 August 1942	14:25	Yak-1	PQ 54252 vicinity of Uljanowo
9	1 July 1942	17:00	I-180 (Yak-7)		15	22 August 1942	14:35	Il-2	PQ 54283 vicinity of Uljanowo
10	5 July 1942	13:05	Boston		16	22 August 1942	14:37	Il-2	PQ 54283 vicinity of Uljanowo
11	4 August 1942	05:20	LaGG-3	PQ 66651 vicinity of Chushka Spit					
– Claims with 2. Staffel of Jagdgeschwader 52 – Eastern Front — 19 May 1942 – 3 February 1943
17	5 February 1943	12:20	Il-2	PQ 35 Ost 81744; 10 km (6.2 mi) northwest of Urazovo	46	21 September 1943	16:34	Il-2 m.H. (Note: The "m.H." refers to an Ilyushin Il-2 with rear gunner (mit Heckschütze).)	PQ 34 Ost 66852 vicinity of Artjuschenko
18	7 May 1943	18:35	Il-2 m.H.	PQ 35 Ost 6162, 40 km (25 mi) northeast of Kharkov west of Memel	47	24 September 1943	10:00	Yak-1	PQ 34 Ost 66891; Black Sea, south of Wennlowka
19	31 May 1943	04:19	Yak-1	PQ 34 Ost 75231 northwest of Krymsk	48	25 September 1943	12:52	P-39	PQ 34 Ost 65221; Black Sea, southeast of Cape Takyl
20	2 June 1943	13:32	P-39	PQ 34 Ost 75233, 1 km (0.62 mi) east of Moldawanskoje west of Krymsk	49	26 September 1943	14:35	Yak-9	PQ 34 Ost 77854; Sea of Azov
21	3 June 1943	18:15	La-5	PQ 34 Ost 76864, 7 km (4.3 mi) northeast of Kijewskoje north of Kessjetowa	50	4 October 1943	12:16	Il-2 m.H.	PQ 34 Ost 66652; Lake, east of Kerch
22	5 July 1943	03:30	Il-2	PQ 35 Ost 61621; 20 km (12 mi) southeast of Belgorod	51	4 October 1943	12:18	Il-2 m.H.	PQ 34 Ost 66682 vicinity of Cape Tarkhankut
23	5 July 1943	03:36	Yak-1	PQ 35 Ost 61451, 8 km (5.0 mi) east-northeast of Belgorod; 15 km (9.3 mi) northeast of Belgorod	52	8 October 1943	08:25	Yak-9	PQ 34 Ost 66624 vicinity of Illichivsk
24	5 July 1943	10:10	La-5	PQ 35 Ost 61472, southeast of Belgorod; 5 km (3.1 mi) south of Belgorod	53	8 October 1943	15:16? (Note: According to Mathews and Foreman claimed at 15:15.)	Yak-9	PQ 34 Ost 66661, 1 km (0.62 mi) north of Saporoshkaja; Lake, west of Saporoshskaja
25	5 July 1943	10:25	Il-2	PQ 35 Ost 61192, 30 km (19 mi) north-northwest of Belgorod; 10 km (6.2 mi) east of Krasny Liman	54	14 October 1943	06:50	La-5	PQ 34 Ost 58143 northwest of Zaporizhzhia
26	6 July 1943	06:13	Il-2	PQ 35 Ost 61392; 10 km (6.2 mi) southwest of Belgorod	55	16 October 1943	12:30	P-39	PQ 34 Ost 39282; 30 km (19 mi) east-northeast of Mironowka
27	7 July 1943	13:20	La-5	PQ 35 Ost 61213 southwest of Prokhorovka	56	16 October 1943	14:55	Yak-9	PQ 34 Ost 39284; 30 km (19 mi) east-northeast of Mironowka
28	14 July 1943	16:12	Yak-1	PQ 35 Ost 61111 west of Bogatoye	57	20 October 1943	10:19	Il-2 m.H.	PQ 34 Ost 48291; 20 km (12 mi) west of Zaporizhzhia
29	31 July 1943	16:50	Yak-1	PQ 34 Ost 88252, 3 km (1.9 mi) south of Stepanovka; 25 km (16 mi) east-northeast of Kuteinykove	58	20 October 1943	14:55	Il-2 m.H.	PQ 34 Ost 58354; 20 km (12 mi) south-southeast of Zaporizhzhia
30	31 July 1943	16:55	Il-2	PQ 34 Ost 88252, 5 km (3.1 mi) southwest of Stepanovka; 5 km (3.1 mi) east-northeast of Kuteinykove	59	21 October 1943	07:38	P-39	PQ 34 Ost 39683; 20 km (12 mi) south-southeast of Pjatichatki
? (Note: This claim is not listed by Prien, Stemmer, Rodeike and Bock.)	3 August 1943	17:10	Yak-1	vicinity of Stepanovka	60	21 October 1943	07:48	P-39	PQ 34 Ost 39643; 10 km (6.2 mi) south of Pjatichatki
31	4 August 1943	16:20	Yak-1	PQ 35 Ost 61342; 25 km (16 mi) west of Tomarovka	61	22 October 1943	14:58	Il-2 m.H.	PQ 34 Ost 58384; 25 km (16 mi) south of Zaporizhzhia
32	10 August 1943	11:15	Il-2 m.H.	PQ 35 Ost 61792; 15 km (9.3 mi) northeast of Kharkov	62	23 October 1943	12:10	Il-2 m.H.	PQ 34 Ost 59742; 25 km (16 mi) north of Zaporizhzhia
33	17 August 1943	10:40	Yak-1	PQ 34 Ost 79252; 15 km (9.3 mi) northeast of Slavansk	63	23 October 1943	14:50	Il-2 m.H.	PQ 34 Ost 58383; 30 km (19 mi) south of Zaporizhzhia
34	18 August 1943	13:32	P-39	PQ 34 Ost 88253, north of Kalinowka vicinity of Stepanovka	64	24 October 1943	08:58	P-39	PQ 34 Ost 39831; 5 km (3.1 mi) north of Perekop
35	20 August 1943	05:33	Yak-1	PQ 34 Ost 88225 west of Stepanovka	65	28 October 1943	08:03	Yak-9	PQ 34 Ost 47154; 30 km (19 mi) northwest of Ivanovka
36	20 August 1943	12:50	Yak-1	PQ 34 Ost 98355; 45 km (28 mi) north of Sinjawka	66	29 October 1943	07:15	Yak-9	PQ 34 Ost 47294; 25 km (16 mi) east-northeast of Ivanovka
37	20 August 1943	15:13	Il-2	PQ 34 Ost 88237; 30 km (19 mi) west-southwest of Rovenki	67	1 November 1943	10:18	Il-2 m.H.	PQ 34 Ost 66831 vicinity of Wassjurinskij
38	20 August 1943	17:34	Il-2 m.H.	PQ 34 Ost 88255, 3 km (1.9 mi) west of Kalinowka vicinity of Kalinowka	68♠	2 November 1943	13:35? (Note: According to Mathews and Foreman claimed at 13:25.)	Yak-1	PQ 34 Ost 46141; 25 km (16 mi) northwest of Dzhankoi
39	21 August 1943	10:35? (Note: According to Mathews and Foreman claimed at 10:55.)	Yak-1	PQ 34 Ost 88228 vicinity of Stepanovka	69♠	2 November 1943	13:38? (Note: According to Mathews and Foreman claimed at 13:32.)	Il-2 m.H.	PQ 34 Ost 47742 vicinity of Karankut
40	21 August 1943	16:35	Yak-1	PQ 34 Ost 88252, southwest of Stepanovka; 25 km (16 mi) east-northeast of Kuteinykove	70♠	2 November 1943	13:40	Il-2 m.H.	PQ 34 Ost 47742; 30 km (19 mi) northwest of Dornburg
41	22 August 1943	05:42	Il-2	PQ 35 Ost 70788; 20 km (12 mi) southwest of Izium	71♠	2 November 1943	15:05	Il-2 m.H.	PQ 34 Ost 46154 west of Michailowka
42	22 August 1943	14:35	Yak-1	PQ 35 Ost 70754; 10 km (6.2 mi) south of Izium	72♠	2 November 1943	15:15	Il-2 m.H.	PQ 34 Ost 46172; 25 km (16 mi) west-northwest of Dzhankoi
43	5 September 1943	16:20	P-39	PQ 34 Ost 79392; 25 km (16 mi) west of Konstantinovka	73	11 December 1943	10:53	P-39	northeast of Fedwar
44	5 September 1943	16:23	P-39	PQ 34 Ost 79394; 25 km (16 mi) west of Konstantinovka	74	15 December 1943	10:53? (Note: According to Mathews and Foreman claimed at 14:48.)	P-39	PQ 34 Ost 29651, 3 km (1.9 mi) north of Nowgorodka
45	11 September 1943	07:05	Il-2	PQ 35 Ost 31651; 45 km (28 mi) north-northeast of Mirgorod					
– Claims with 2. Staffel of Jagdgeschwader 52 – Eastern Front — 31 January – May 1944
75	10 March 1944	15:03	P-39	Igard	83	17 April 1944	14:55	P-39	vicinity of Pervomaisk
76	10 March 1944	15:07	P-39	40 km (25 mi) southwest of Nikolayev	84	18 April 1944	17:55	P-39	vicinity of Pervomaisk
77	10 March 1944	15:12	P-39	40 km (25 mi) southwest of Nikolayev	85	25 April 1944	16:32	La-5	north of Balaklava
78	20 March 1944	10:05	R-5	20 km (12 mi) east-southeast of Nowy Bugaj	86	1 May 1944	18:04	Il-2	15 km (9.3 mi) northwest of Iași
79	24 March 1944	13:49	Il-2	25 km (16 mi) north-northeast of Wossnesensk	87	3 May 1944	08:47	P-39	15 km (9.3 mi) northwest of Iași
80	30 March 1944	14:50	Yak-9	20 km (12 mi) south-southwest of Botoșani	88	3 May 1944	17:13	P-39	25 km (16 mi) west-southwest of Tudora
81	17 April 1944	07:50	U-2	25 km (16 mi) south of Balta	89	12 May 1944	17:47	Il-2	15 km (9.3 mi) southeast of Grigoriopol
82	17 April 1944	12:10	P-39	45 km (28 mi) northeast of Botoșani	90	14 May 1944	14:30	Il-2	25 km (16 mi) south-southeast of Grigoriopol
– Claims with 12. Staffel of Jagdgeschwader 11 – Eastern Front — 24 June – 1 September 1944
According to Prien and Rodeike, Fassong claimed six undocumented aerial victories between June and September 1944. Authors Mathews and Foreman list eight distinct aerial victories in this period on the Eastern Front.
91	26 June 1944	19:45	Yak-9	PQ 25 Ost N/95554; 25 km (16 mi) west-southwest of Talachyn	95	17 July 1944	18:00	Yak-9	PQ 25 Ost N/41754; 10 km (6.2 mi) northeast of Brody
92	30 June 1944	17:20	B-25	PQ 25 Ost N/94143 vicinity of Byerazino	96	18 July 1944	14:51	P-39	PQ 25 Ost N/42582; 20 km (12 mi) northwest of Luboni
93	30 June 1944	17:25	P-39	PQ 25 Ost N/94184; 10 km (6.2 mi) east of Byerazino	97	19 July 1944	15:00	Il-2 m.H.	PQ 25 Ost N/32824; 20 km (12 mi) northeast of Kholm
94	9 July 1944	09:15	Il-2 m.H.	PQ 25 Ost N/55323 vicinity of Vilnius	98	19 July 1944	19:45	Yak-9	PQ 25 Ost N/32851; 15 km (9.3 mi) east of Kholm
– Claims with 12. Staffel of Jagdgeschwader 11 – Western Front — September – October 1944
99?	25 September 1944	—	P-47	vicinity of Arnhem	100?	25 September 1944	—	Spitfire	
– Claims with 12. Staffel of Jagdgeschwader 11 – Western Front — 17 December 1944 – 16 January 1945
101	24 December 1944	10:23	P-38	PQ 04 Ost N/SO, vicinity of Trier					

=== Awards ===
- Iron Cross (1939) 2nd and 1st Class
- Honor Goblet of the Luftwaffe on 13 September 1943 as Oberleutnant and pilot
- German Cross in Gold on 17 October 1943 as Oberleutnant in the 2./Jagdgeschwader 52
- Knight's Cross of the Iron Cross on 6 April 1944 as Oberleutnant and Staffelkapitän of the 12./Jagdgeschwader 11 (previously 2./Jagdgeschwader 52) (Note: According to Scherze on 8 April 1944 as Staffelkapitän of the 2./Jagdgeschwader 52.)

== Notes ==
Military offices
Preceded by Hauptmann Horst-Günther von Fassong	Commander of III. Gruppe of Jagdgeschwader 11; 2 January 1945 – 23 February 1945	Succeeded by Hauptmann Herbert Kutscha
Preceded by Oberleutnant Fritz Wegner	Commander of II. Gruppe of Jagdgeschwader 1 March 1945 – 24 April 1945	Succeeded by Hauptmann Rahe
