= Horst-Günther von Fassong =

German World War II fighter pilot

- Born: 27 April 1919; Kassel
- Died: 1 January 1945 (aged 25) near Maastricht, Netherlands
- Cause of death: Killed in action
- Military career
- Allegiance: Nazi Germany
- Branch: Heer, Luftwaffe
- Rank: Hauptmann (captain)
- Units: JG 51, JG 11
- Commands: 10./JG 51, 7./JG 11, III./JG 11
- Conflicts: See battles: World War II Eastern Front Battle of Kursk Defense of the Reich Operation Bodenplatte †
- Awards: Knight's Cross of the Iron Cross

Horst-Günther von Fassong (27 April 1919 – 1 January 1945) was a German Luftwaffe military aviator and fighter ace during World War II. Depending on source, he is credited between 63 and 136 aerial victories achieved in an unknown number of combat missions. This figure includes up to 90 aerial victories on the Eastern Front, and potentially further 46 victories over the Western Allies, including up to four four-engined bombers.

Born in Kassel, Fassong grew up in the Weimar Republic and Nazi Germany. A pre-war member of the German Army, he transferred to the Luftwaffe in 1940. Following flight training, he was posted to Jagdgeschwader 51 (JG 51—51st Fighter Wing) in 1941. Flying with this wing, Fassong claimed his first aerial victory on 3 July 1941 during Operation Barbarossa, the German invasion of the Soviet Union. He was made Staffelkapitän (squadron leader) of 10. Staffel (10th squadron) of JG 51 in February 1943. In May 1944, he was transferred and appointed Gruppenkommandeur (group commander) of III. Gruppe of Jagdgeschwader 11 (JG 11—11th Fighter Wing) fighting in Defense of the Reich. He was awarded the Knight's Cross of the Iron Cross on 27 July 1944 and killed in action on 1 January 1945 during Operation Bodenplatte.

== Career ==
Fassong was born on 27 April 1919 in Kassel, at the time in the Province of Hesse-Nassau, a Free State of Prussia within the Weimar Republic. His military career began with Aufklärungsabteilung 7, a reconnaissance battalion of the 4th Panzer Division. In May 1940, Fassong transferred to the Luftwaffe where he was trained as a fighter pilot. (Note: Flight training in the Luftwaffe progressed through the levels A1, A2 and B1, B2, referred to as A/B flight training. A training included theoretical and practical training in aerobatics, navigation, long-distance flights and dead-stick landings. The B courses included high-altitude flights, instrument flights, night landings and training to handle the aircraft in difficult situations.) In early 1941, he was posted to 3. Staffel (3rd squadron) of Jagdgeschwader 51 (JG 51—51st Fighter Wing). At the time, 3. Staffel was commanded by Oberleutnant Heinrich Krafft while I. Gruppe, to which the Staffel was subordinated, was headed by Hauptmann Hermann-Friedrich Joppien. The Gruppe was based on the English Channel, fighting the Royal Air Force (RAF). On 25 May, I. Gruppe was withdrawn from the Channel Front and moved to Krefeld Airfield for preparation for Operation Barbarossa, the German invasion of the Soviet Union.

=== Eastern Front ===
JG 51 area of operation during Operation Barbarossa was over the right flank of Army Group Center in the combat area of the 2nd Panzer Group as well as the 4th Army. In support of the Army crossing the Berezina, I. Gruppe was moved to an airfield at Babruysk on 2 July. The following day Fassong claimed his first two aerial victories in the vicinity of Rahachow when he shot down two Polikarpov I-16 fighters. German forces breached the Stalin Line and II. Gruppe was moved to an airfield at Stara Bychow, approximately 50 kilometres (31 miles) south of Mogilev on the Dnieper on 12 July where it stayed until 20 August. Fassong was severely injured, sustaining heavy burns, on 28 July when his Messerschmitt Bf 109 F-2 (Werknummer 9650—factory number) burst into flames during takeoff.

On 12 February 1943, Fassong was appointed Staffelkapitän (squadron leader) of 10. Staffel of JG 51. He succeeded Oberleutnant Wolfgang Böwing-Treuding who was killed in action the day before. The Staffel was subordinated to IV. Gruppe of JG 51, initially commanded by Hauptmann Hans Knauth and as of 1 March, by Major Rudolf Resch. The Gruppe had just completed conversion from the Bf 109 F-2 to the Focke-Wulf Fw 190 A-4 and was based at Smolensk. In that combat area, Army Group Centre had launched Operation Büffel, a series of retreats eliminating the Rzhev salient. On 10 June, during a Soviet attack on the Seshchinskaya and Bryansk Air Field, Fassong claimed three aerial victories in nine minutes.

=== Operation Citadel ===
On 5 July, German forces launched Operation Citadel in a failed attempt to eliminate the Kursk salient that initiated the Battle of Kursk. In preparation of this operation, IV. Gruppe was ordered to an airfield named Oryol-West and supported Generaloberst Walter Model's 9th Army on the northern pincer. That day, pilots of the Gruppe flew up to five combat missions in the combat area near Maloarkhangelsk. The Gruppe escorted bombers from Kampfgeschwader 4 (KG 4—4th Bomber Wing), KG 51 and KG 53 as well as Junkers Ju 87 dive bombers from Sturzkampfgeschwader 1 (StG 1—1st Dive Bomber Wing). The Gruppe claimed 36 aerial victories that day, including two Lavochkin La-5, an Ilyushin Il-2 ground attack aircraft, and a Douglas A-20 Havoc bomber also known as a Boston, by Fassong. The following day, Fassong for the first time became an "ace-in-a-day", claiming three Il-2 ground attack aircraft, two La-5 fighters and a Lavochkin-Gorbunov-Gudkov LaGG-3 fighter.

On 11 July, IV. Gruppe lost its commanding officer, Resch, who was killed in action. He was replaced by Major Hans-Ekkehard Bob who had to be transferred and took command of the Gruppe on 1 August. On 14 August, Fassong again became an "ace-in-a-day", and was credited with five Il-2 ground attack aircraft shot down west of Kharkov during the Soviet Belgorod–Kharkov offensive operation. Fassong was awarded the German Cross in Gold (Deutsches Kreuz in Gold) on 17 October 1943, and after 62 aerial victories was transferred to the Western Front.

=== Group commander ===
In early May 1944, Fassong was transferred to III. Gruppe of Jagdgeschwader 11 (JG 11—11th Fighter Wing), initially serving as Staffelkapitän of 7. Staffel after his predecessor had been killed in action. The Gruppe was based at Oldenburg Airfield and was fighting in Defence of the Reich. On 8 May, the United States Army Air Forces (USAAF) attacked Berlin and Braunschweig with 807 four-engined heavy bombers escorted by 855 fighter aircraft. JG 11 intercepted the bombers of the 1st and 3rd Bombardment Division on its way to Berlin in the vicinity of Verden an der Aller. In the resulting aerial combat, Fassong shot down a Boeing B-17 Flying Fortress bomber. Four days later on 12 May, the Eighth Army Air Force targeted the German fuel industry. In total 886 four-engined bombers, escorted by 980 fighter aircraft, headed for the five main synthetic fuel factories in middle Germany in area of Leuna, Merseburg, Böhlen and Zeitz, and the Protectorate of Bohemia and Moravia and Brüx. Defending against this attack, Fassong claimed a B-17 bomber shot down in a frontal attack on the bombers near Wiesbaden.

On 13 May, III. Gruppe moved from Oldenburg to Reinsehlen Airfield near Schneverdingen. On 22 May, 342 four-engined bombers 1st and 3rd Bombardment Division attacked Kiel. JG 11 fighters intercepted the USAAF bombers west of Neumünster. In this encounter Fassong claimed a B-17 bomber destroyed. In late May, Fassong succeeded Major Anton Hackl as Gruppenkommandeur (group commander) of III. Gruppe of JG 11. On 6 June, the Allies launched Operation Overlord, the successful invasion of German-occupied Western Europe, on 6 June. To defend against this invasion, the Luftwaffe relocated many of its fighter and bomber units to France. III. Gruppe was one of the few units not sent to France but at the time remained in Reinsehlen. In early June, the Gruppe was augmented by 2. Staffel of Jagdgeschwader 52 (JG 52—52nd Fighter Wing) led by Oberleutnant Paul-Heinrich Dähne. The Staffel then was redesignated and became the 12. Staffel of JG 11 and was subordinated to Fassong's command. When on 22 June Soviet forces launched Operation Bagration, III. Gruppe was ordered to relocate to the Eastern Front where it was to be deployed in the combat area of Minsk and fought in the Minsk Offensive. On 27 July, Fassong was awarded the Knight's Cross of the Iron Cross (Ritterkreuz des Eisernen Kreuzes).

The Gruppe flew its last combat missions on the Eastern Front on 1 September. During its ten-week tenure in the east, III. Gruppe pilots claimed approximately 125 aerial victories, including nine by Fassong, for the loss of twelve pilots killed or missing and further eleven injured or wounded in combat. The Gruppe then moved to an airfield at Riesa-Leutewitz for a brief period of rest and replenishment. On 17 September 1944 Allied forces launched Operation Market Garden, the operation to cross the Rhine at Arnhem. The following day, III. Gruppe was ordered to Achmer Airfiled to support the German defense.

=== Operation Bodenplatte and death ===
In preparation for Operation Bodenplatte, III. Gruppe was moved to an airfield at Großostheim, near Aschaffenburg on 17 December 1944. Fassong had learned of the planned operation on 5 December at a meeting held at the headquarters of the II. Jagdkorps (2nd Fighter Corps) commanded by Generalmajor Dietrich Peltz. Fassong informed his Staffelkapitäne of the upcoming operation on 15 December without going into the specifics of the target and date. At 06:30 on 1 January, Fassong briefed his pilots of the operation and that their target would be the Asch Airfield (Designated: Y-29) located north-west of Maastricht. At 08:18, Fassong led a flight of 31 Fw 190 A-8 fighter aircraft to Frankfurt where they were joined by other Luftwaffe fighters.

Fassong was last seen in aerial combat near Maastricht. Unteroffizier Armin Mehling, Fassong's wingman, reported that Fassong was shot down by two P-47 Thunderbolts over Asch flying a Fw 190 A-8 (Werknummer 682 792—factory number). The flight was flying at a height of 15 to 20 meters (49 to 66 feet) when they were pounced upon by six P-47s. Fassong's aircraft was hit and burned immediately. The aircraft crashed in a big ball of flames near Opglabbeek. Following his death, command of III. Gruppe was given to Oberleutnant Paul-Heinrich Dähne.

== Summary of career ==
=== Aerial victory claims ===
According to Spick, Fassong was credited with 136 aerial victories, 90 of which claimed over the Eastern Front and 46 in the western theater of operations, including four heavy bombers. Obermaier lists him with 75, potentially about 80, aerial victories, among them 10 claimed over the Western Front, including four heavy bombers. Mathews and Foreman, authors of Luftwaffe Aces — Biographies and Victory Claims, researched the German Federal Archives and found records for 63 aerial victory claims. This figure includes 61 aerial victories on the Eastern Front and two heavy bombers over the Western Allies.

Victory claims were logged to a map-reference (PQ = Planquadrat), for example "PQ 35 Ost 46443". The Luftwaffe grid map (Jägermeldenetz) covered all of Europe, western Russia and North Africa and was composed of rectangles measuring 15 minutes of latitude by 30 minutes of longitude, an area of about 360 square miles (930 km^{2}). These sectors were then subdivided into 36 smaller units to give a location area 3 km × 4 km (1.9 mi × 2.5 mi) in size.

Chronicle of aerial victories
This and the ♠ (Ace of spades) indicates those aerial victories which made Fassong an "ace-in-a-day", a term which designates a fighter pilot who has shot down five or more airplanes in a single day. This and the ? (question mark) indicates information discrepancies listed by Prien, Stemmer, Rodeike, Bock, Mathews and Foreman.
| Claim | Date | Time | Type | Location | Claim | Date | Time | Type | Location |
– 3. Staffel of Jagdgeschwader 51 – Operation Barbarossa — 22 June – 28 July 1941
| 1 | 3 July 1941 | 10:30 | I-16 | southeast of Rahachow | 2 | 3 July 1941 | 10:35 | I-16 | 30 km (19 mi) southeast of Rahachow |
– 3. Staffel of Jagdgeschwader 51 "Mölders" – Eastern Front — 1 May 1942 – 3 February 1943
| 3 | 3 May 1942 | 09:25 | MiG-3 | | 4 | 13 July 1942 | 08:06 | MiG-3 | |
According to Prien, Stemmer, Rodeike and Bock, Fassong claimed one undocumented aerial victory between 30 May and 15 September 1942. This claim is not documented by Mathews and Foreman.
– 10. Staffel of Jagdgeschwader 51 "Mölders" – Eastern Front — 12 February 1943 – April 1944
| 6 | 8 March 1943 | 09:27 | Il-2 | PQ 35 Ost 46443; 20 km (12 mi) east-southeast of Dugino | 35 | 5 August 1943 | 07:39 | Boston | east of Trifonovka |
| 7 | 9 May 1943 | 07:55 | P-39 | PQ 35 Ost 63581; 20 km (12 mi) southwest of Maloarkhangelsk | 36♠ | 14 August 1943 | 18:15 | Il-2 m.H. (Note: The "m.H." refers to an Ilyushin Il-2 with rear gunner (mit Heckschütze).) | south of Rakitnoye |
| 8 | 2 June 1943 | 03:56 | La-5 | PQ 35 Ost 63774; 15 km (9.3 mi) east-southeast of Fatezh | 37♠ | 14 August 1943 | 18:16 | Il-2 m.H. | east of Bodowka |
| 9 | 2 June 1943 | 10:30 | LaGG-3 | PQ 35 Ost 62322 vicinity of Kursk | 38♠ | 14 August 1943 | 18:17 | Il-2 m.H. | southeast of Belunow-Gorb |
| 10 | 10 June 1943 | 19:11 | La-5 | PQ 35 Ost 34281; 25 km (16 mi) east-northeast of Seshchinskaya | 39♠ | 14 August 1943 | 18:21 | Il-2 m.H. | south of Burinovka |
| 11 | 10 June 1943 | 19:16 | Pe-2 | PQ 35 Ost 34232; 25 km (16 mi) southeast of Kirov | 40♠ | 14 August 1943 | 18:24 | Il-2 m.H. | north of Dobropolye |
| 12 | 10 June 1943 | 19:20 | Pe-2 | PQ 35 Ost 35833; 20 km (12 mi) southwest of Utrikowo | 41 | 18 August 1943 | 06:14 | Yak-1 | south of Krassnoye-Yar |
| 13 | 5 July 1943 | 10:06 | La-5 | PQ 35 Ost 63564; 10 km (6.2 mi) southwest of Maloarkhangelsk | 42 | 18 August 1943 | 17:42 | Il-2 m.H. | south of Jelisawetinski |
| 14 | 5 July 1943 | 10:22 | La-5 | PQ 35 Ost 63653; 15 km (9.3 mi) east-southeast of Maloarkhangelsk | 43 | 18 August 1943 | 17:54 | Boston | southeast of Dmitriyevka |
| 15 | 5 July 1943 | 12:35 | Il-2 | PQ 35 Ost 63573; 20 km (12 mi) south-southeast of Trosna | 44 | 22 August 1943 | 17:38 | Pe-2 | south of Bolgar |
| 16 | 5 July 1943 | 13:24 | Boston | PQ 35 Ost 63653; 15 km (9.3 mi) east-southeast of Maloarkhangelsk | 45 | 27 October 1943 | 07:34 | Yak-1 | north of Krivoj-Rog |
| 17♠ | 6 July 1943 | 04:24 | Il-2 m.H. | PQ 35 Ost 63572; 20 km (12 mi) south-southeast of Trosna | 46 | 29 October 1943 | 06:03 | Il-2 m.H. | northeast of Pokrowskoje |
| 18♠ | 6 July 1943 | 04:28 | Il-2 m.H. | PQ 35 Ost 63544; 10 km (6.2 mi) south-southeast of Trosna | 47 | 29 October 1943 | 06:05 | Il-2 m.H. | southeast of Mitrofanowka |
| 19♠ | 6 July 1943 | 04:32 | Il-2 m.H. | PQ 35 Ost 63553; 15 km (9.3 mi) west of Maloarkhangelsk | 48 | 29 October 1943 | 06:06 | Il-2 m.H. | south-southwest of Nova Praha |
| 20♠ | 6 July 1943 | 10:55 | LaGG-3 | PQ 35 Ost 63652; 15 km (9.3 mi) east-southeast of Maloarkhangelsk | 49 | 29 October 1943 | 06:08 | Il-2 m.H. | southeast of Nova Praha |
| 21♠ | 6 July 1943 | 11:09 | La-5 | PQ 35 Ost 63712; 10 km (6.2 mi) east of Fatezh | 50 | 13 November 1943 | 10:35 | Yak-1 | 1 km (0.62 mi) north of Petronowo |
| 22♠ (Note: This claim is not listed by Mathews and Foreman.) | 6 July 1943 | 11:37 | La-5 | PQ 35 Ost 63363 | 51 | 27 November 1943 | 09:15 | Il-2 m.H. | 1 km (0.62 mi) northeast of Kapustjana |
| 23 | 9 July 1943 | 08:31 | MiG-3 | PQ 35 Ost 63591; 15 km (9.3 mi) south-southwest of Maloarkhangelsk | 52 | 29 November 1943 | 12:02 | Il-2 | 2 km (1.2 mi) south-east of Annowojewka |
| 24 | 9 July 1943 | 08:36 | Il-2 m.H. | PQ 35 Ost 63594; 15 km (9.3 mi) south-southwest of Maloarkhangelsk | 53 | 29 November 1943 | 12:04 | Il-2 | 10 km (6.2 mi) south of Dnjeprowka |
| 25 | 13 July 1943 | 07:16 | Il-2 m.H. | PQ 35 Ost 74773; 20 km (12 mi) south-southwest of Verkhovye | 54 | 11 January 1944 | 14:42 | Il-2 m.H. | 20 km (12 mi) south-southwest of Koziatyn |
| 26 | 13 July 1943 | 07:19 | Il-2 m.H. | PQ 35 Ost 74772; 20 km (12 mi) south-southwest of Verkhovye | 55 | 11 January 1944 | 14:45 | Il-2 m.H. | 10 km (6.2 mi) southwest of Koziatyn |
| 27 | 13 July 1943 | 07:53 | Il-2 m.H. | PQ 35 Ost 64813; 10 km (6.2 mi) south of Mtsensk | 56 | 11 January 1944 | 14:46 | Il-2 m.H. | 25 km (16 mi) south-southwest of Koziatyn |
| 28 | 17 July 1943 | 12:01 | LaGG-3 | PQ 35 Ost 63634; 25 km (16 mi) east-northeast of Maloarkhangelsk | 57 | 15 January 1944 | 14:33 | Il-2 m.H. | 40 km (25 mi) east-northeast of Vinnytsia |
| 29 | 17 July 1943 | 12:03 | LaGG-3 | PQ 35 Ost 63631; 25 km (16 mi) east-northeast of Maloarkhangelsk | 58 | 15 January 1944 | 14:35 | Il-2 m.H. | 45 km (28 mi) south-southeast of Koziatyn |
| 30 | 22 March 1943 | 19:55 | Il-2 m.H. | PQ 35 Ost 44818; 15 km (9.3 mi) east-southeast of Bryansk | 59 | 24 January 1944 | 14:00 | Il-2 m.H. | 40 km (25 mi) southeast of Koziatyn |
| 31 | 22 July 1943 | 19:58 | Il-2 m.H. | PQ 35 Ost 44831; 15 km (9.3 mi) northwest of Karachev | 60 | 25 January 1944 | 11:15 | Il-2 m.H. | 30 km (19 mi) east-northeast of Vinnytsia |
| 32 | 2 August 1943 | 12:05 | LaGG-3 | PQ 35 Ost 53623; 15 km (9.3 mi) west of Trosna | 61 | 25 January 1944 | 11:18 | Il-2 m.H. | 40 km (25 mi) south-southeast of Koziatyn |
| 33 | 3 August 1943 | 17:55? (Note: According to Mathews and Foreman claimed at 17:53.) | Il-2 m.H. | PQ 35 Ost 54552 | 62 | 25 January 1944 | 11:20 | Il-2 m.H. | 25 km (16 mi) south-southeast of Koziatyn |
| 34 | 5 August 1943 | 07:36 | Boston | south of Jassenok | | | | | |
– 7. Staffel of Jagdgeschwader 11 – Defense of the Reich — April – May 1944
| 63 | 8 May 1944 | 09:46 | B-17 | PQ 05 Ost S/ES/FS, southwest of Verden | 65? | 22 May 1944 | — | B-17 | |
| 64 | 12 May 1944 | 12:26 | B-17 | PQ 05 Ost S/QQ/QR, vicinity of Wiesbaden | 66? | 28 May 1944 | — | B-17 | |
– Stab III. Gruppe of Jagdgeschwader 11 – Eastern Front — June – September 1944
According to Prien and Rodeike, Fassong claimed nine undocumented aerial victories between June and September 1944. Only one of these claims is documented by Mathews and Foreman.
| 73 | 22 July 1944 | 15:19 | R-5 | PQ 25 Ost N/32591 | | | | | |

=== Awards ===
- Iron Cross (1939) 2nd and 1st Class
- Honor Goblet of the Luftwaffe on 20 September 1943 as Oberleutnant and pilot
- German Cross in Gold on 17 October 1943 as Oberleutnant in the 10./Jagdgeschwader 51
- Knight's Cross of the Iron Cross on 27 July 1944 as Hauptmann and Gruppenkommandeur of the III./Jagdgeschwader 11
