= Wytoka, Opole Voivodeship =

Wytoka
- Village
- Location within Poland
- Coordinates: 50°00′03″N 18°31′57″E
- Country: Poland
- Voivodeship: Opole
- County: Olesno
- Gmina: Rudniki
- Population: 8

Wytoka [vɨˈtɔka] is a village in the administrative district of Gmina Rudniki, within Olesno County, Opole Voivodeship, in south-western Poland.
