= Stawki Żytniowskie =

- Village
- Location within Poland
- Coordinates: 51°01′04″N 18°35′12″E
- Country: Poland
- Voivodeship: Opole
- County: Olesno
- Gmina: Rudniki
- Population: 27

Stawki Żytniowskie [ˈstafki ʐɨtˈɲɔfskʲɛ] is a village in the administrative district of Gmina Rudniki, within Olesno County, Opole Voivodeship, in south-western Poland. Before 2023, the settlement was part of the Żurawie colony.
