= Teodorówka, Opole Voivodeship =

Teodorówka
- Village
- Location within Poland
- Coordinates: 51°02′48″N 18°35′38″E
- Country: Poland
- Voivodeship: Opole
- County: Olesno
- Gmina: Rudniki
- Population: 53

Teodorówka [tɛɔdɔˈrufka] is a village in the administrative district of Gmina Rudniki, within Olesno County, Opole Voivodeship, in south-western Poland.
