= Ignachy =

- Village
- Location within Poland
- Coordinates: 51°00′56″N 18°32′43″E
- Country: Poland
- Voivodeship: Opole
- County: Olesno
- Gmina: Rudniki
- Population: 50

Ignachy [iɡˈnaxɨ] is a village in the administrative district of Gmina Rudniki, within Olesno County, Opole Voivodeship, in south-western Poland.
