= Mostki, Opole Voivodeship =

Mostki
- Village
- Location within Poland
- Coordinates: 51°2′32″N 18°39′8″E
- Country: Poland
- Voivodeship: Opole
- County: Olesno
- Gmina: Rudniki
- Population: 126 (2,008)

Mostki [ˈmɔstki] is a village in the administrative district of Gmina Rudniki, within Olesno County, Opole Voivodeship, in south-western Poland. Its population is about 126 people. It has a small population and a local setting, and it is part of the historical and administrative area of Silesia in southwestern Poland.
