= Jaworek, Opole Voivodeship =

Jaworek
- Village
- Location within Poland
- Coordinates: 51°1′52″N 18°37′8″E
- Country: Poland
- Voivodeship: Opole
- County: Olesno
- Gmina: Rudniki
- Population: 188

Jaworek [jaˈvɔrɛk] is a village in the administrative district of Gmina Rudniki, within Olesno County, Opole Voivodeship, in south-western Poland.
