= Odcinek =

- Village
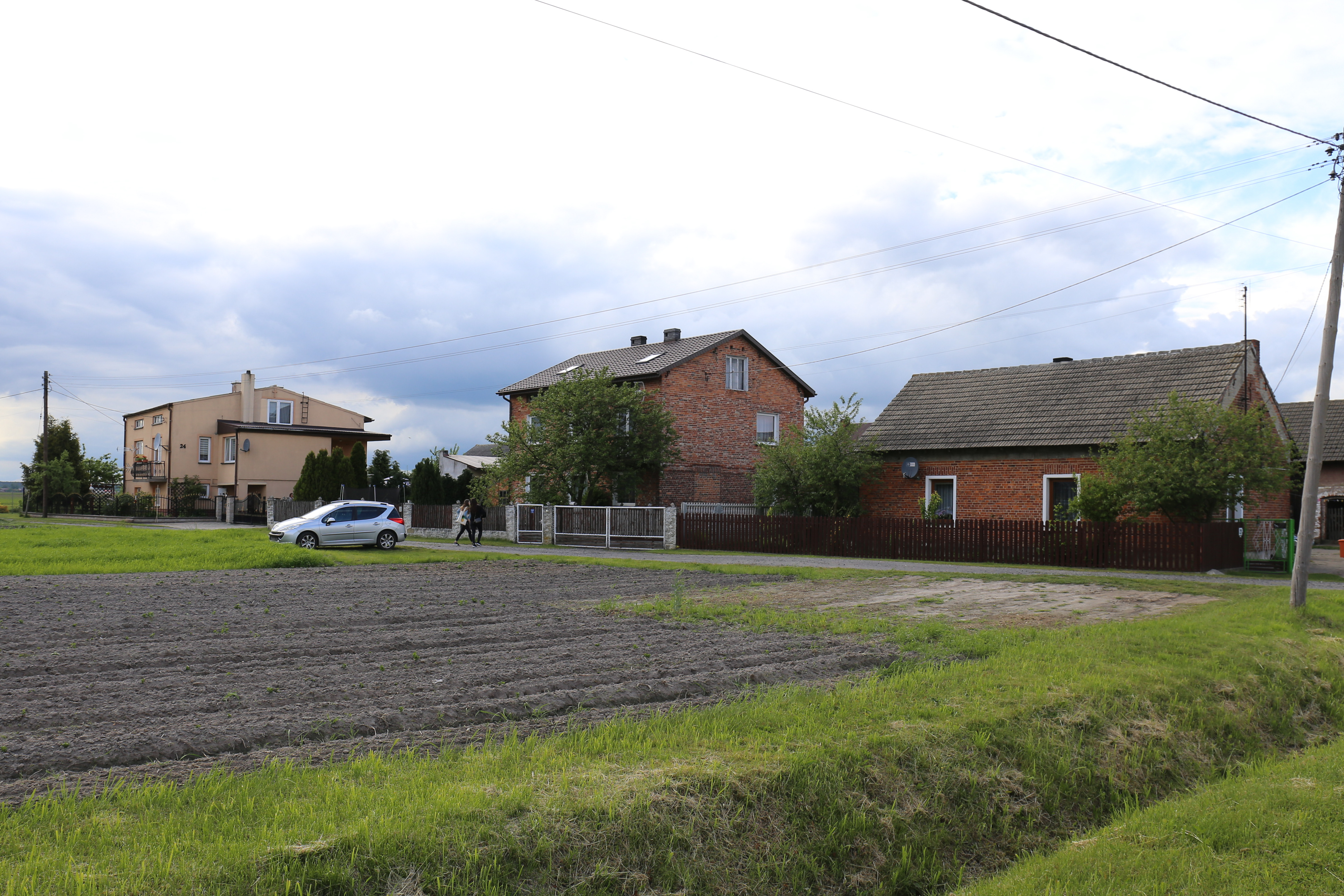

- Location within Poland
- Coordinates: 51°3′58″N 18°34′8″E
- Country: Poland
- Voivodeship: Opole
- County: Olesno
- Gmina: Rudniki
- Population: 214

Odcinek [ɔtˈt͡ɕinɛk] is a village in the administrative district of Gmina Rudniki, within Olesno County, Opole Voivodeship, in south-western Poland.
