= Chwiły =

- Village
- Location within Poland
- Coordinates: 51°2′N 18°33′E
- Country: Poland
- Voivodeship: Opole
- County: Olesno
- Gmina: Rudniki
- Population: 130

Chwiły [ˈxfiwɨ] is a village in the administrative district of Gmina Rudniki, within Olesno County, Opole Voivodeship, in south-western Poland.
