= Stanki, Opole Voivodeship =

Stanki
- Village
- Location within Poland
- Coordinates: 50°58′15″N 18°39′06″E
- Country: Poland
- Voivodeship: Opole
- County: Olesno
- Gmina: Rudniki
- Population: 53

Stanki [ˈstanki] is a village in the administrative district of Gmina Rudniki, within Olesno County, Opole Voivodeship, in south-western Poland.
