= Kuźnica Żytniowska =

- Village
- Location within Poland
- Coordinates: 51°0′N 18°33′E
- Country: Poland
- Voivodeship: Opole
- County: Olesno
- Gmina: Rudniki

Kuźnica Żytniowska (Polish pronunciation: [kuʑˈɲit͡sa ʐɨtˈɲɔfska]) is a village in the administrative district of Gmina Rudniki, within Olesno County, Opole Voivodeship, in south-western Poland.
