= Kuźnica, Opole Voivodeship =

Kuźnica
- Village
- Location within Poland
- Coordinates: 51°3′34″N 18°32′25″E
- Country: Poland
- Voivodeship: Opole
- County: Olesno
- Gmina: Rudniki
- Population: 85

Kuźnica (Polish pronunciation: [kuʑˈɲit͡sa]) is a village in the administrative district of Gmina Rudniki, within Olesno County, Opole Voivodeship, in south-western Poland.
