= Dalachów =

- Village
- Location within Poland
- Coordinates: 51°04′36″N 18°35′08″E
- Country: Poland
- Voivodeship: Opole
- Powiat: Olesno
- Gmina: Rudniki
- Area: 7.5 km^{2} (2.9 sq mi)
- Population (2004): 1,295
  - Density: 173/km^{2} (450/sq mi)
- Time zone: UTC+1 (CET)
  - Summer (DST): UTC+2 (CEST)
- Postal code: 46-321
- Area code: +48 34
- Car Plates: OOL

Dalachów [daˈlaxuf] is a village in the administrative district of Gmina Rudniki, within Olesno County, Opole Voivodeship, in south-western Poland.

In 2004 the village had a population of 1,295.

== Gallery ==
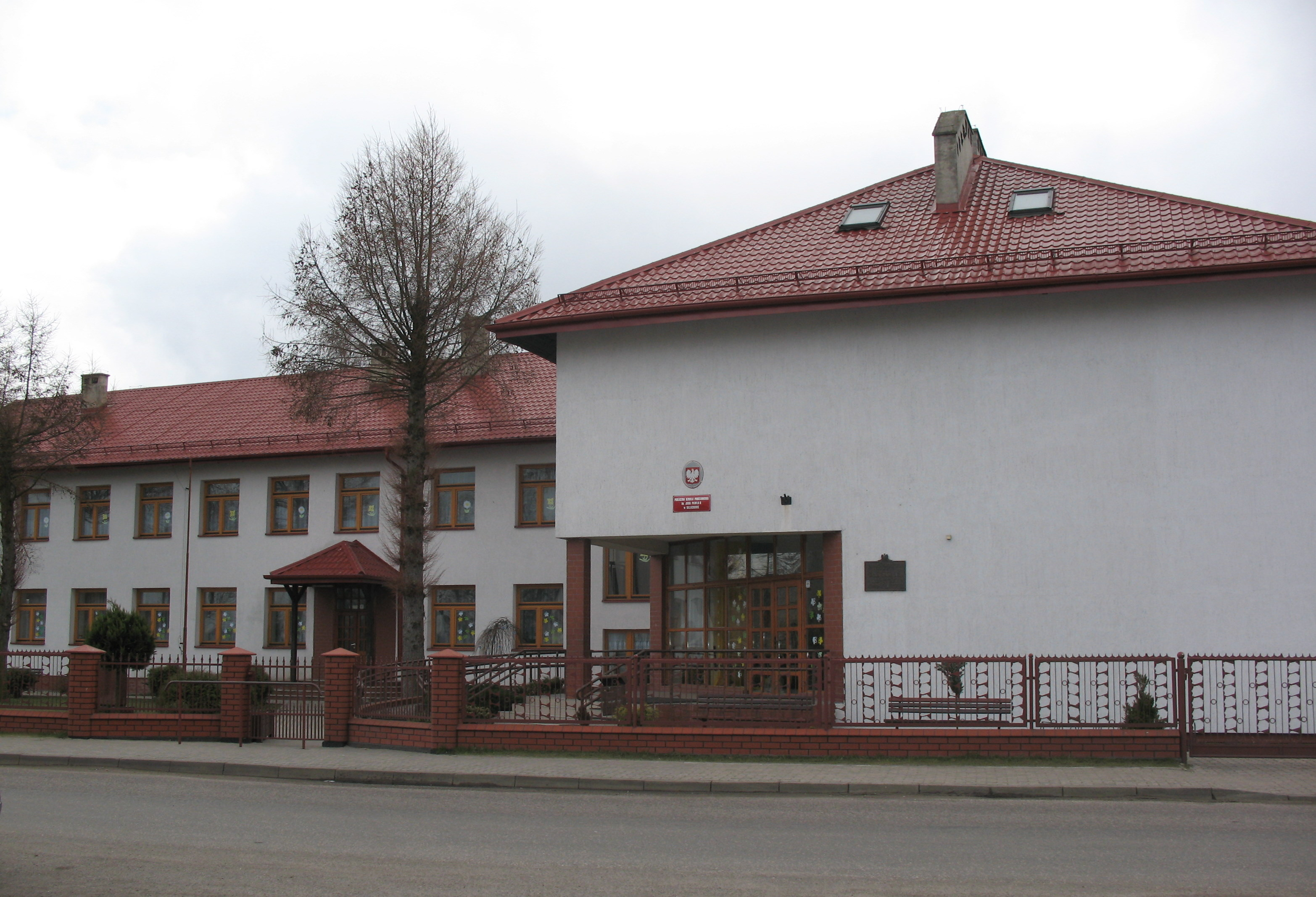
Elementary School in Dalachów

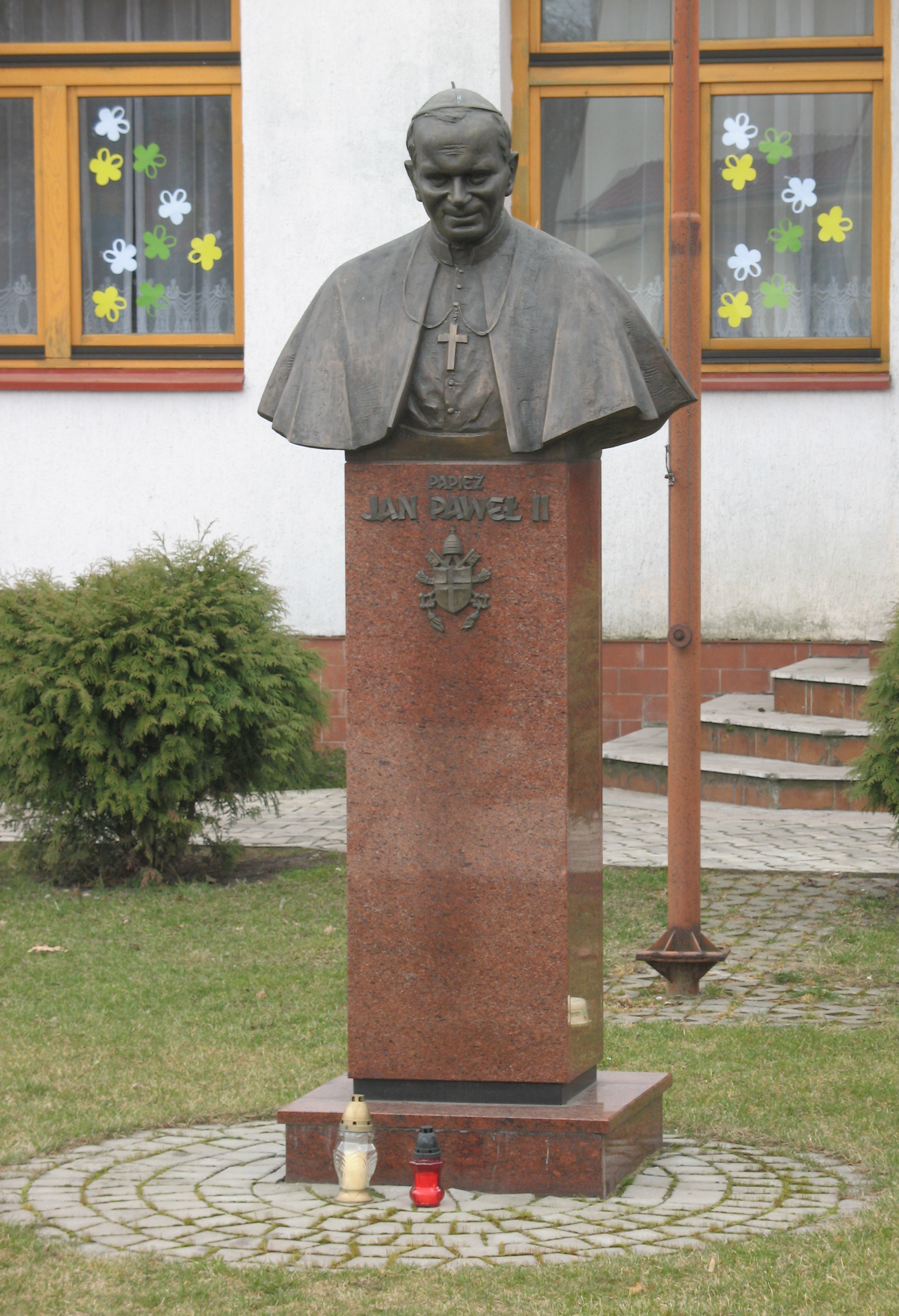
Bust of John Paul II in front of Elementary School in Dalachów

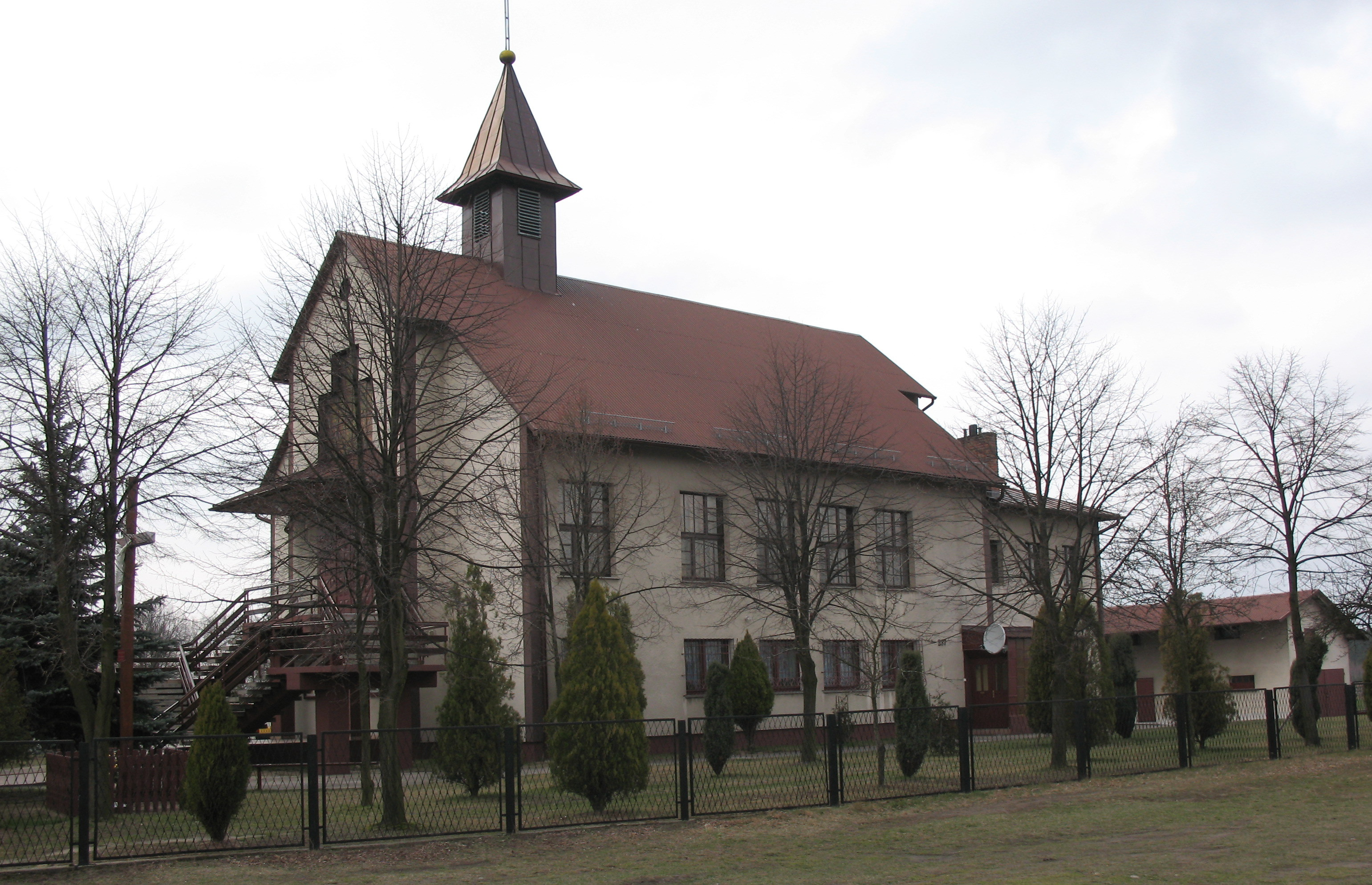
Church in Dalachów

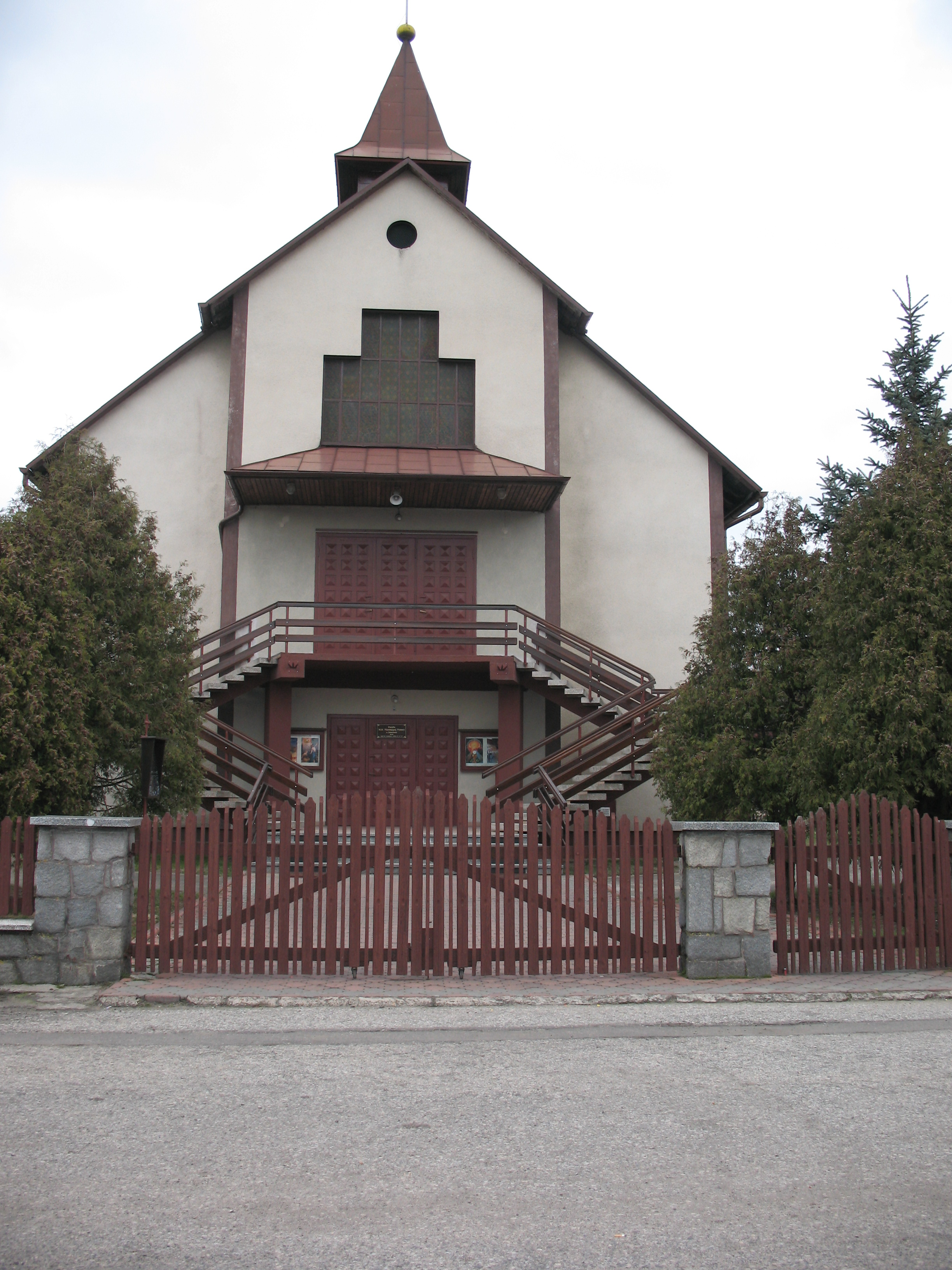
Front of church in Dalachów
