= Faustianka =

- Village
- Location within Poland
- Coordinates: 51°2′21″N 18°33′9″E
- Country: Poland
- Voivodeship: Opole
- County: Olesno
- Gmina: Rudniki
- Population: 167

Faustianka [fausˈtjanka] is a village in the administrative district of Gmina Rudniki, within Olesno County, Opole Voivodeship, in south-western Poland.
