= Stary Bugaj =

- Village
- Location within Poland
- Coordinates: 50°59′42″N 18°37′6″E
- Country: Poland
- Voivodeship: Opole
- County: Olesno
- Gmina: Rudniki
- Population: 238

Stary Bugaj [ˈstarɨ ˈbuɡai̯] is a village in the administrative district of Gmina Rudniki, within Olesno County, Opole Voivodeship, in south-western Poland.
