= Pieńki, Opole Voivodeship =

Pieńki
- Village
- Location within Poland
- Coordinates: 50°59′05″N 18°35′45″E
- Country: Poland
- Voivodeship: Opole
- County: Olesno
- Gmina: Rudniki
- Population: 45

Pieńki [ˈpjɛɲki] is a village in the administrative district of Gmina Rudniki, within Olesno County, Opole Voivodeship, in south-western Poland.
