= Żytniów =

- Village
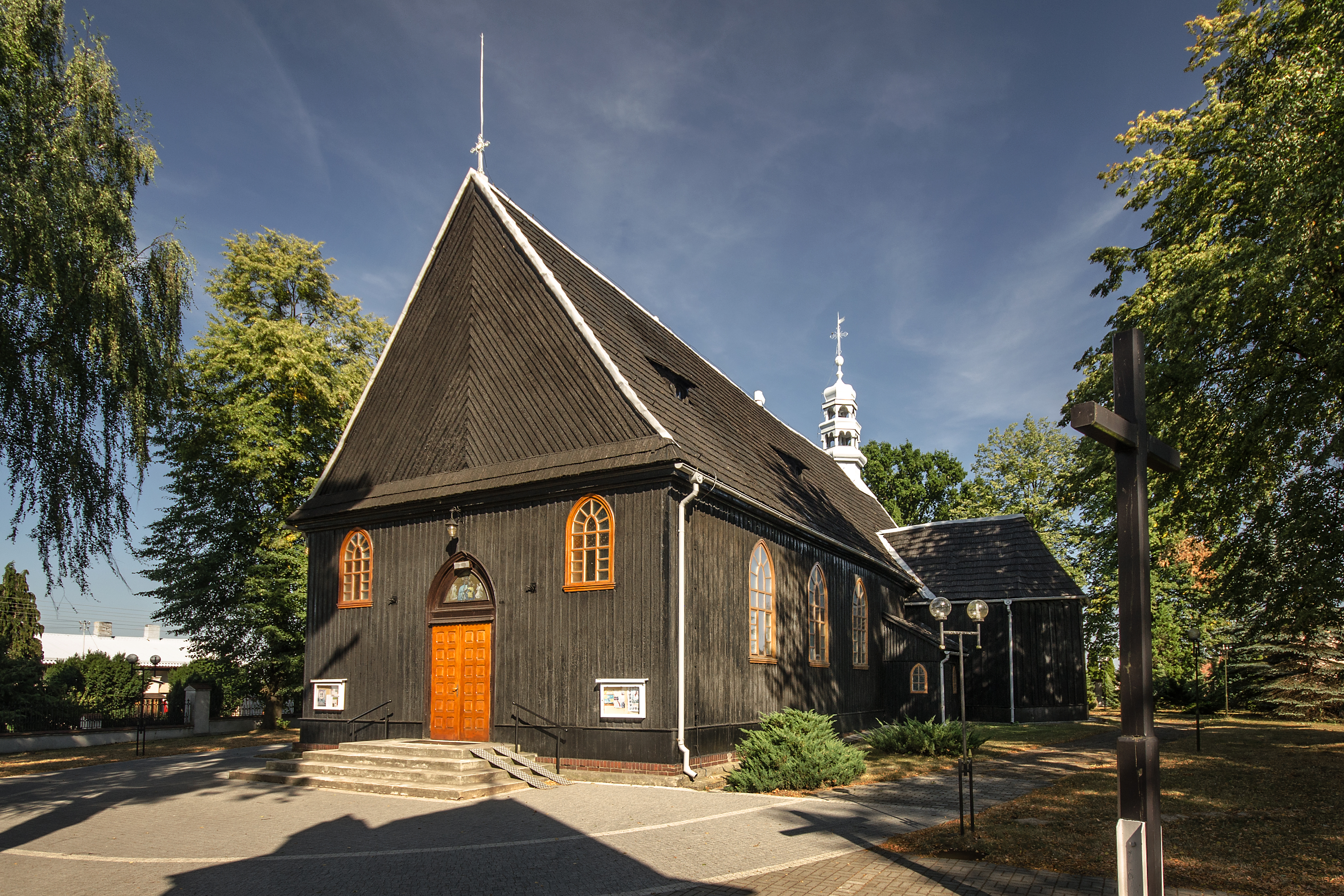
- Catholic church

- Location within Poland
- Coordinates: 51°0′52″N 18°34′5″E
- Country: Poland
- Voivodeship: Opole
- County: Olesno
- Gmina: Rudniki
- Population: 1,115

Żytniów [ˈʐɨtɲuf] is a village in the administrative district of Gmina Rudniki, within Olesno County, Opole Voivodeship, in south-western Poland.
