= Bobrowa, Opole Voivodeship =

Bobrowa
- Village
- Location within Poland
- Coordinates: 50°59′N 18°38′E
- Country: Poland
- Voivodeship: Opole
- County: Olesno
- Gmina: Rudniki
- Highest elevation: 223.5 m (733 ft)
- Lowest elevation: 219 m (719 ft)
- Population: 277

Bobrowa [bɔˈbrɔva] is a village in the administrative district of Gmina Rudniki, within Olesno County, Opole Voivodeship, in south-western Poland.
