= Tudora =

Tudora may refer to:

- Tudora, Botoșani, a commune in Botoşani County, Romania
- Tudora, Ştefan Vodă, a commune in Ştefan Vodă district, Moldova
- Tudora (gastropod), a genus of land snails in the family Pomatiidae
