= Bugaj, Opole Voivodeship =

Bugaj
- Village
- Location within Poland
- Coordinates: 50°59′31.89″N 18°38′13.63″E
- Country: Poland
- Voivodeship: Opole
- County: Olesno
- Gmina: Rudniki

Bugaj [ˈbuɡai̯] is a village in the administrative district of Gmina Rudniki, within Olesno County, Opole Voivodeship, in south-western Poland.
