= Jelonki, Opole Voivodeship =

Jelonki
- Village
- Location within Poland
- Coordinates: 51°0′15″N 18°32′36″E
- Country: Poland
- Voivodeship: Opole
- County: Olesno
- Gmina: Rudniki
- Population: 194

Jelonki [jɛˈlɔnki] is a village in the administrative district of Gmina Rudniki, within Olesno County, Opole Voivodeship, in south-western Poland.
