= Łazy, Opole Voivodeship =

Łazy
- Village
- Location within Poland
- Coordinates: 51°2′47″N 18°34′5″E
- Country: Poland
- Voivodeship: Opole
- County: Olesno
- Gmina: Rudniki

Population
  - Total: 142
- Time zone: UTC+1 (CET)
  - Summer (DST): UTC+2 (CEST)

Łazy [ˈwazɨ] is a village in the administrative district of Gmina Rudniki, within Olesno County, Opole Voivodeship, in southern Poland.
