= Borek, Olesno County =

Borek
- Village
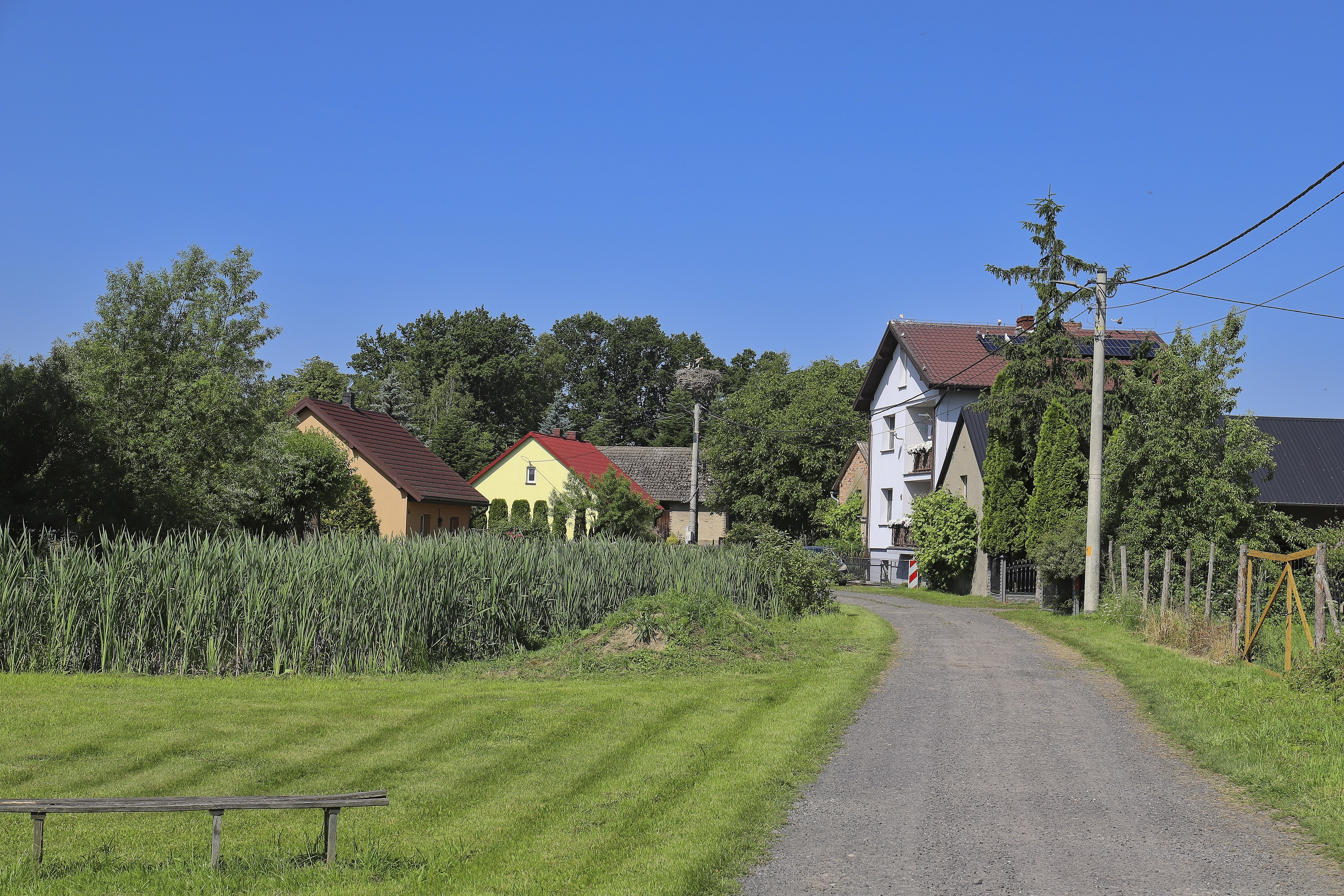

- Location within Poland
- Coordinates: 50°58′44″N 18°36′23″E
- Country: Poland
- Voivodeship: Opole
- County: Olesno
- Gmina: Rudniki
- Population: 18

Borek [ˈbɔrɛk] is a village in the administrative district of Gmina Rudniki, within Olesno County, Opole Voivodeship, in south-western Poland.
