= Krzepice =

Town in Silesian Voivodeship, Poland

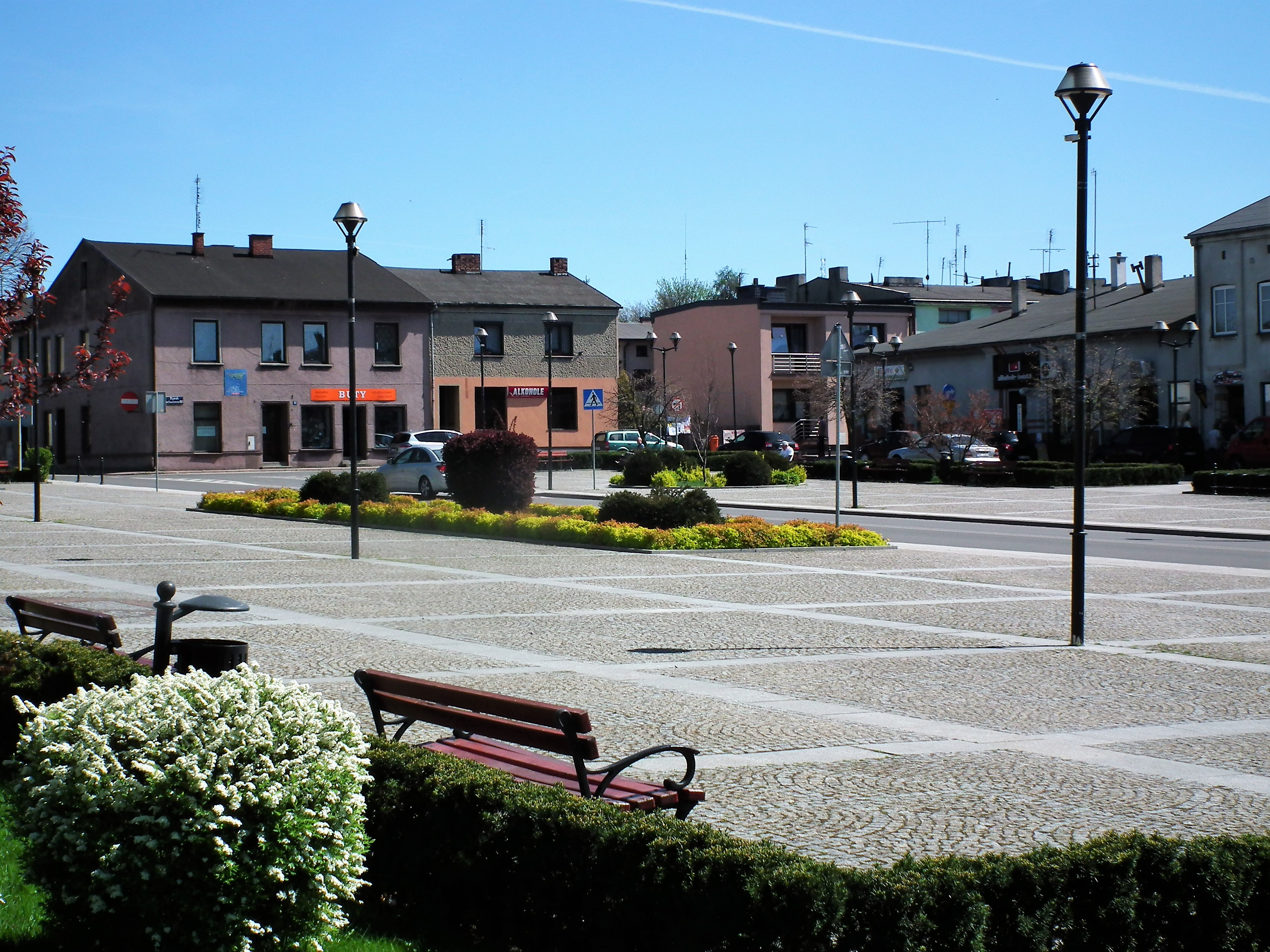
- Town center

- Coat of arms

- Location within Poland
- Coordinates: 50°58′2″N 18°43′55″E
- Country: Poland
- Voivodeship: Silesian
- County: Kłobuck
- Gmina: Krzepice
- Established: 12th century
- Town rights: 1357

Government
  - Mayor: Krystian Kotynia

Area
  - Total: 27.71 km^{2} (10.70 sq mi)

Population (2019-06-30)
  - Total: 4,456
  - Density: 160.8/km^{2} (416.5/sq mi)
- Time zone: UTC+1 (CET)
  - Summer (DST): UTC+2 (CEST)
- Postal code: 42-160
- Area code: +48 34
- Vehicle registration: SKL
- Climate: Cfb
- Website: http://krzepice.pl/

Krzepice (pronounced [kʂɛˈpʲit͡sɛ]) is a town in Kłobuck County, Silesian Voivodeship, in southern Poland It is located near Częstochowa in the historic region of Lesser Poland near the historic border with Silesia and Greater Poland.

== Etymology ==
The name Krzepice, mentioned for the first time in 1356 as Crzepycze, comes from a last name Krzepa; most probably, members of this family lived in the area of the town. In a Latin language medieval document of the Roman Catholic Archdiocese of Wrocław (Liber fundationis episcopatus Vratislaviensis), written in 1295–1305, Krzepice is spelled Crippicz antiquum.

== History ==
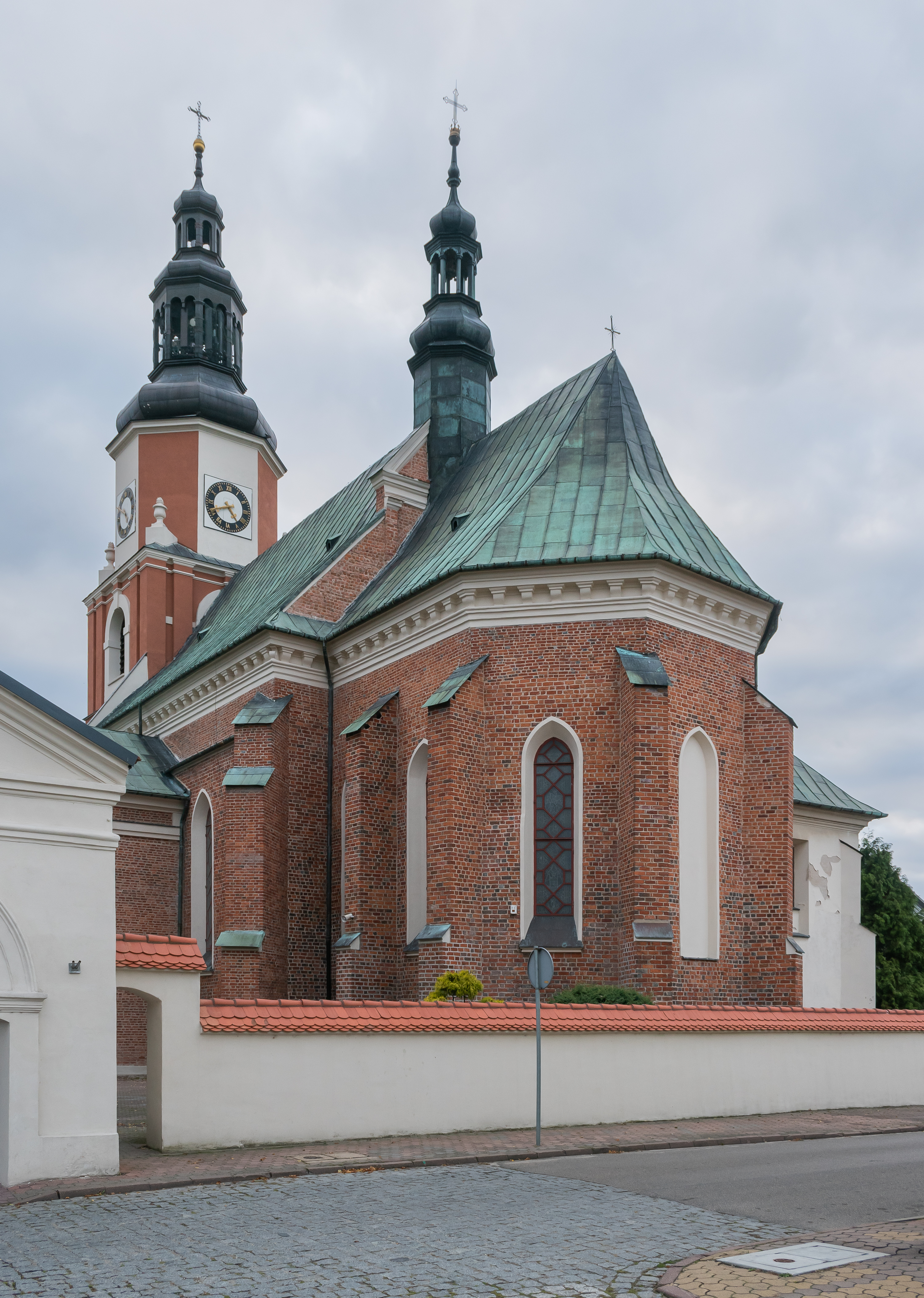
Saint James church in Krzepice

In the Middle Ages, Krzepice was a border town, guarding the northwestern corner of Lesser Poland. In the 12th century, a wooden stronghold was built here, then it was replaced by a wooden castle, which in the 14th century was rebuilt into a stone complex. Today, only parts of a moat is all that remains of the castle. In 1357, King Casimir III the Great erected a parish church. Krzepice was most probably incorporated in 1357, but there is speculation that it had taken place in the mid-13th century. In 1370, King Louis I of Poland granted Krzepice as a temporary feudal fee to Duke Władysław Opolczyk. After a few years, the town was directly reintegrated with Poland. It was a royal town of the Polish Crown, administratively located in the Lelów County in the Kraków Voivodeship in the Lesser Poland Province.

On March 15, 1552, King Sigismund II Augustus specified the boundaries of the town. In its center there was a main market square, with six streets, and with parish church of St. Jacob. Due to convenient location, near the border with Silesia (which at that time was part of Kingdom of Bohemia), Krzepice became a local trade center, with fairs, and three market squares. This part of the Kingdom of Poland was located away from main military conflicts, and the town prospered, especially in the period known as Polish Golden Age. It changed during the Swedish invasion of Poland (1655–1656), when both Krzepice and the ancient castle were destroyed by the Swedes. Ruins of the castle remained until 1927, when they were finally demolished. The town frequently burned (1450, 1527, 1656, 1867, 1881, 1903, 1904, 1906), which was due to its wooden architecture.

In the Second Partition of Poland of 1793, the town was annexed by the Kingdom of Prussia, and made part of the newly established province of New Silesia. In 1807, it was passed to the short-lived Polish Duchy of Warsaw, and after the duchy's dissolution it passed to Russian-controlled Congress Poland in 1815. In 1870, Russian authorities of Congress Poland reduced Krzepice to the status of a village, as a reprisal for its inhabitants' participation in the January Uprising. In 1914, a dairy cooperative was founded in Krzepice. In 1918 it returned to Poland, as the country regained independence. Krzepice regained its town status in 1919, when already it was part of Kielce Voivodeship.

=== World War II ===
On September 3, 1939, during the German invasion of Poland which started World War II, German troops committed a massacre of 30 Poles in Krzepice (see Nazi crimes against the Polish nation); the town was then occupied by Germany until 1945. The Polish resistance was quickly organized in Krzepice, and already on 29 November 1939, it launched an attack on a German police station.

Two local Polish policemen were murdered by the Russians in the Katyn massacre in 1940.

Krzepice had a sizeable Jewish community, 43% of the town's population, before World War II. In early 1940, the Germans set up an open type ghetto there with about 1,800 inmates, along with Judenrat and the Jewish police. The Jews were forced to perform slave labor until the liquidation of the ghetto in June and July 1942, when most of them were sent by train to Auschwitz extermination camp and murdered. Those who remained were deported to the ghetto in Sosnowiec. Only a handful survived the Holocaust; most subsequently left Poland. The stone-and-brick synagogue in Krzepice, built around 1822, still stands, although unused and in a dilapidated state. The historic Jewish Cemetery is close by.

After World War II, Krzepice remained in Kielce Voivodeship until 1950, when it became part of Katowice Voivodeship.

== Transport ==
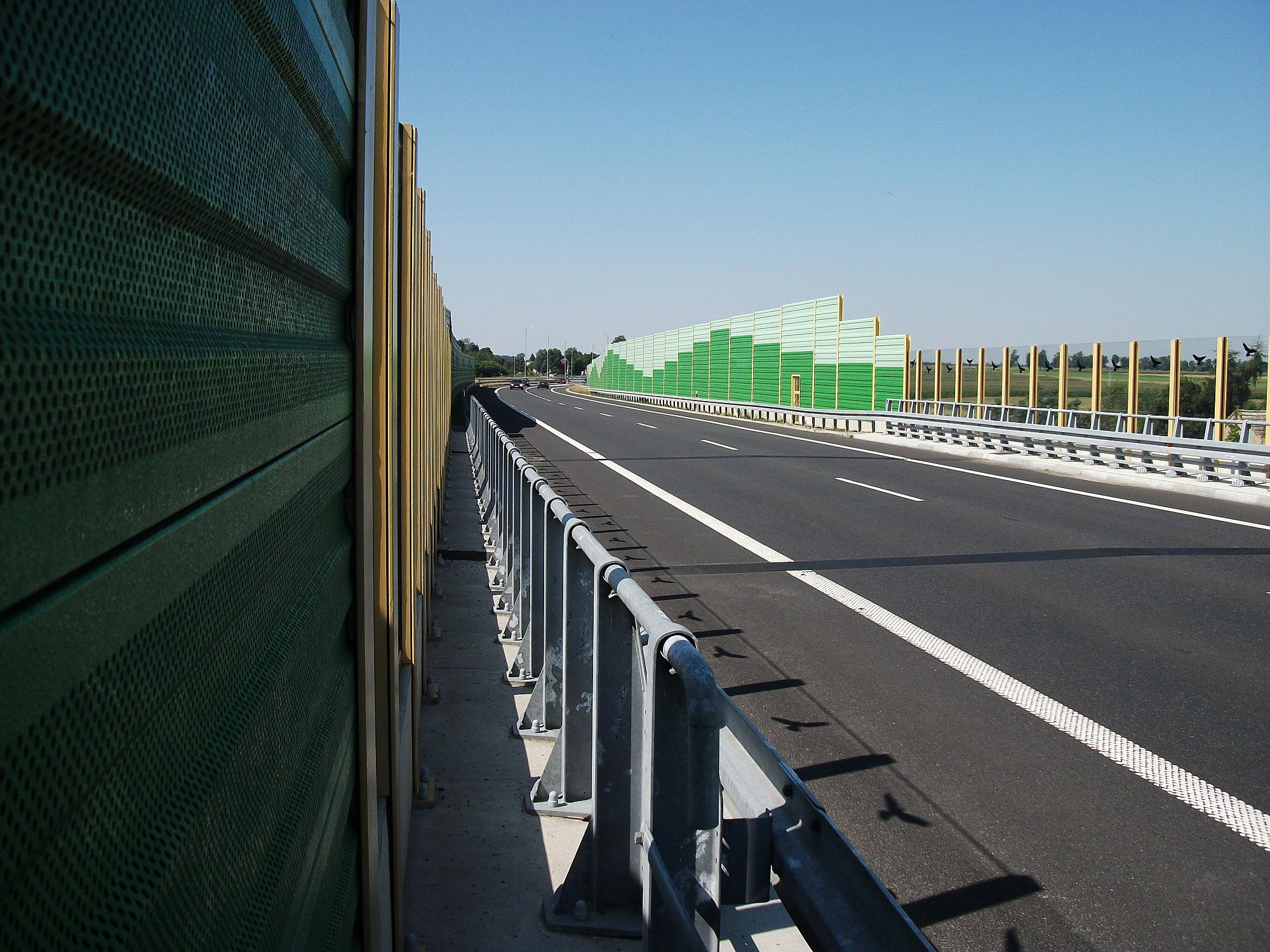
Bypass Krzepice - National Road 43 (Częstochowa-Wieluń)

Main highway connections from the Krzepice include those with Wieluń (to the north-west) and Częstochowa (to the south-east) via National road 43. A bypass of the town was opened in 2009. Krzepice is linked by rail to Wieluń and Katowice, with a station, on a line from Herby Nowe to Wieluń, built in 1926.

== Cuisine ==
The officially protected traditional foods from Krzepice are local butter (masło krzepickie) and quark (twaróg krzepicki), as designated by the Ministry of Agriculture and Rural Development of Poland.

== Demographics ==
Historical population

Year	Pop.	±%
1890	4,039	—
1897	3,220	−20.3%
1910	4,589	+42.5%
1921	4,168	−9.2%
1931	5,881	+41.1%

Year	Pop.	±%
1939	6,000	+2.0%
1950	4,065	−32.2%
1960	4,145	+2.0%
2010	4,472	+7.9%

== Sports ==
The town is home to a football club, Liswarta Krzepice, established in 1946. It competes in the lower leagues.
