= Jaworzno, Opole Voivodeship =

Jaworzno
- Village
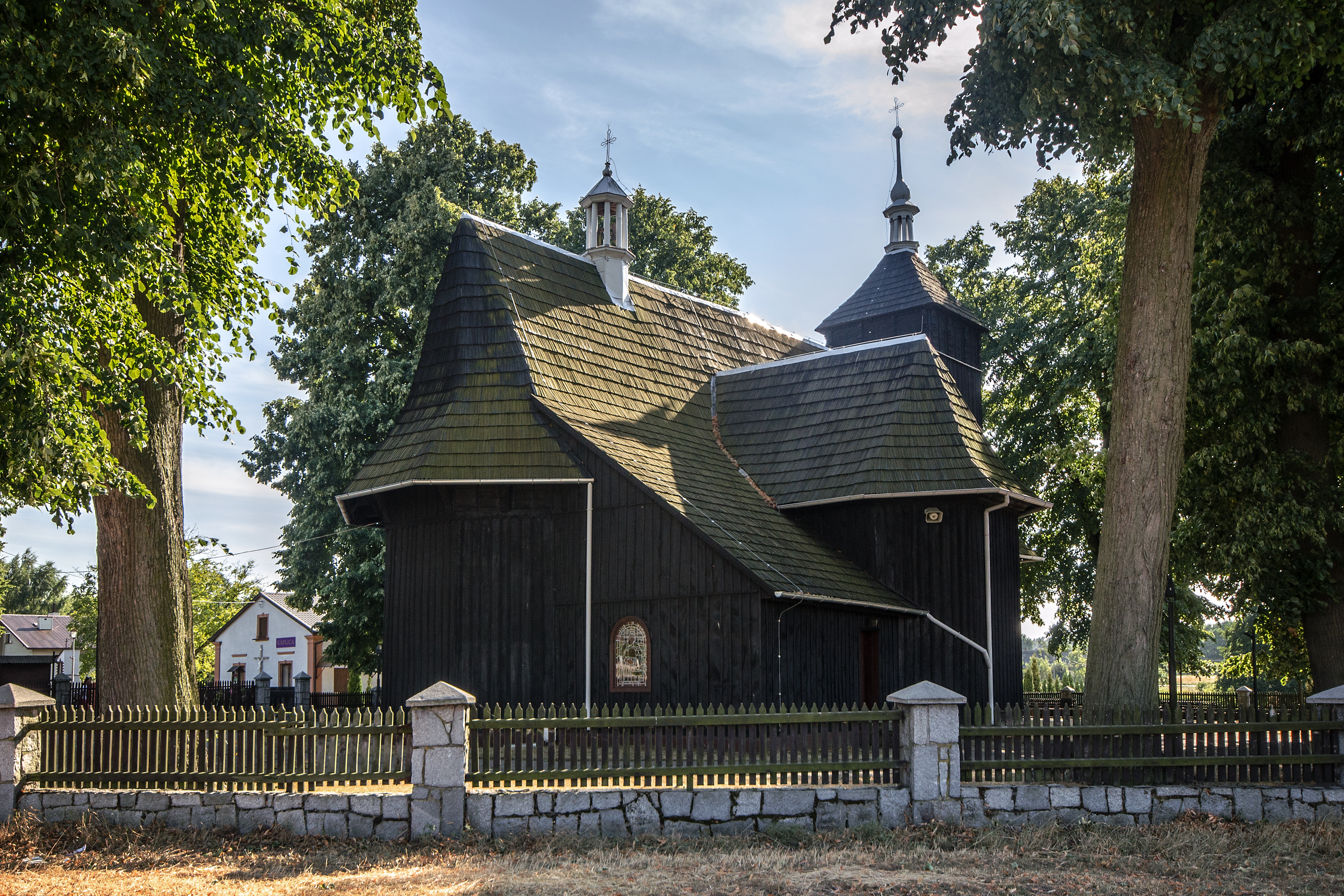
- Church of Holy Trinity

- Location within Poland
- Coordinates: 51°1′45″N 18°38′52″E
- Country: Poland
- Voivodeship: Opole
- County: Olesno
- Gmina: Rudniki

Population
  - Total: 525
- Time zone: UTC+1 (CET)
  - Summer (DST): UTC+2 (CEST)
- Vehicle registration: OOL

Jaworzno [jaˈvɔʐnɔ] is a village in the administrative district of Gmina Rudniki, within Olesno County, Opole Voivodeship, in southern Poland.

== History ==
In 1827, the village had a population of 531.

19 Polish citizens were murdered by Nazi Germany in the village during World War II.
