= Żurawie, Opole Voivodeship =

Żurawie
- Village
- Location within Poland
- Coordinates: 51°1′N 18°36′E
- Country: Poland
- Voivodeship: Opole
- County: Olesno
- Gmina: Rudniki
- Population: 81

Żurawie [ʐuˈravjɛ] is a village in the administrative district of Gmina Rudniki, within Olesno County, Opole Voivodeship, in south-western Poland.
