= Julianpol =

- Village
- Location within Poland
- Coordinates: 51°0′27″N 18°39′27″E
- Country: Poland
- Voivodeship: Opole
- County: Olesno
- Gmina: Rudniki
- Population: 508

Julianpol [juˈljanpɔl] is a village in the administrative district of Gmina Rudniki, within Olesno County, Opole Voivodeship, in south-western Poland.
