= Nowy Bugaj =

- Village
- Location within Poland
- Coordinates: 50°59′18″N 18°39′02″E
- Country: Poland
- Voivodeship: Opole
- County: Olesno
- Gmina: Rudniki
- Population: 286

Nowy Bugaj [ˈnɔvɨ ˈbuɡai̯] is a village in the administrative district of Gmina Rudniki, within Olesno County, Opole Voivodeship, in south-western Poland.
