= Dobropolye =

Dobropolye Доброполье
- Settlement
- Location within Belgorod Oblast Location within Russia
- Coordinates: 50°26′N 35°47′E
- Country: Russia
- Region: Belgorod Oblast
- District: Grayvoronsky District
- Time zone: UTC+3:00

Dobropolye (Russian: Доброполье) is a rural locality (a settlement) in Grayvoronsky District, Belgorod Oblast, Russia. The population was 52 as of 2010. There is 1 street.

== Geography ==
Dobropolye is located 25 km southeast of Grayvoron (the district's administrative centre) by road. Novostroyevka-Vtoraya is the nearest rural locality.
