= Rudniki, Opole Voivodeship =

Rudniki
- Village
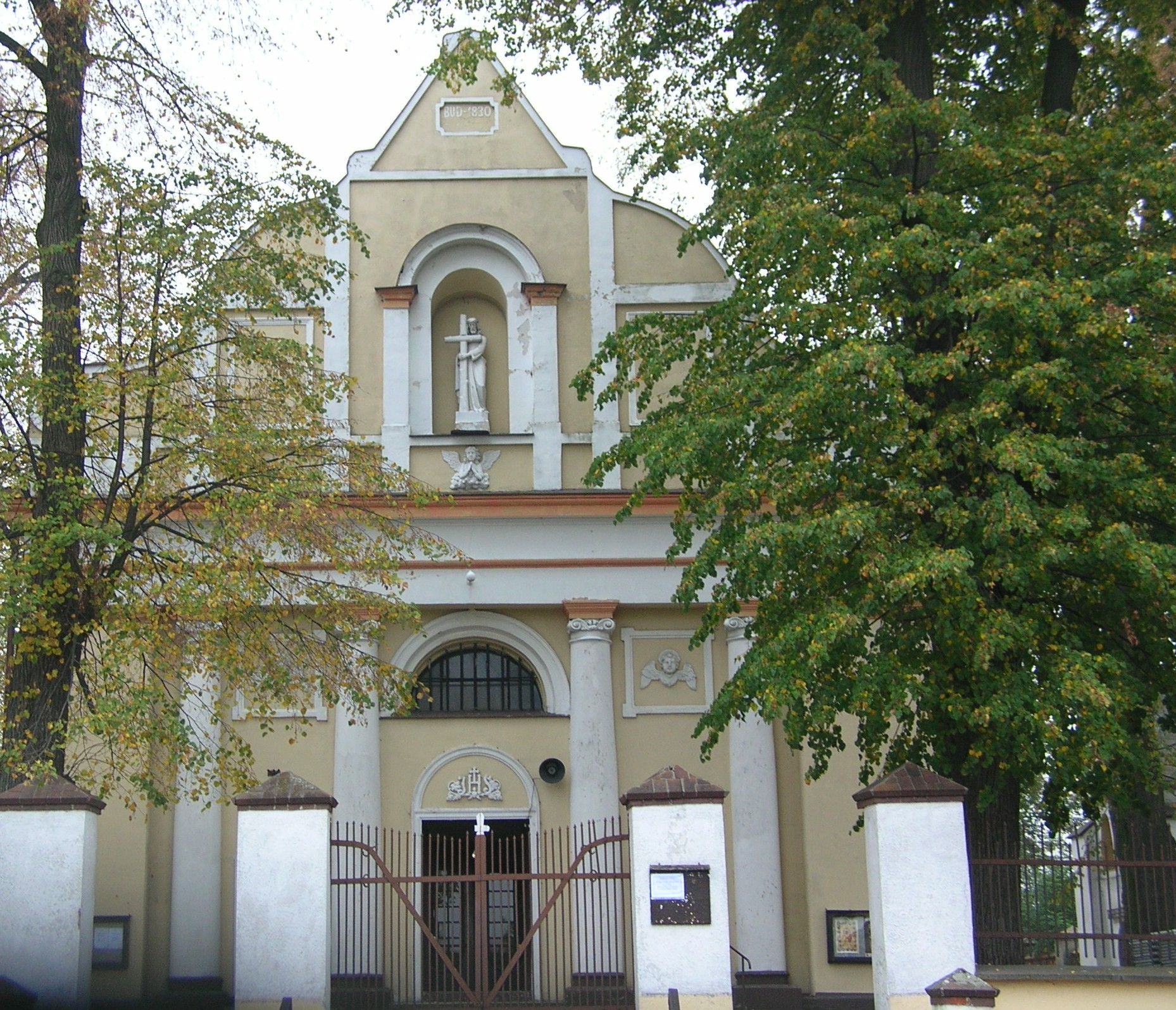
- St. Nicholas church in Rudniki

- Location within Poland
- Coordinates: 51°02′19″N 18°35′46″E
- Country: Poland
- Voivodeship: Opole
- Powiat: Olesno
- Gmina: Rudniki
- Area: 5.4 km^{2} (2.1 sq mi)
- Population (2004): 897
  - Density: 166/km^{2} (430/sq mi)
- Time zone: UTC+1 (CET)
  - Summer (DST): UTC+2 (CEST)
- Postal code: 46-325
- Area code: +48 34
- Car Plates: OOL

Rudniki [rudˈniki] is a village in Olesno County, Opole Voivodeship, in south-western Poland. It is the seat of the gmina (administrative district) called Gmina Rudniki.

In 2004 the village had a population of 897.
