= Gmina Rudniki =

Gmina Rudniki Rudniki Commune
- Gmina
- Flag Coat of arms
- Interactive map of Gmina Rudniki
- Coordinates (Rudniki): 51°2′19″N 18°35′46″E
- Country: Poland
- Voivodeship: Opole
- County: Olesno
- Seat: Rudniki

Area
  - Total: 100.52 km^{2} (38.81 sq mi)

Population (2019-06-30)
  - Total: 8,180
  - Density: 81.4/km^{2} (211/sq mi)
- Time zone: UTC+1 (CET)
  - Summer (DST): UTC+2 (CEST)
- Vehicle registration: OOL
- Website: https://rudniki.pl

Gmina Rudniki is a rural gmina (administrative district) in Olesno County, Opole Voivodeship, in southern Poland. Its seat is the village of Rudniki, which lies approximately 23 kilometres (14 mi) north-east of Olesno and 63 km (39 mi) north-east of the regional capital Opole.

The gmina covers an area of 100.52 square kilometres (38.8 sq mi), and as of 2019 its total population is 8,180.

== Neighbouring gminas ==
Gmina Rudniki is bordered by the gminas of Krzepice, Lipie, Pątnów, Praszka and Radłów.

== Villages ==
The gmina contains the villages of Banasiówka, Bliźniaki, Bobrowa, Borek, Brzeziny Cieciułowskie, Bugaj, Chwiły, Cieciułów, Dalachów, Faustianka, Hajdamaki, Ignachy, Janinów, Jaworek, Jaworzno, Jaworzno Bankowe, Jelonki, Julianpol, Kuźnica, Kuźnica Żytniowska, Łazy, Mirowszczyzna, Młyny, Mostki, Nowy Bugaj, Odcinek, Pieńki, Polesie, Porąbki, Rudniki, Słowików, Stanki, Stary Bugaj, Stawki Cieciułowskie, Stawki Żytniowskie, Teodorówka, Wytoka, Żurawie and Żytniów.

Of these, the following have the status of sołectwo: Bobrowa, Bugaj, Chwiły, Cieciułów, Dalachów, Faustianka, Janinów, Jaworek, Jaworzno, Jelonki, Julianpol, Kuźnica, Łazy, Mirowszczyzna, Młyny, Mostki, Odcinek, Porąbki, Rudniki, Słowików, Żytniów.

== Twin towns – sister cities ==
Gmina Rudniki is twinned with:

- Feilitzsch, Germany
- Soblahov, Slovakia
