= Tudora, Ștefan Vodă =

Tudora
- Village
- Location in Moldova
- Coordinates: 46°26′N 30°03′E
- Country: Moldova
- District: Ștefan Vodă District

Population (2014 census)
  - Total: 1,767
- Time zone: UTC+2 (EET)
  - Summer (DST): UTC+3 (EEST)

Tudora is a village in Ștefan Vodă District, Moldova.

A border crossing into Ukraine is located here. The crossing on the Ukrainian side is called Starokozache.

== Gallery ==
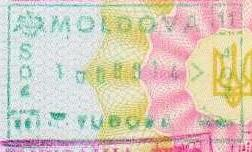
