= Olesno County =

Olesno County Powiat oleski
- County
- Flag Coat of arms

- Location within the voivodeship
- Coordinates (Olesno): 50°52′30″N 18°25′0″E
- Country: Poland
- Voivodeship: Opole
- Seat: Olesno
- Gminas: Total 7: Gmina Dobrodzień; Gmina Gorzów Śląski; Gmina Olesno; Gmina Praszka; Gmina Radłów; Gmina Rudniki; Gmina Zębowice

Area
  - Total: 973.62 km^{2} (375.92 sq mi)

Population
  - Total: 64,411
  - Density: 66.156/km^{2} (171.34/sq mi)
  - Urban: 23,201
  - Rural: 41,210
- Car plates: OOL
- Website: www.powiatoleski.pl

Olesno County (Polish: powiat oleski) is a unit of territorial administration and local government (powiat) in Opole Voivodeship, south-western Poland. It came into being on January 1, 1999, as a result of the Polish local government reforms passed in 1998. Its administrative seat and largest town is Olesno, which lies 42 kilometres (26 mi) north-east of the regional capital Opole. The county contains three other towns: Praszka, 20 km (12 mi) north of Olesno, Dobrodzień, 17 km (11 mi) south of Olesno, and Gorzów Śląski, 18 km (11 mi) north of Olesno.

The county covers an area of 973.62 square kilometres (375.9 sq mi). As of 2019 its total population is 64,411. The most populated towns are Olesno with 9,374 inhabitants and Praszka with 7,655 inhabitants.

== Neighbouring counties ==
Olesno County is bordered by Wieruszów County and Wieluń County to the north, Kłobuck County to the east, Lubliniec County to the south-east, Strzelce County to the south, Opole County to the south-west, and Kluczbork County to the west.

== Administrative division ==
The county is subdivided into seven gminas (four urban-rural and three rural). These are listed in the following table, in descending order of population.

Gmina	Type	Area (km^{2})	Population (2019)	Seat
Gmina Olesno	urban-rural	240.8	17,726	Olesno
Gmina Praszka	urban-rural	102.8	13,537	Praszka
Gmina Dobrodzień	urban-rural	162.8	9,877	Dobrodzień
Gmina Rudniki	rural	100.5	8,180	Rudniki
Gmina Gorzów Śląski	urban-rural	154.1	7,131	Gorzów Śląski
Gmina Radłów	rural	86.0	4,308	Radłów
Gmina Zębowice	rural	95.8	3,652	Zębowice
