= Ulvella =

Ulvella is the scientific name of two genera and may refer to:

- Ulvella (alga) P.L.Crouan & H.M.Crouan, 1859, a genus of algae in the family Ulvellaceae
- Ulvella (fungus) (Nyl.) Trevis. 1880, a genus of fungi of uncertain placement in the division Ascomycota
