= Noemí Ramírez =

Mexican visual artist (born 1957)

Noemí Ramírez (born 1957) is a Mexican visual artist, whose work has been recognized with several honors including membership in the Salón de la Plástica Mexicana.

== Life ==
Ramírez has a bachelor's in graphic arts, a master's in visual Arts from the Faculty of Arts and Design (formerly the Escuela Nacional de Artes Plásticas) of the National Autonomous University of Mexico and a certificate in art curation from the Universidad Autónoma del Estado de México. She has taken various courses in drawing, painting, sculpture, ceramics, raku-yaki, lithography, ceramic graphics and more.

== Career ==
Ramírez has participated in over 150 collective exhibitions in Mexico, the United States, Canada, Poland, Cuba and Japan. Important individual exhibitions include Re-visiones at the Pino Suarez Metro Station (2005), La Nave Va at the Universidad Autónoma Metropolitana (2002), Trastiempos at the Universidad Pedágogica Nacional, Y Pasaron por el Tiempo at the Museo de Arte Moderno (1988) and Presencias at the Carrillo Gil Art Museum (1985) .

The artist has received awards for her work such as the Utsukushi-ga-hara at the second Rodin Grand Prize in Japan in 1988, and honorary mention at the fourth International Youth Art Encounter in Mexico in 1984 with another honorary mention at the Salon Biennal of Tapestry and Textile Art in Mexico in 1982. She has also received grants from FONCA as a “intellectual creator” in 1992.

Her works can be found in public and private collections such as those of the Utsukushi-ga-hara Open Air Museum in Japan, the José Luis Cuevas Museum in Mexico City, the Stilon Art Museum in Gorzow, Poland, the Museo Universitario de Ciencias y Artes at UNAM, the Contemporary Art Museum of Morelia (Mexico) and others.

Ramírez has been a professor at the Faculty of Art and Design (UNAM, 1979–1992, 2002–present). From 2002 to 2008, she was the coordinator of the cultural promotion department of the institution, arranging art exhibitions at the school.

Her work has been featured on television shows such as Creando Ando. Escultura TV UNAM (2011), El arte y los artistas, Canal 30 (1999), Los Escultores en México, Canal 22 and TV UNAM (1992) and Hoy en la Cultura, Canal 9 (1992) .

== Artistry ==
Ramírez's work is figurative, characterized by her interest in the manipulations of textures and color, working in two and three dimensional modes, principally painting, sculpture and relief work. She combines traditional techniques and materials with new ones including works in wood, resins, steel, ceramic and paper over wire, often mixing.
