= Budzów =

Budzów may refer to the following places in Poland:

- Budzów, Lower Silesian Voivodeship (south-west Poland)
- Budzów, Łódź Voivodeship (central Poland)
- Budzów, Lesser Poland Voivodeship (south Poland)
- Budzów, Opole Voivodeship (south-west Poland)
