= Nathanael Pringsheim =

German botanist (1823–1894)

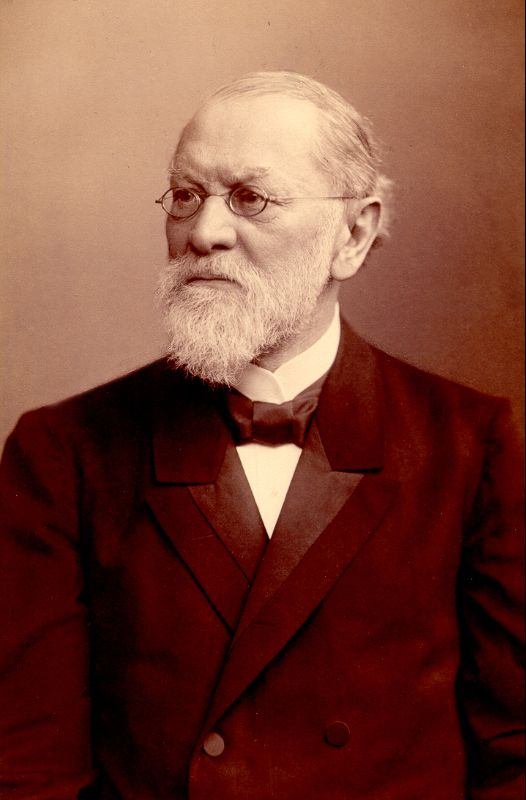
- Nathanael Pringsheim
- Born: 30 November 1823; Landsberg, Prussian Silesia
- Died: 6 October 1894 (aged 70); Berlin
- Education: University of Wrocław; University of Leipzig; University of Berlin
- Known for: algology
- Scientific career
- Fields: botany

Nathanael Pringsheim (30 November 1823 – 6 October 1894) was a German botanist. He specialized in the algae, studying their sexual reproduction, and worked as a professor of botany at the University of Jena from 1864 but resigned in 1868 to conduct research at home. He discovered sexual reproduction in the algae and examined the alternation of generations in lower plants. He proposed the idea that chlorophyll evolved as a pigment to protect the plant cell from damage. He founded the journal Jahrbücher für wissenschaftliche Botanik, and helped found the German Botanical Society and the marine biological research station at Heligoland.

== Life and work ==
Pringsheim was born at Wziesko (now Dobrodzien), Landsberg, Prussian Silesia, where his father was an industrialist from a wealthy Jewish heritage. His grandfather owned iron works. He was one of nine siblings. After private tuitions he went to the gymnasium in Oppeln. He was later sent to Breslau to the Friedrichsgymnasium where he received a school leaving certificate after two attempts in 1843. and studied at the universities of Breslau, Leipzig, and Berlin successively. While at Leipzig in 1844, Otto Kuntze advised him to buy a microscope and to study the work of Mathias Jakob Schlieden on botany. He graduated in 1848 as doctor of philosophy with the thesis De forma et incremento stratorum crassiorum in plantarum cellula. He suggested that the plant cell wall growth occurred from the apposition from inside the cell not by adhesion from outside. He spent some time in London and Paris and joined the University of Berlin in 1851 as a privatdozent. His habilitation thesis was on the development of the oomycete of Saprolegnia ferax. In 1864 he succeeded Schlieden as professor of botany at the University of Jena. He taught cryptogamic botany and microscopic technique and his students included Eduard Strasburger. In 1868, Pringsheim's father died and he left an inheritance that allowed him to resign (partly due to poor health, thought to be asthma) and work in a private laboratory at home in Berlin. He encouraged several other researchers Wilhelm Pfeffer, Johannes Reinke, and Alexander Tschirch to conduct research in his private laboratory.

Pringsheim studied the structure of thallophytes and in 1855 he observed the movement of spermatozoids and their penetration into the egg. He examined sexual reproduction in the Saprolegniaceae. He continued studies on Spirogyra, Floridea, Vaucheria and Fucus. He then examined the reproductive structures of mosses and the Characeae. He continued work with the mosses and was able to confirm the alternation of asexual and sexual generations. He tried to propagate moss vegetatively from moss setae (sporophyte). He placed them on damp sand and observed that protonemal threads grew from them he got leafy moss (gametophytes) outgrowths. These were produced without gametic fusion and is now termed as apospory. He published his notes in November 1876 and this was independently observed by Christian Ernst Stahl just a few months later. Along with the French investigators Gustave Adolphe Thuret (1817–1875) and Jean-Baptiste Édouard Bornet (1828–1911), Pringsheim was a founder of studies on algae. Among his researches in this field may be mentioned those on Vaucheria (1855), the Oedogoniaceae (1855–1858), the Coleochaeteae (1860), Hydrodictyon (1861), and Pandorina (1869); the last-mentioned memoir bore the title Beobachtungen über die Paarung de Zoosporen. This was a discovery of fundamental importance; the conjugation of zoospores was regarded by Pringsheim, with good reason, as the primitive form of sexual reproduction. In a work on the course of morphological differentiation in the Sphacelariaceae (1873), he approached their evolution from the point of view of Carl Nägeli (1817–1891) rather than Darwin. He considered the increase in structural complexity to be a spontaneous morphological process unrelated to adaptive value. He worked on higher plants as well and took a special interest in the water fern Salvinia. From 1874 he was interested in plant physiology, examining carbon assimilation. He also suggested that chlorophyll-pigment acted as a screen, with the main function of protecting the protoplasm from light-rays which would neutralize its assimilative activity by stimulating too active respiration. This view has not been accepted as offering an adequate explanation of the phenomena.

Pringsheim founded in 1858, and edited until his death, the journal Jahrbücher für wissenschaftliche Botanik, which still bears his name. He was also founder, in 1882, and first president, of the German Botanical Society. He was involved in the establishment of the German marine biology institute on Heligoland. Pringsheim was aware of the algal diversity of the region and wanted botany to be an area of research there. His daughters donated 25000 reichmarks to establish a sea museum in Heligoland. The Nathanael Pringsheim Foundation was established in 1992. Pringsheim married Henriette Guradze, daughter of an industrialist in Oppeln, in 1851 and they had three surviving children. He suffered from poor health and frequently made trips to the Riviera and northern France. He was active in the liberal politics of Berlin for some time. After his death, his library was donated to the Berlin botanical garden and some duplicates went to Heligoland. One of his son-in-laws was Albert Ladenburg who became a noted chemist. A niece Martha Liebermann was married to the artist Max Liebermann. She committed suicide due to avoid deportation to Theresienstadt by the Nazis. A grand-daughter Irene Sara Carst who helped assist Jewish children escape to England died in Trawniki labor camp.

In 1866 botanist Stephan Schulzer von Müggenburg erected the genus Pringsheimia Schulzer 1866 (a genus of fungi, in Saccotheciaceae family) named in his honour. Then in 1920 Franz Xaver Rudolf von Höhnel published in Ann. Mykol. vol.18 Pringsheimiella, which is a genus of green algae, in the family Ulvellaceae. In 1939, John Nathaniel Couch published Pringsheimiella (a genus of fungi).

The standard botanical author abbreviation Pringsh. is applied to species he described.
