= Herbert Weichmann =

German lawyer and politician (1896–1983)

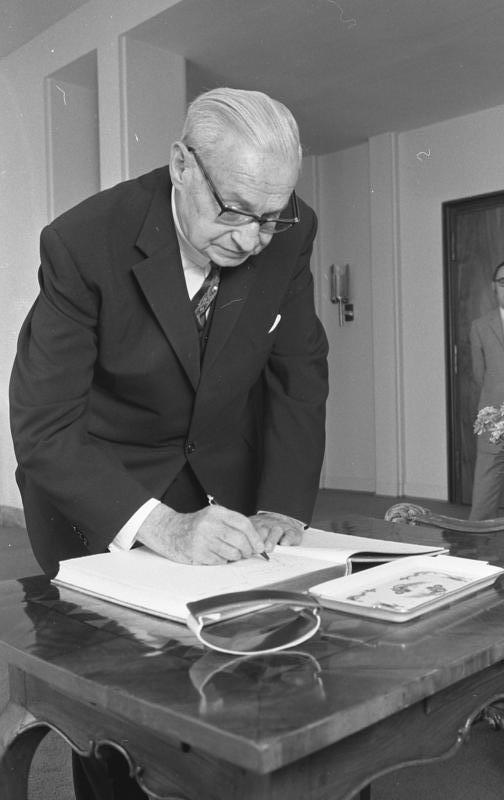
- Weichmann in 1971

First Mayor of Hamburg
- In office 9 June 1965 – 9 June 1971
- President: Heinrich Lübke; Gustav Heinemann
- Chancellor: Ludwig Erhard; Kurt Georg Kiesinger; Willy Brandt
- Preceded by: Paul Nevermann
- Succeeded by: Peter Schulz

President of the German Bundesrat
- In office 1 November 1968 – 31 October 1969
- President: Heinrich Lübke; Gustav Heinemann
- Chancellor: Kurt Georg Kiesinger; Willy Brandt
- Preceded by: Klaus Schütz
- Succeeded by: Franz-Josef Röder

Personal details
- Born: 23 February 1896 Landsberg in Oberschlesien, Province of Silesia, German Empire
- Died: 9 October 1983 (aged 87) Hamburg, West Germany
- Party: Social Democratic Party of Germany
- Spouse(s): Elsbet, née Griesinger (1928) (b. 1910, d. 1988)
- Education: Silesian Friedrich Wilhelm University

Herbert Weichmann (23 February 1896 – 9 October 1983) was a German lawyer and politician (Social Democratic Party) and First Mayor of Hamburg (1965–1971). In his position as mayor of Hamburg, he served as President of the Bundesrat (1968–1969).

== Life ==
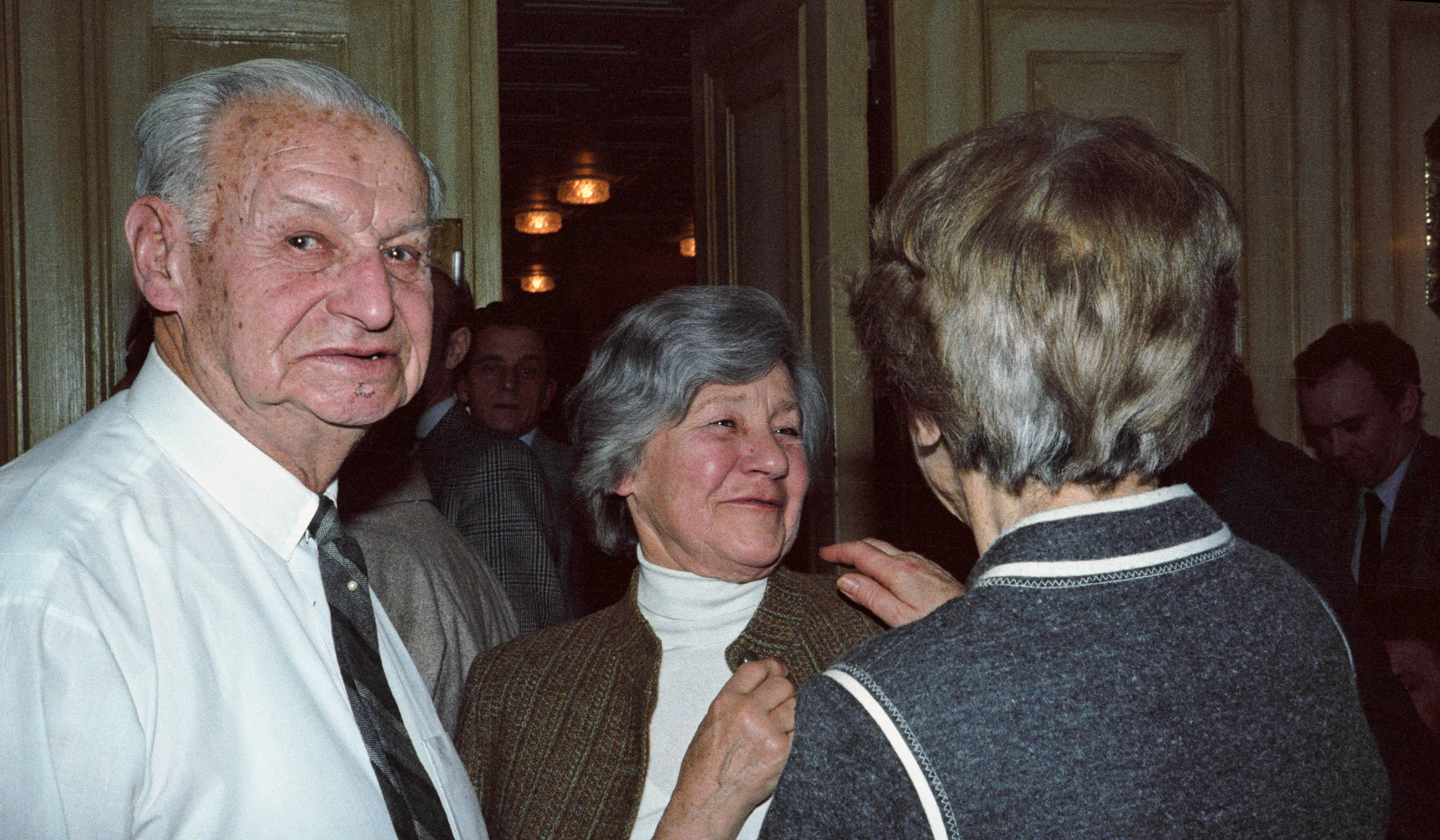
Weichmann with his wife, 1982

Weichmann was born in Landsberg, Upper Silesia, then part of the German Reich (now Gorzów Śląski, Poland), to a Jewish family of physicians. In 1914 he began to study medicine, but volunteered at the outbreak of the First World War in 1914. After the war Weichmann studied law at the Silesian Friedrich Wilhelm University, Breslau, and graduated (Dr. iur.) in 1922. In 1928 he married Elsbeth Greisinger and was appointed as liaison officer to Prime Minister of Prussia Otto Braun. After the takeover of power (1933) by the Nazi Party Weichmann fled first to Czechoslovakia, then to France—with a short term of imprisonment (1939–1940)—Spain, Portugal and later the United States. In 1948 he returned to Germany at the invitation of the mayor of Hamburg, Max Brauer, and started his political career there. In 1956 he became a member of the faculty of the University of Hamburg. Weichmann died in Hamburg and is buried at Ohlsdorf Cemetery. Weichmann's son lived in Canada.

== Political career ==
Weichmann started his political career on a Soldiers' council (German: Soldatenrat) in 1918. In 1920, he became a member of the SPD. From 1948 until 1957, he was President of the Hamburg Court of Auditors. In 1957, he was appointed as Senator of Finance, a position he held until his election as First Mayor of Hamburg on 16 June 1965. Weichmann resigned in 1971. He was considered a potential candidate to be the next President of Germany, but he did not put himself forward.

== Honours ==
In 1964 Weichmann was appointed as an honorary professor at the University of Hamburg. He was awarded Honorary Citizenship of Hamburg in 1971. In 1989 the non-profit organization Herbert und Elsbeth Weichmann-Stiftung was founded; its goal is to remember and commemorate the activities of the democratic opposition in exile against Hitler, and to promote academic works about political exile. In Uhlenhorst quarter a street was named Herbert-Weichmann-Straße. In 2007 the Herbert Weichmann medallion was granted for the first time by the city of Hamburg, honoring "those—both Jewish and non-Jewish—who have contributed to Jewish life in Germany".

== Works ==
- Der Gesellschaft und dem Staat verpflichtet: einfache und schwierige Wahrheiten. (1980) Hamburg: A. Knaus. ISBN 3-8135-1443-9 (in German)
- Miterlebtes: Berichte aus 5 Jahrzehnten hamburg. Geschichte. (1979) Hamburg: Christians. ISBN 3-7672-0667-6 (in German)
- Gefährdete Freiheit: Aufruf zur streitbaren Demokratie. (1974) Hamburg: Hoffmann und Campe. ISBN 3-455-08120-7 (in German)

== Literature ==
- Regneri, Guenter. (2015) Herbert Weichmann: aus dem Bestehenden die Bausteine des Besseren entwickeln. Berlin: Hentrich & Hentrich. ISBN 978-3-95565-096-4 (in German)
- Bahnsen, Uwe. (2001) Die Weichmanns in Hamburg: ein Glücksfall für Deutschland. Hamburg: Christians. ISBN 3-7672-1360-5 (in German)
