= Neudorf =

Neudorf (German for "new village") may refer to:

== Places ==
=== Austria ===
- Neudorf bei Staatz, in the district of Mistelbach, Lower Austria
- Wiener Neudorf, in the district of Mödling, Lower Austria
- Neudorf bei Parndorf, in Burgenland
- Neudorf bei Passail, in Styria

=== Canada ===
- Neudorf, Saskatchewan, a town in the south east corner of the Canadian province of Saskatchewan

=== Czechia ===
- Nová Ves (Louny District), German name Neudorf, a village and municipality in Louny District in the Ústí nad Labem Region
- Nová Ves (Sokolov District), German name Neudorf, a village and municipality in Sokolov District in the Karlovy Vary Region
- Převýšov, German name Neudorf, a village and municipality located about 4 km west of Chlumec nad Cidlinou

=== France ===
- Neudorf (Strasbourg), a district in the south of Strasbourg
- Neudorf, German name of Village-Neuf, a municipality in the Haut-Rhin department

=== Germany ===
- Neudorf (Wächtersbach), a village on the Kinzig in Wächtersbach, Hesse
- Neudorf, Saxony-Anhalt, a town in the district of Harz in Saxony-Anhalt
- Neudorf, Sehmatal, a district of the municipality Sehmatal in Saxony
- Neudorf, a locality of Amorbach in northern Bavaria
- Neudorf, a locality of Pegnitz in northern Bavaria
- Graben-Neudorf, a town in the district of Karlsruhe in Baden-Württemberg
- Neudorf-Bornstein, a municipality in Schleswig-Holstein
- Kreba-Neudorf, a district of the municipality Kreba in eastern Saxony
- Neudorf/Spree, a district of the municipality Malschwitz in eastern Saxony
- Neudorf, a village of the municipality Neschwitz in eastern Saxony
- Neudorf, a village of the municipality Königswartha in eastern Saxony
- Neudorf, a district of the municipality Zeithain in eastern Saxony

=== Luxembourg ===
- Neudorf-Weimershof, a neighbourhood within the city of Luxembourg

=== New Zealand ===
- Neudorf, a former German settlement in Tasman District

=== Poland ===
- Ciecierzyn, Opole Voivodeship, German name Neudorf, a village in the administrative district of Gmina Byczyna, Kluczbork County, Opole Voivodeship
- Łozice, Koszalin County, German name Neudorf, a village in the administrative district of Gmina Bobolice, Koszalin County, West Pomeranian Voivodeship
- Nowa Wieś, Grudziądz County, German name Neudorf, a village in the administrative district of Gmina Grudziądz, Grudziądz County, Kuyavian-Pomeranian Voivodeship
- Nowa Wieś, Gmina Golub-Dobrzyń, German name Neudorf, a village in the administrative district of Gmina Golub-Dobrzyń, Golub-Dobrzyń County, Kuyavian-Pomeranian Voivodeship
- Nowa Wieś, Gmina Pleszew, German name Neudorf, a village in the administrative district of Gmina Pleszew, Pleszew County, Greater Poland Voivodeship
- Nowa Wieś, Iława County, German name Neudorf, a village in the administrative district of Gmina Iława, Iława County, Warmian-Masurian Voivodeshi
- Nowa Wieś, Kartuzy County, German name Neudorf, a village in the administrative district of Gmina Stężyca, Kartuzy County, Pomeranian Voivodeshi
- Nowa Wieś, Kościan County, German name Neudorf, a village in the administrative district of Gmina Śmigiel, Kościan County, Greater Poland Voivodeship
- Nowa Wieś Kłodzka, a village in the Lower Silesian Voivodeship formerly known as Neudorf
- Nowa Wieś Kwidzyńska, German name Neudorf, a village in the administrative district of Gmina Kwidzyn, Kwidzyn County, Pomeranian Voivodeship
- Nowa Wieś Legnicka, German name Neudorf, a village in the administrative district of Gmina Legnickie Pole, Legnica County, Lower Silesian Voivodeship
- Nowa Wieś Lubińska, German name Neudorf, a village in the administrative district of Gmina Polkowice, Polkowice County, Lower Silesian Voivodeship
- Nowa Wieś, Międzyrzecz County, German name Neudorf, a village in the administrative district of Gmina Bledzew, Międzyrzecz County, Lubusz Voivodeship
- Nowinki, Gmina Nowy Dwór Gdański, German name Neudorf, a village in the administrative district of Gmina Nowy Dwór Gdański, Nowy Dwór County, Pomeranian Voivodeship
- Nowa Wieś, Gmina Wronki, German name Neudorf, a village in the administrative district of Gmina Nowy Dwór Wronki, Szamotuły County, Greater Poland Voivodeship
- Nowa Wieś Oleska, German name Neudorf, a village in the administrative district of Gmina Gorzów Śląski, Olesno County, Opole Voivodeship
- Nowa Wieś Prudnicka, German name Neudorf, a village in the administrative district of Gmina Biała, Prudnik County, Opole Voivodeship
- Nowa Wieś, Wągrowiec County, German name Neudorf, a settlement in the administrative district of Gmina Wągrowiec, Wągrowiec County, Greater Poland Voivodeship
- Nowa Wieś, Wschowa County, German name Neudorf, a village in the administrative district of Gmina Wschowa, Wschowa County, Lubusz Voivodeship
- Polska Nowa Wieś, former German name Polnisch Neudorf
- Prosinko, German name Neudorf, a village in the administrative district of Gmina Czaplinek, Drawsko County, West Pomeranian Voivodeship
- Siemiradz, Lubusz Voivodeship, former German name Neudorf, a settlement in the administrative district of Gmina Trzebiel, Żary County, Lubusz Voivodeship

=== Romania ===
- Neudorf, Arad (Temesújfalu), a village in Zăbrani Commune, Arad County
- Ohaba, German name Neudorf, a commune in Alba County
- Certeze, German name Neudorf, Satu Mare County
- Neudorf, the German name for Ciceu-Corabia village, Ciceu-Mihăiești Commune, Bistriţa-Năsăud County
- Neudorf, the German name for Nou Săsesc village, Laslea Commune, Sibiu County
- Neudorf, the German name for Nou village, Roșia, Sibiu Commune, Sibiu County

=== Russia ===
- Noidorf (Нойдорф), industrial and business park in the special economic zone in Strelna near Saint Petersburg

=== Serbia ===
- Neudorf, the former name of the village currently named Bačko Novo Selo

=== Slovenia ===
- Nova Vas, Preddvor, German name Neudorf, in the Upper Carniola region
- Nova Vas pri Mokricah, German name Neudorf, in the Municipality of Brežice
- Nova Vas, Ivančna Gorica, German name Neudorf, a village in the hills south of Višnja Gora in the Municipality of Ivančna Gorica
- Zavrh, Litija, German name Neudorf, a settlement north of Dole in the Municipality of Litija

=== Switzerland ===
- Neudorf, Lucerne, in the Canton of Lucerne

=== Ukraine ===
- Nove Selo, Drohobych Raion, named Neudorf from 1783 to 1938

== People with the surname ==
- Darryl Neudorf (born 1964), Canadian musician, record producer and audio engineer
- Nathan Neudorf (fl. from 2019), Canadian politician from Alberta
- Tara (von Neudorf) (born 1974), Romanian artist

== See also ==
- Neuendorf (disambiguation)
