= Endoderma =

Scientific classification
- Kingdom: Plantae
- Division: Chlorophyta
- Class: Ulvophyceae
- Order: Ulvales
- Family: Ulvellaceae
- Genus: Endoderma; Lagerheim, 1883

Type species
- Endoderma basicladiae

Species
- Endoderma basicladiae

Genus of algae

Endoderma is a genus of green algae, in the family Ulvellaceae.
