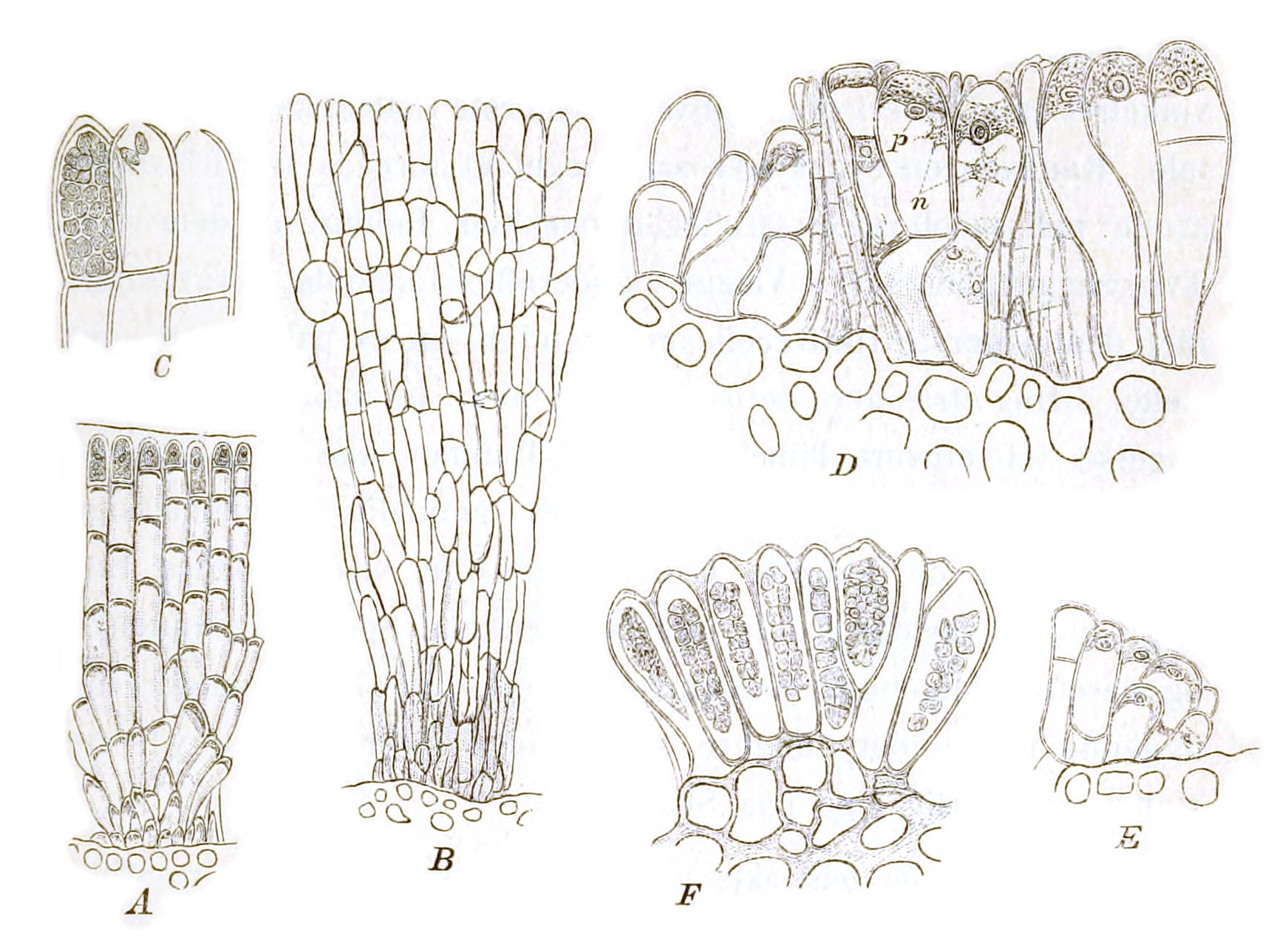
- Pseudopringsheimia confluens

Scientific classification
- Kingdom: Plantae
- Division: Chlorophyta
- Class: Ulvophyceae
- Order: Ulvales
- Family: Ulvellaceae
- Genus: Pseudopringsheimia; Wille, 1909

Species
- Pseudopringsheimia confluens; Pseudopringsheimia reinkei

= Pseudopringsheimia =

Genus of algae

Pseudopringsheimia is a genus of green algae, in the family Ulvellaceae.
