= Altona Main Cemetery =

Cemetery in Hamburg, Germany

Coordinates: 53.586°N 9.888°E

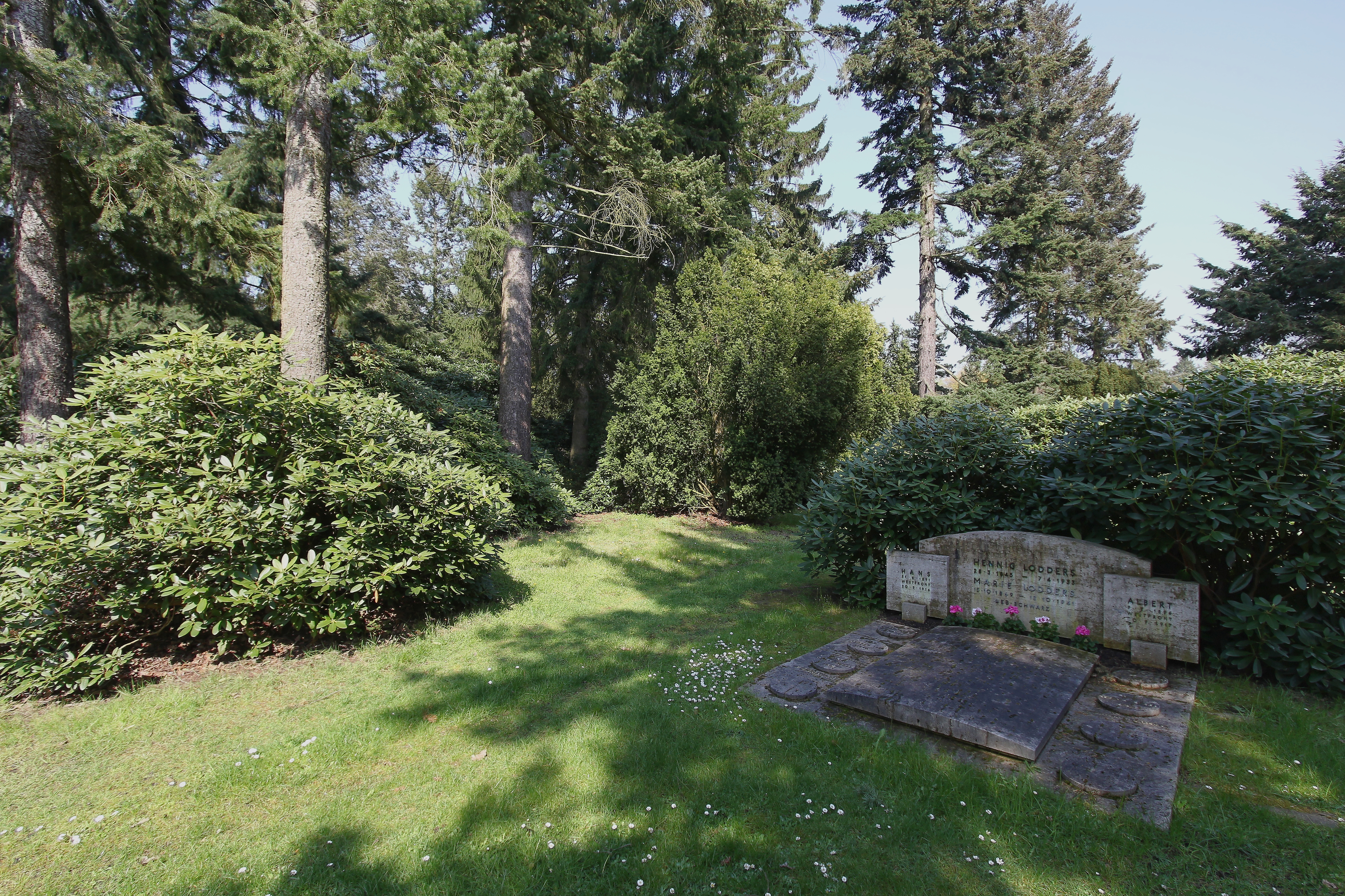
Grave in the wooded part of the cemetery

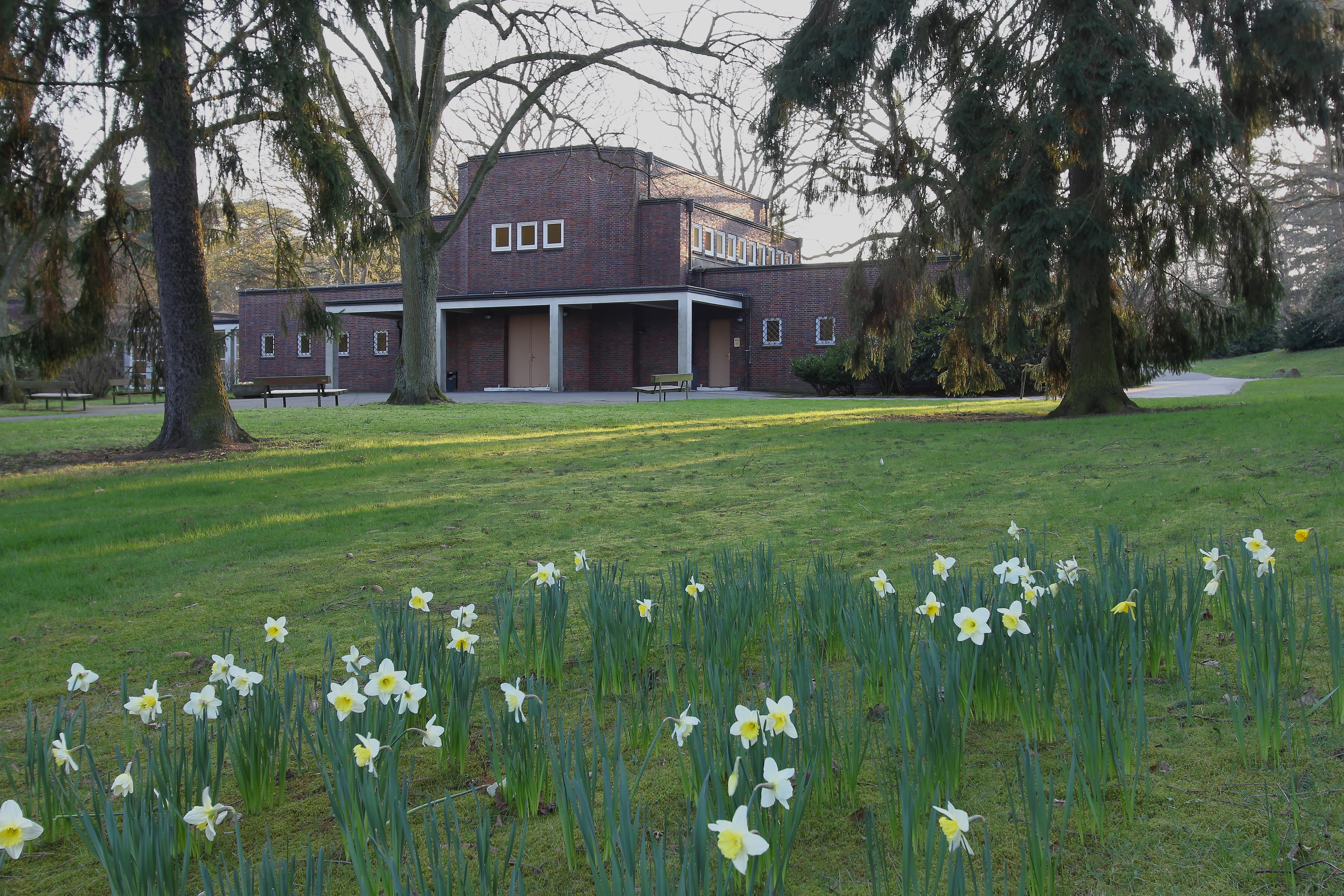
Chapel

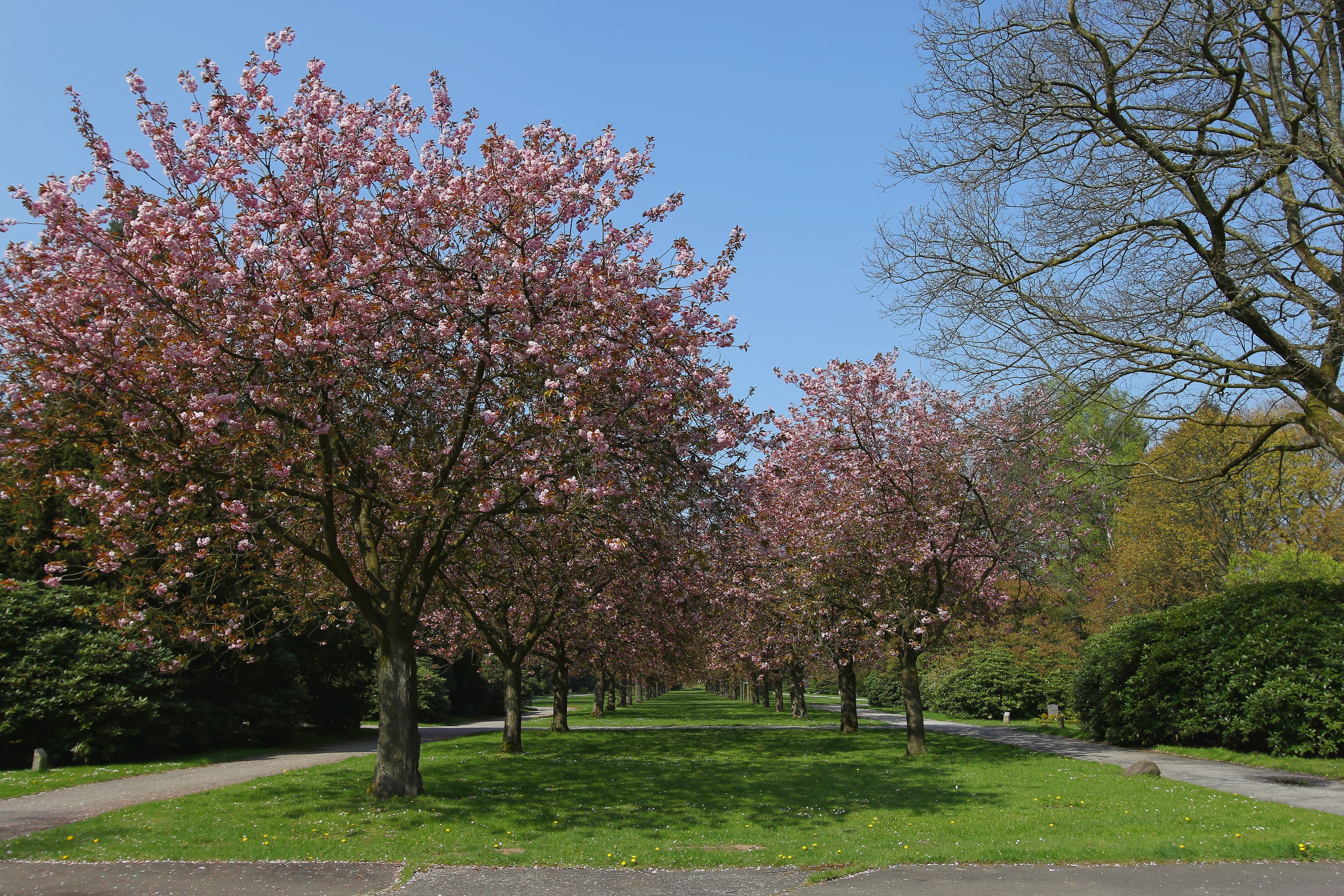
Main avenue with almond blossom

Altona Main Cemetery (German: Hauptfriedhof or Friedhof Altona) is located at Stadiongasse 5, Bahrenfeld, Altona, in north-western Hamburg, Germany and, with an area of 63 hectares, is the fourth largest burial ground in the city and surrounding area. It has been a protected site since the revision of the Hamburg Monument Protection Law (Hamburger Denkmalschutzgesetz) in 2013.

== History ==
The main cemetery of Altona was planned from 1913 by Ferdinand Tutenberg, Director of Gardens of the then District of Altona. The new facility, designed as a central cemetery for the whole of Altona, was to replace the existing small church burial grounds and with its generous area of green to provide an appropriately contemporary element of town planning. Construction began in spring 1920; the first burial took place on 2 October 1923, even before the official opening on 1 November 1923. The address was given by the Mayor of Altona, Bernhard Schnackenburg, three months before his untimely death from typhus.

Tutenberg's plan was based on the concept of an "architectonic landscape" which would make possible a dignified burial even for the less well-off inhabitants of the town. To explain his intentions Tutenberg wrote in 1928: "A visitor to the dead will not have the view of rows of graves stretching away into the distance but through the smaller space of the little garden... will have the opportunity for inner composure". Thus a geometric and axial network of paths was laid out, the central axis of which was formed by the broad central avenue, now terminating in a monument honouring the fallen of World War II. To the west of this axis are alternating areas of park and woodland, and to the east the area for urn burials, laid out in concentric circles.

Most burials are marked by grave steles, whereby the desired homogeneity of appearance is attained. In the wooded section however there are also some elaborate burial walls or crosses. The site has a chapel and two nurseries for the cemetery gardener. The chapel was extended by Gustav Oelsner in 1926-27 by the addition of the rectangular arcade. A crematorium was originally planned, but was never built.

Up to 2012 more than 100,000 burials had taken place in the cemetery.

== The present ==
=== War graves ===
There are 1,856 war graves from World War II, mostly civilian casualties from the bombing of Altona, but also some graves of soldiers. The present arrangement dates from the end of the 1960s, when the dead whose graves had been scattered throughout the cemetery during the war were re-buried in one spot around a high cross; the soldiers' graves are directly next to it. The graves of the bombing victims are arranged in the shape of a cross. The gravestones are in the form of either standing crosses or flat stones. The soldiers' gravestones bear only an Iron Cross and the name of deceased, without any other decoration or even the dates of birth and death.

=== Roma and Sinti burials ===
A part of the cemetery is set aside for the graves of Roma and Sinti.

=== HSV cemetery ===
Since 2008 there has been in the north-east of the cemetery a special burial ground for supporters of the Hamburger SV (HSV): the Volksparkstadion lies directly over the road. For its construction inspiration was taken from the shape of a football stadium, with allusions to elements such as the stands, the goal and the field. Parts of the area have been laid with turf from the stadium ground itself.

=== Graves of notable people ===
- Max Brauer (1887 - 1973), Mayor of Altona
- Ferdinand Tutenberg (1874 - 1956), planner of the cemetery
- Bernhard Schnackenburg (1867 - 1924), Mayor of Altona
- Ernst Budzinski (1888 - 1951), actor
- Adolf Jäger (1889 - 1944), footballer
- Herbert Tobias (1924 - 1982), photographer
- Peter Rühmkorf (1929 - 2008), poet

== Future development ==
The cemetery has been run since its creation by the District of Altona. Integration into the central Hamburg cemetery administration is under discussion in the context of an administrative reform, but is regarded critically by the District of Altona.

== Photographs ==
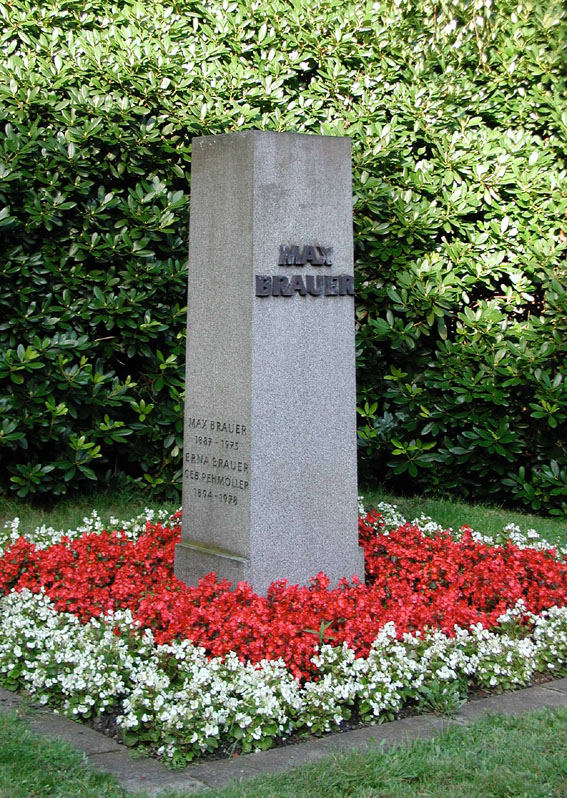
Grave of Max Brauer with a typical grave stele

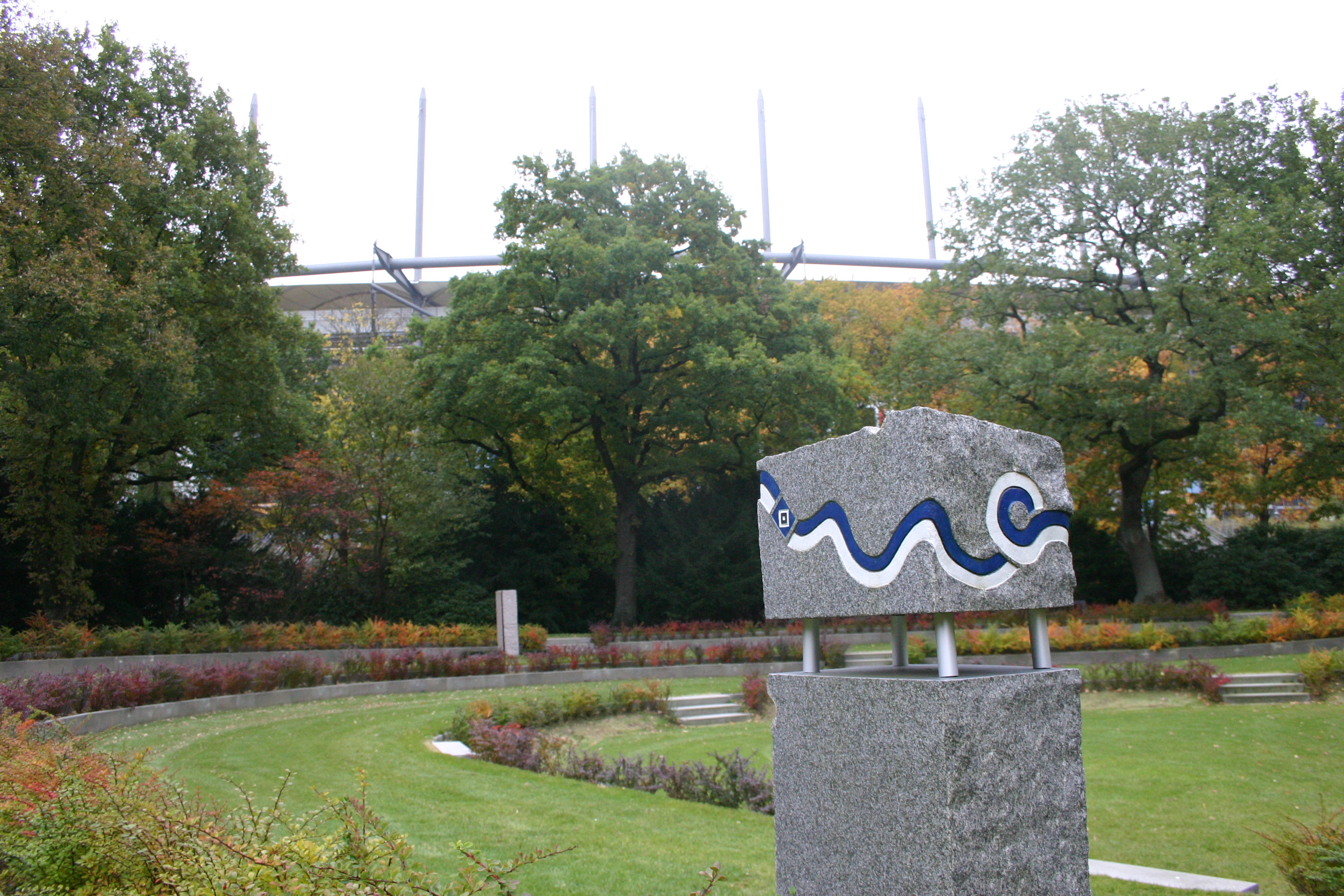
HSV burial ground, with the HSV stadium in the background

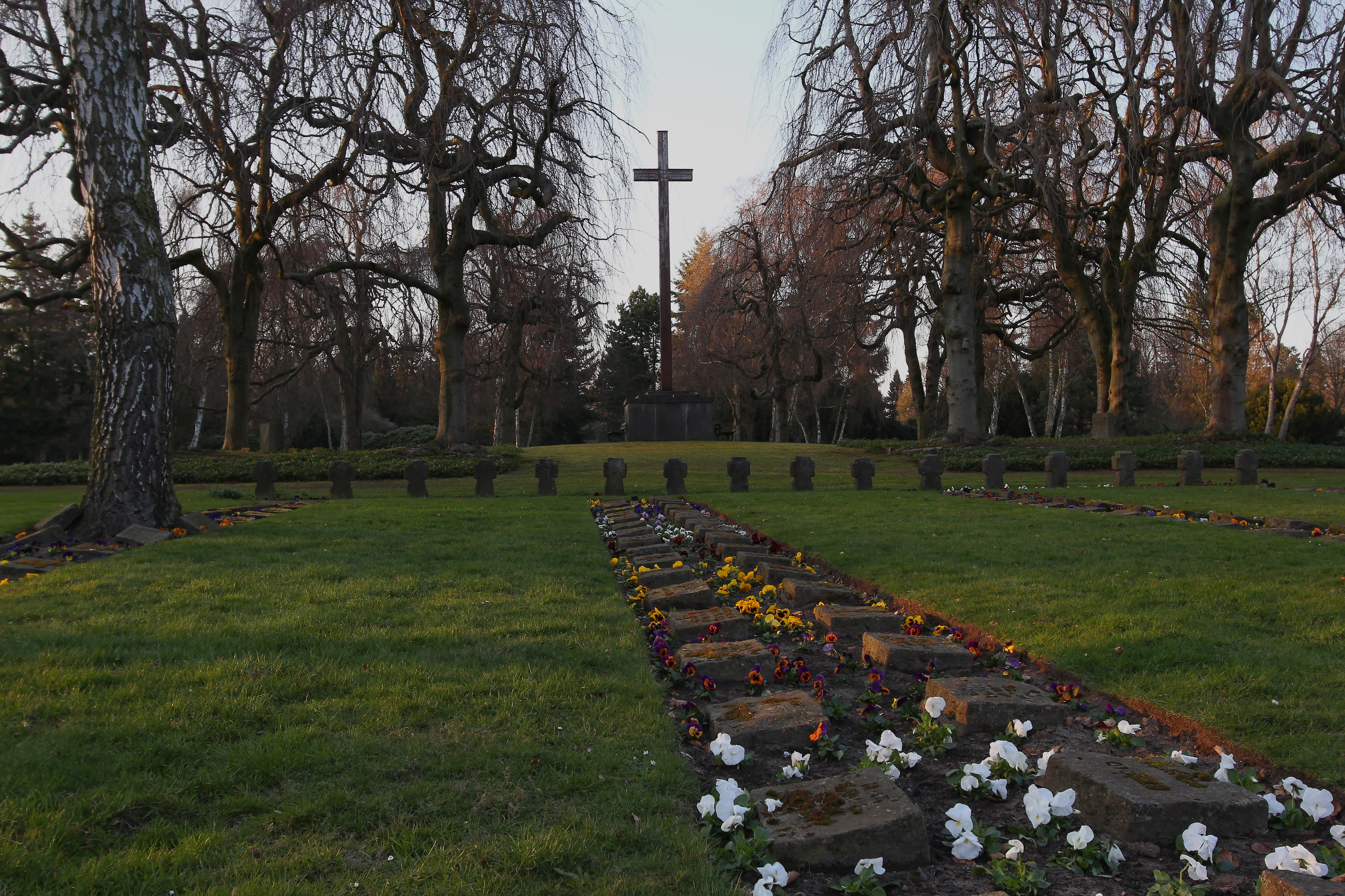
Central monument

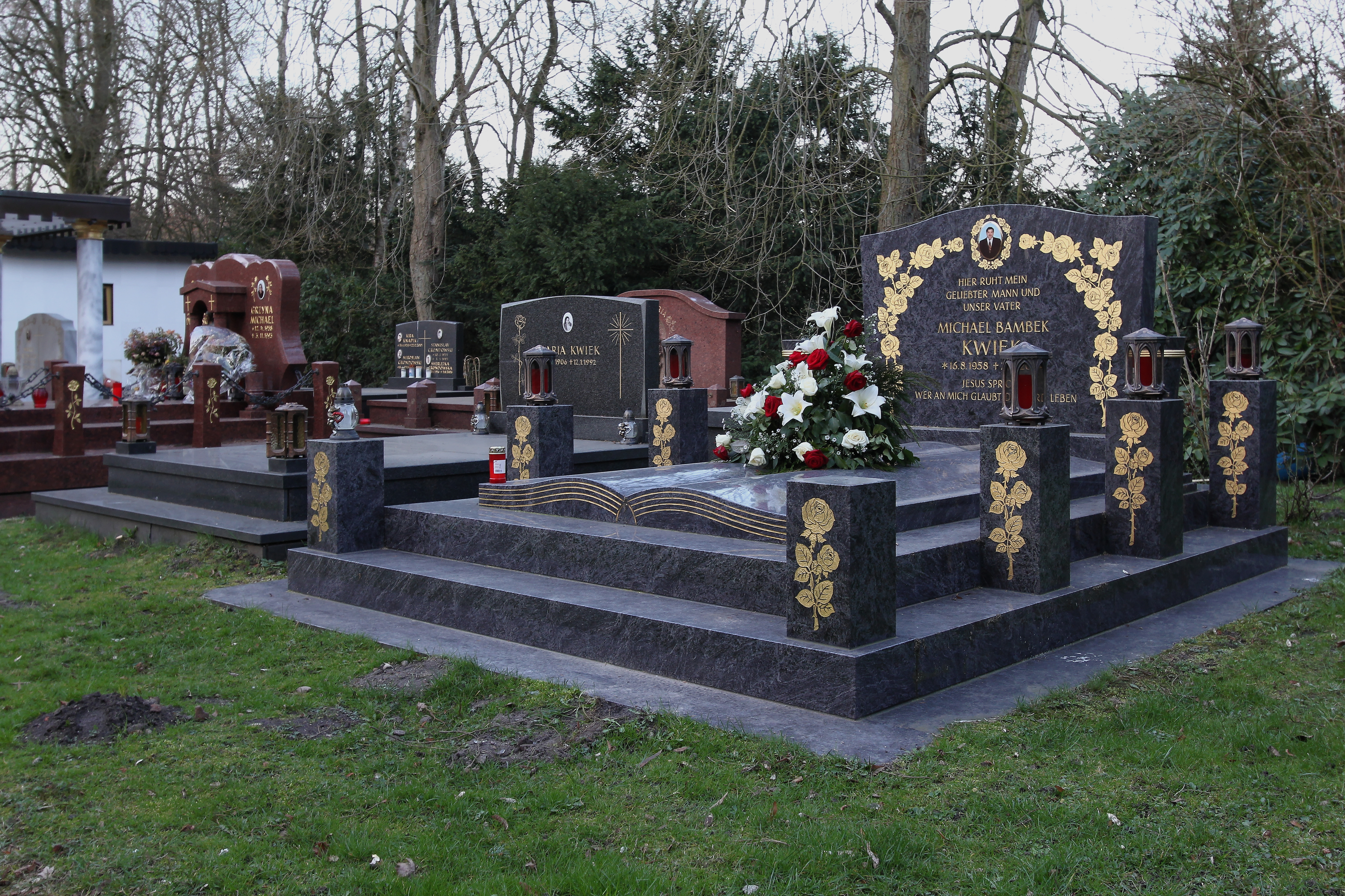
Roma graves

== Literature ==
- Barbara Leisner; Norbert Fischer (1994), Der Friedhofsführer (in German), Hamburg: Christians Verlag, pp. 90–93, ISBN 3-7672-1215-3
- Bezirksamt Altona (ed.). "Hauptfriedhof Altona - Ihr Wegweiser" (PDF) (in German).
- Bezirksamt Altona, ed. (2013), Zur Historie des Hauptfriedhofs Altona (in German), Hamburg
