= Jamy, Opole Voivodeship =

Jamy
- Village
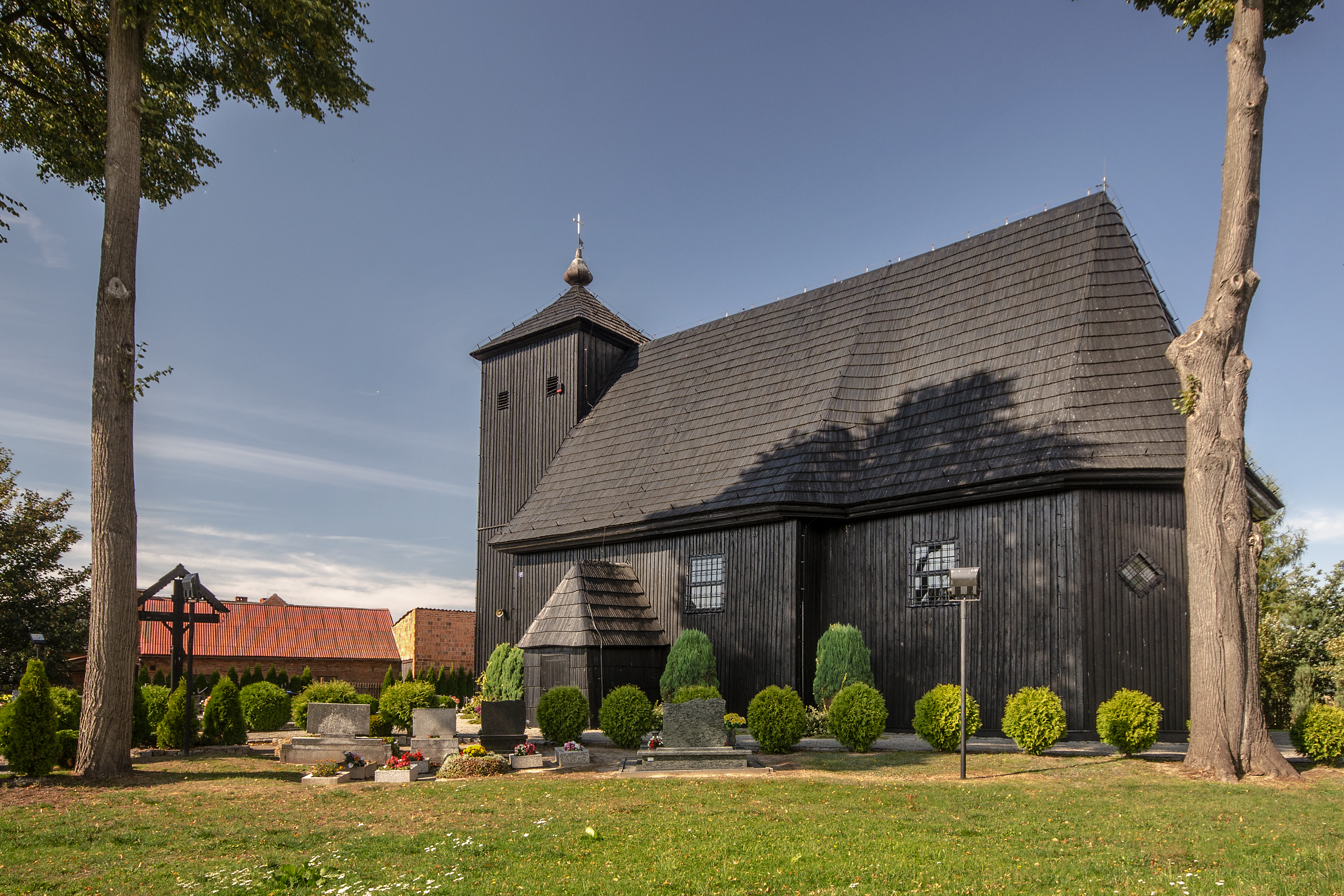
- Wooden church

- Location within Poland
- Coordinates: 50°58′N 18°22′E
- Country: Poland
- Voivodeship: Opole
- County: Olesno
- Gmina: Gorzów Śląski

Jamy [ˈjamɨ] (German Jamm) is a village in the administrative district of Gmina Gorzów Śląski, within Olesno County, Opole Voivodeship, in south-western Poland.
