= Pakoszów =

- Village
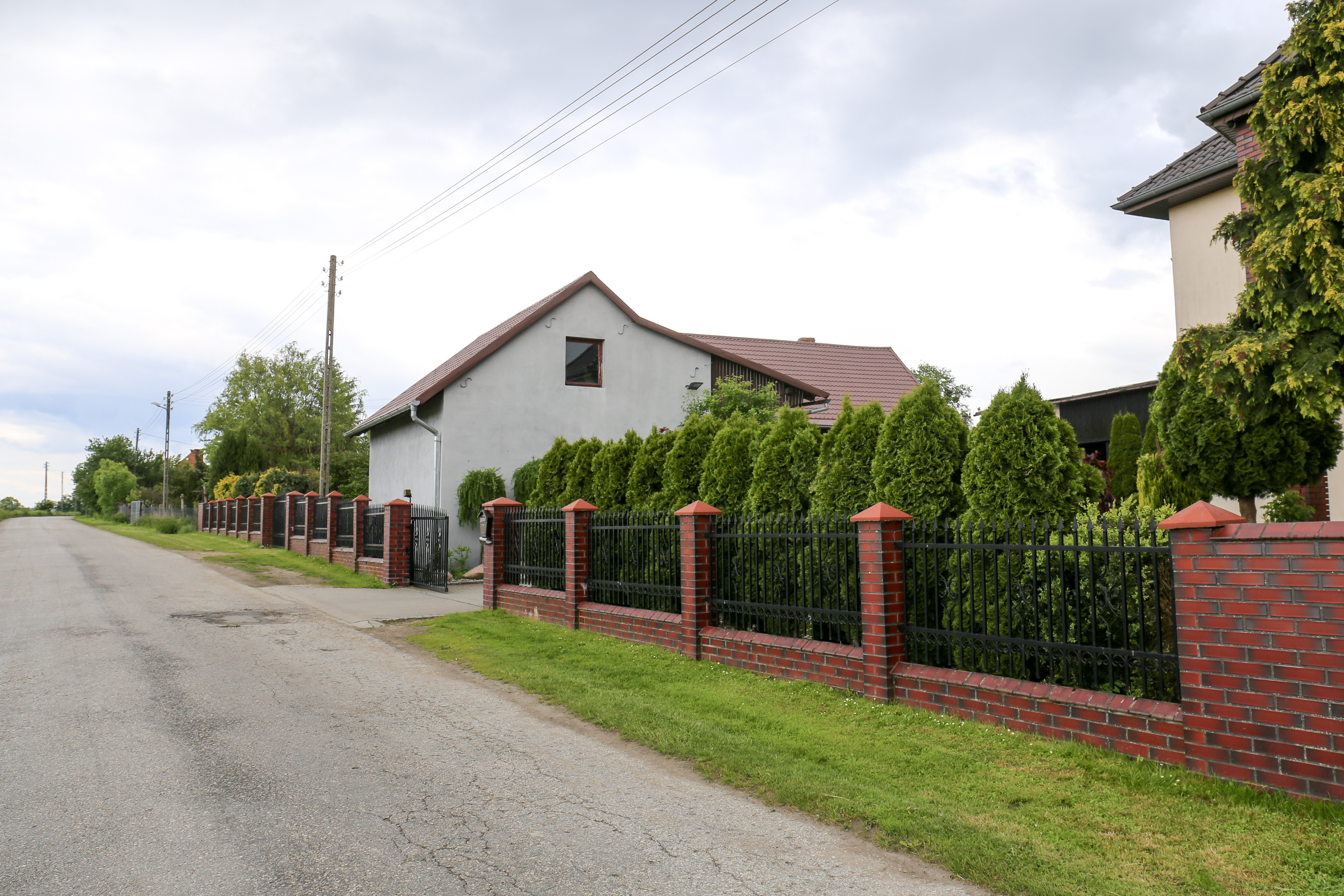

- Location within Poland
- Coordinates: 51°01′36″N 18°19′19″E
- Country: Poland
- Voivodeship: Opole
- County: Olesno
- Gmina: Gorzów Śląski

Pakoszów [paˈkɔʂuf] is a village in the administrative district of Gmina Gorzów Śląski, within Olesno County, Opole Voivodeship, in south-western Poland.
