= Neuendorf =

Neuendorf may refer to:

== Germany ==
- Babelsberg, Potsdam in Brandenburg, used to be two villages, Babelsberg and Neuendorf, until their official unification in 1907
- Neuendorf, Bavaria, in the district Main-Spessart, Bavaria
- Hohen Neuendorf, in the district Oberhavel, Brandenburg
- Neuendorf (Brück), a village near Brück in Brandenburg
- Neuendorf A, in the district Ostvorpommern, Mecklenburg-Vorpommern
- Neuendorf B, in the district Ostvorpommern, Mecklenburg-Vorpommern
- Neuendorf, Rhineland-Palatinate, in the district Bitburg-Prüm, Rhineland-Palatinate
- Kloster Neuendorf, in the district Altmarkkreis Salzwedel, Saxony-Anhalt
- Neuendorf am Damm, in the district Altmarkkreis Salzwedel, Saxony-Anhalt
- Neuendorf, Saxony-Anhalt, in the district Altmarkkreis Salzwedel, Saxony-Anhalt
- Neuendorf bei Elmshorn, in the district Steinburg, Schleswig-Holstein
- Neuendorf-Sachsenbande, in the district Steinburg, Schleswig-Holstein

== Poland ==
- Przęsocin, a village north of Szczecin formerly known by the German name Neuendorf
- Piaseczno, Gmina Banie, a village south of Szczecin formerly known by the German name Neuendorf
- Wisełka, formerly Neuendorf, a town on the island of Wolin
- Jarosławki, West Pomeranian Voivodeship, formerly Neuendorf bei Massow

== Russia ==
- Rzhevskoye Microdistrict, part of Kaliningrad, formerly known by the German name Adlig Neuendorf

== Switzerland ==
- Neuendorf, Switzerland, in the canton of Solothurn

== See also ==
- Neudorf (disambiguation)
