= Skrońsko =

- Village
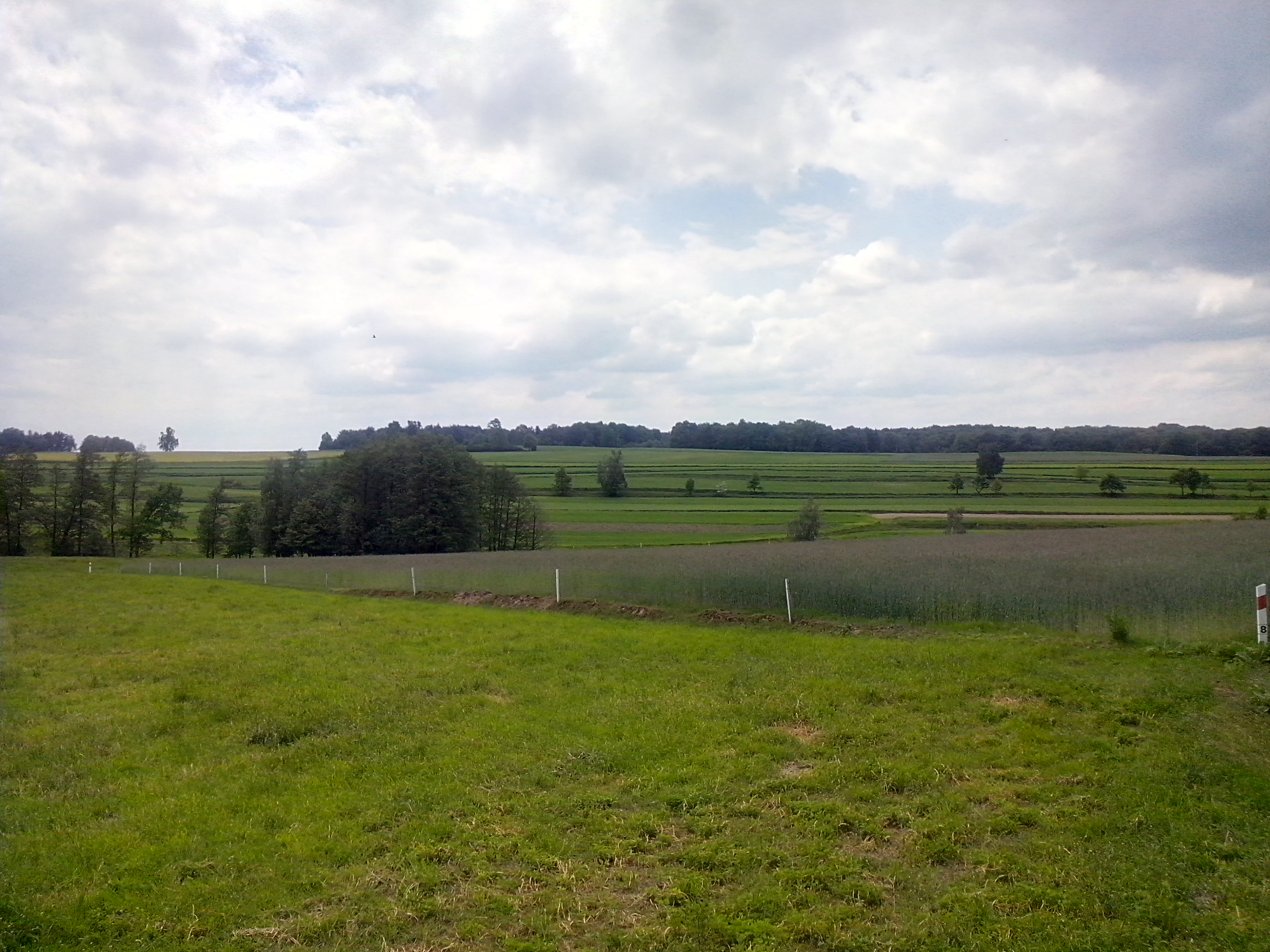

- Location within Poland
- Coordinates: 50°58′19″N 18°27′29″E
- Country: Poland
- Voivodeship: Opole
- County: Olesno
- Gmina: Gorzów Śląski

Skrońsko [ˈskrɔɲskɔ] is a village in the administrative district of Gmina Gorzów Śląski, within Olesno County, Opole Voivodeship, in south-western Poland.
