= Paul Nevermann =

German politician (1902–1979)

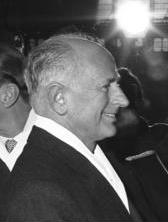
- Nevermann in 1961

First Mayor of Hamburg
- In office 1 January 1961 – 9 June 1965
- President: Heinrich Lübke
- Chancellor: Konrad Adenauer; Ludwig Erhard
- Preceded by: Max Brauer
- Succeeded by: Herbert Weichmann

Personal details
- Born: 5 February 1902 Klein Flottbek, Germany
- Died: 22 March 1979 (aged 77) Puerto de la Cruz, Tenerife, Spain
- Party: Social Democratic Party (SPD)

Paul Nevermann (5 February 1902 – 22 March 1979) was a German politician, member of the Social Democratic Party (SPD) and First Mayor of Hamburg (1961–1965).

== Early life and education ==
Nevermann was born in Klein Flottbek (a then independent village in the Pinneberg district now a neighborhood in Hamburg's quarter Nienstedten). He studied law and after his graduation Nevermann worked for the Hamburg labor office, but was fired 1933 as a member of the SPD by the Nazi government.

== Political life ==
He joined the SPD in 1920. In the aftermath of the 20 July plot of 1944 he was arrested. After World War II he became Senator of Hamburg. From 1950 to 1953, Nevermann was Second Mayor of Hamburg and as a successor of Max Brauer he was elected as First Mayor on 1 January 1961. During his term in office the North Sea flood of 1962 and the state visits of Charles de Gaulle (1963) and Elizabeth II (1965) were major events in Hamburg. During the visit of Elizabeth II the breakup with his wife became public and after a media campaign by the newspapers of Axel Springer Verlag Nevermann resigned in 1965.

Nevermann died in Puerto de la Cruz, Tenerife, Spain.
