= Krzyżańcowice =

- Village
- Location within Poland
- Coordinates: 51°4′N 18°25′E
- Country: Poland
- Voivodeship: Opole
- County: Olesno
- Gmina: Gorzów Śląski
- Elevation: 42 m (138 ft)
- Population: 220

Krzyżańcowice [kʂɨʐaɲt͡sɔˈvit͡sɛ] is a village in the administrative district of Gmina Gorzów Śląski, within Olesno County, Opole Voivodeship, in south-western Poland.
