= List of honorary citizens of Hamburg =

Hamburg greater coat of arms used by the Hamburg Senate.

The honorary citizen award (German: Ehrenbürgerrecht) is the highest decoration of Hamburg, Germany. The awards have been given sporadically since 1813, originally only to non-Hamburg citizens (with one exception, Johannes Brahms in 1889) "to make them as one of us" (um sie zu einem der unseren zu machen). Since 1948, it has been extended to Hamburg citizens as well.

The awards are given by the Senate of Hamburg, and since 1848 the state parliament (Hamburgische Bürgerschaft) is asked to confirm the honor. It can also be revoked (as in the case of Adolf Hitler and Hermann Göring), and gives no rights or duty.

== Honorary Citizens of the Free and Hanseatic City of Hamburg ==
Listed by year of award:

Date	Name	Notes
1813	Friedrich Karl von Tettenborn (1778–1845)	Russian Colonel and diplomat "Because the Lord has guided the restoration of the independence of Hamburg so fortunate and carried out the liberation of the Napoleonic occupation forces."
1816	Gebhard Leberecht von Blücher (1742–1819)	Prussian field marshal "The prince had stated to the Mayor, that it would be very glad to be rewarded with the citizenship."
1826	August Otto Graf Grote (1747–1830)	Prussian Secret Council and diplomat to Hamburg "On the recommendation of Counselor Büscher."
1834	James Colquhoun (1780–1855)	Hanseatic Consul General to London "On the recommendation of Dr. Abendroth in terms of special achievements."
1838	Georg Michael Gramlich (1795–1880)	Merchant, Hanseatic diplomat to Venezuela "Closure of a friendship, trade and navigation treaty with Venezuela on 27 May 1837."
1843	Johann Smidt (1773–1857)	Mayor of Bremen "Acknowledging the assistance after the Great Fire of Hamburg."
1843	Eduard Heinrich von Flottwell (1786–1865)	Prussian Secret Council "Acknowledging the assistance after the Great Fire."
1843	Conrad Daniel Graf von Blücher-Altona (1764–1845)	Danish Secret Council and President of the city of Altona "Acknowledging the assistance after the Great Fire."
1843	Heinrich Christoph Gottfried von Struve (1772–1851)	Russian Secret Council and diplomat to the Hanseatic cities "On the occasion of his 50th anniversary o service and for his efforts in the promotion of science (founder of the science museum in Hamburg)."
1871	Otto von Bismarck (1815–1898)	Chancellor of the German Empire "Services for the reborn and united German Fatherland"
1871	Helmuth Karl Bernhard, Graf von Moltke (1800–1891)	Prussian General "Services for the reborn and united German Fatherland"
1886	Gustav Christian Schwabe (1813–1897)	Merchant in London "Gift of 128 paintings to the Kunsthalle"
1889	Johannes Brahms (1833–1897)	Composer, the only Hamburg resident before 1948 "Through the outstanding works brought honor and glory to his native town"
1901	Alfred Graf von Waldersee (1832–1904)	Prussian field marshal "Activity in maintaining world peace."
1917	Paul von Hindenburg (1847–1934)	Prussian field marshal "Grateful reverence of the victorious and glorious commander."
1948	Henry Everling (1873–1960)	Senator of Hamburg "Contributions to the common good (consumer cooperatives)."
1950	Adolph Schönfelder (1875–1966)	President of the Hamburg Parliament and First Mayor of Hamburg "Contributions to the common good and constructive cooperation between the ruling majority and opposition."
1960	Max Brauer (1887–1973)	First Mayor of Hamburg "Contributions to the common good."
1971	Herbert Weichmann (1896–1983)	First Mayor of Hamburg "Contributions to the common good."
1978	Herbert Dau (1911–2000)	President of the Hamburg Parliament "Contributions to the common good."
1983	Helmut Schmidt (1918–2015)	German chancellor "For his statesmanship and great contributions to the common good of Hamburg."
1985	Ida Ehre (1900–1989)	Actress and director "Outstanding contributions to the intellectual and cultural reconstruction of our country and the city of Hamburg."
1986	Herbert Wehner (1906–1990)	Member of the Bundestag "Has made a contribution to the reconstruction of our country and our city of Hamburg."
1986	Gerd Bucerius (1906–1996)	Politician, journalist, and employer "Has shaped the history of media and great contribution to our country and our city of Hamburg."
1991	Kurt A. Körber (1909–1992)	Employer and founder "Outstanding contribution to the Federal Republic of Germany, the reconstruction of Hamburg and the promotion of science and culture."
1991	Alfred Toepfer (1894–1993)	Merchant and founder "Outstanding contribution to the Federal Republic of Germany, the reconstruction of Hamburg and the promotion of science and culture."
1993	Rudolf Augstein (1923–2002)	Publisher and journalist "Outstanding contribution to Hamburg as the media capital of Germany."
1999	Marion Gräfin Dönhoff (1909–2002)	Publisher and publicist "Extraordinary contributions to freedom, justice and human rights."
2001	Siegfried Lenz (1925–2014)	Writer "Has contributed with his literary work for the renewal and recognition of Germany in the spirit of humanism."
2003	Uwe Seeler (1936–2022)	The first sports person receiving the honorary citizenship.
2005	Hannelore and Helmut Greve	Major figures in construction sector; also patrons and sponsors of cultural establishments.
2007	John Neumeier	The first artist to receive the honorary citizenship and the first foreign born.
2009	Loki Schmidt (1919–2010)	Contributions to preservation of endangered plants.

== Revoked ==
- 1933 Adolf Hitler (1889–1945) revoked 1945
- 1937 Hermann Göring (1893–1946) revoked 1945
