= Syncoryne =

Scientific classification
- Clade: Viridiplantae
- Division: Chlorophyta
- Class: Ulvophyceae
- Order: Ulvales
- Family: Ulvellaceae
- Genus: Syncoryne; R. Nielsen & P.M. Pedersen, 1977
- Species: S. reinkei

Binomial name
- Syncoryne reinkei R. Nielsen & P.M. Pedersen, 1977

Genus of algae

Syncoryne is a genus of green algae, containing a single species, Syncoryne reinkei. It is in the family Ulvellaceae.
