= Pawłowice Gorzowskie =

Pawłowice
- Village
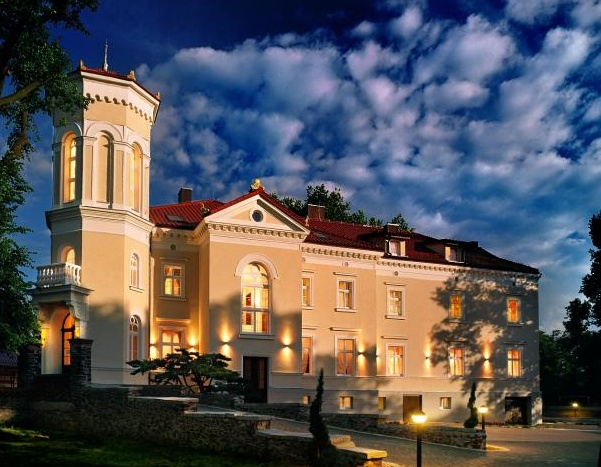
- Palace

- Location within Poland
- Coordinates: 51°0′15″N 18°23′48″E
- Country: Poland
- Voivodeship: Opole
- County: Olesno
- Gmina: Gorzów Śląski
- Population: 480

Pawłowice [pavwɔˈvit͡sɛ ɡɔˈʐɔfskʲɛ] is a village in the administrative district of Gmina Gorzów Śląski, within Olesno County, Opole Voivodeship, in south-western Poland.
