= Herbert Tobias =

German photographer (1924–1982)

Herbert Tobias (14 December 1924 – 17 August 1982) was a German photographer who first became well known for his fashion photography during the 1950s. His portrait studies, his photographs of Russia during World War II and his homoerotic pictures of men are all of artistic value. He was one of the first well-known people in Germany to die from AIDS.

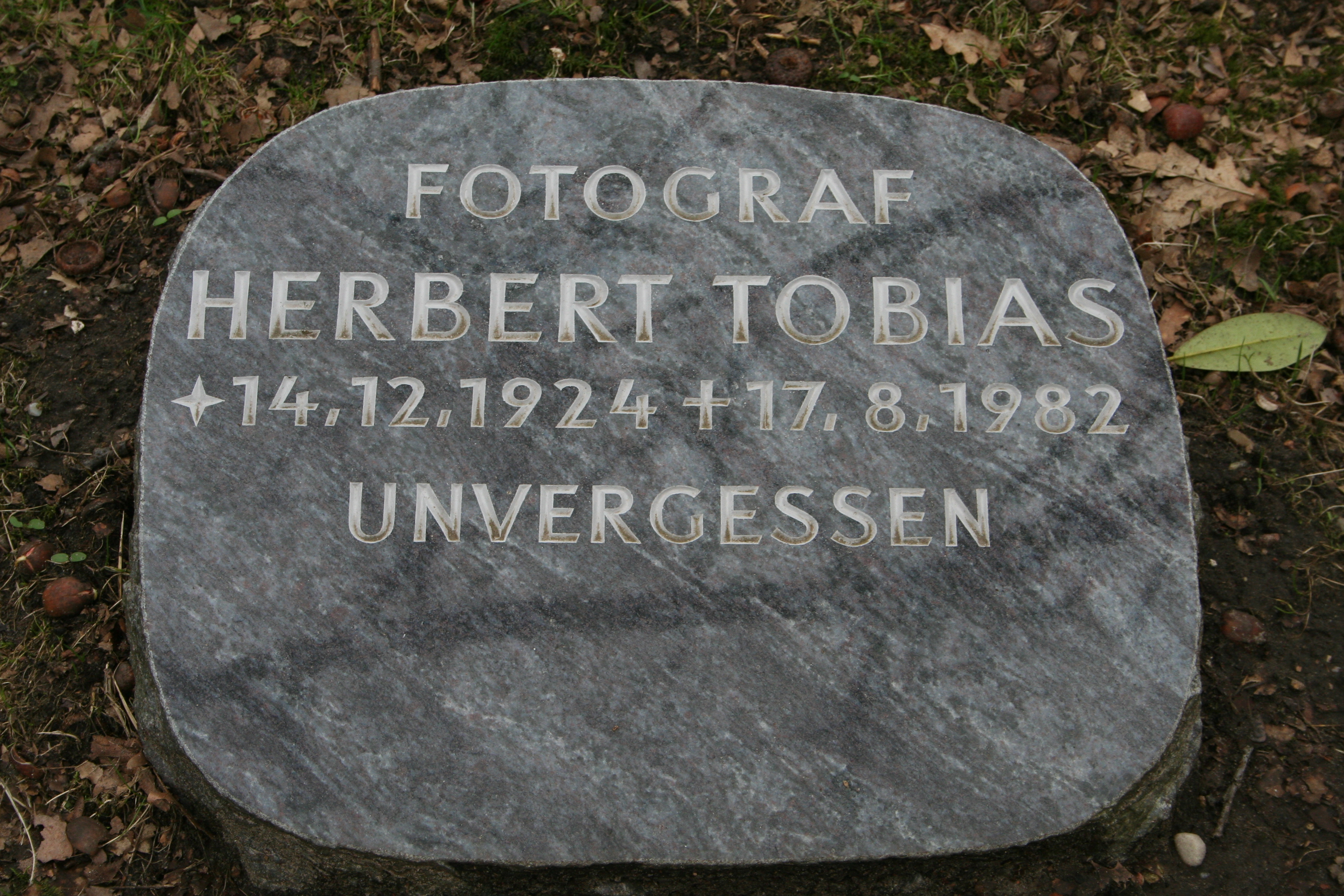
Grave of Herbert Tobias

== Life ==
Herbert Tobias was born in Dessau, the son of a gunmaker. He taught himself photography from the age of ten. His ambition was to become an actor, but the early death of his father in 1936 prevented him. After some time as a surveyor in Höxter Tobias was called up to the Wehrmacht in 1942 and sent to the Eastern Front, where he took his first significant photographs. Shortly before the end of the war he deserted and was captured by the Americans on the Western Front. He was released at the end of 1945.

After attending a stage school in Siegburg he obtained an engagement with the touring theatre company Niedersachsen-Bühne. In 1948, while staying in the area of Heidelberg he fell in love with, and began a relationship with, a civilian employee of the American Forces of Occupation. In 1950 both men were denounced under § 175 of the German Criminal Code, and moved to Paris.

There Tobias met the famous German photographer Willy Maywald, for whom he worked as a retoucher and who gave him his first contacts in the world of fashion. In 1953 Tobias' first pictures appeared in Vogue. In the same year, after resisting arrest during a police raid on a gay establishment, he was thrown out of France and returned to Heidelberg. From October 1953 his fashion photographs began to appear in West German magazines and in November, out of over 18,000 entrants, he won first prize in a highly lucrative competition for the front-page photo of the Frankfurter Illustrierten Zeitung.

After moving to West Berlin he had his first solo exhibition, in November 1954, and was praised by the critic Friedrich Luft. Also in Berlin he discovered the singer Nico, later famous with The Velvet Underground, and launched her career as a photographic model.

Through publication of his work in many high-class magazines Herbert Tobias had become by 1956 an established figure in West German fashion. His contacts in the worlds of fashion and film led in the following years to many photo-portraits of the famous, including Hildegard Knef, Zarah Leander, Valeska Gert, Amanda Lear, Klaus Kinski, Tatjana Gsovsky, Jean-Pierre Ponnelle and Andreas Baader.

However, from about 1960 Tobias found it increasingly difficult to deal with the discipline of the fashion world and his commissions fell off significantly. In 1966 he turned back to acting and took roles in theatre and film.

In 1969, after moving to Hamburg-Altona, he was only able to support himself with financial assistance from friends and from a few commissions for album covers from Deutsche Grammophon.

From 1972 his pictures started to appear in various gay magazines, particularly in him.

In 1981 there were highly praised exhibitions of his work in Amsterdam and Berlin. This late recognition and the planning of a book of photos caused him to have his old negatives copied and to caption them.

He fell seriously ill in February 1982 and died on 17 August of the same year, one of the first high-profile victims of AIDS in Germany. He was buried in Altona Cemetery; in 2007 his grave was declared an Ehrengrab ("grave of honour") by the Hamburg Senate.

Tobias bequeathed his photographic estate to the Berlinische Galerie (Landesmuseum für Moderne Kunst, Fotografie und Architektur), which gave his work a large retrospective from May to August 2008, with 200 exhibits, also displayed in 2009 in the Deichtorhallen in Hamburg.

== Literature ==
=== Books and exhibition catalogues ===
- Blicke und Begehren: Der Fotograf Herbert Tobias (1924–1982), ed. Ulrich Domröse, Steidl, Göttingen 2008. ISBN 978-3-86521-605-2
- Fotografien aus der Sammlung Pali Meller Marcovicz, Aachen 1996. ISBN 978-3-89086-813-4
- Fotografien 1950–1980 (Katalog zur Ausstellung in der FotoGalerie Volker Janssen zum 70. Geburtstag von Herbert Tobias), ed. Hans Eppendorfer, Berlin 1994. ISBN 978-3-925443-40-4
- Bilder der Sehnsucht. Photographien 1951–1960, ed. Janos Frecot, Berlin 1994. ISBN 978-3-89479-055-4
- Herbert Tobias Photographien, Stuttgart, 2nd edn. 1987. ISBN 978-3-88059-285-8
- Die Stellung der deutschen Literatur in den achtziger Jahren. Der Photograph Herbert Tobias, Nr 18/19, Verlag Vis-à-Vis 1984, ISBN 978-3-924040-17-8
- Vom New Look zum Petticoat., Berlin 1984
