= Kozłowice =

- Village
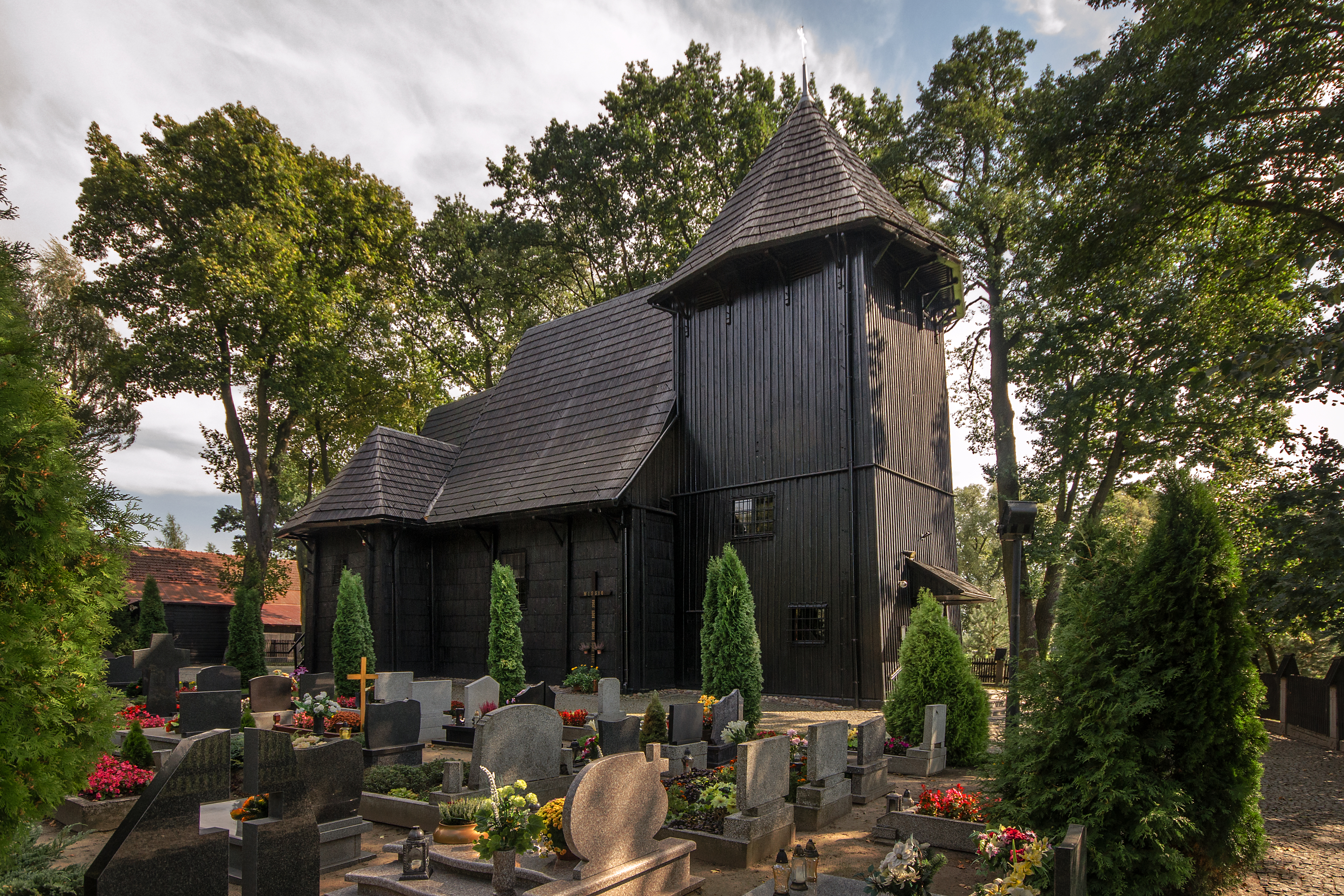
- Catholic church

- Location within Poland
- Coordinates: 50°59′N 18°24′E
- Country: Poland
- Voivodeship: Opole
- County: Olesno
- Gmina: Gorzów Śląski

Kozłowice [kɔzwɔˈvit͡sɛ] is a village in the administrative district of Gmina Gorzów Śląski, within Olesno County, Opole Voivodeship, in south-western Poland.
