= Zdziechowice, Opole Voivodeship =

Zdziechowice
- Village
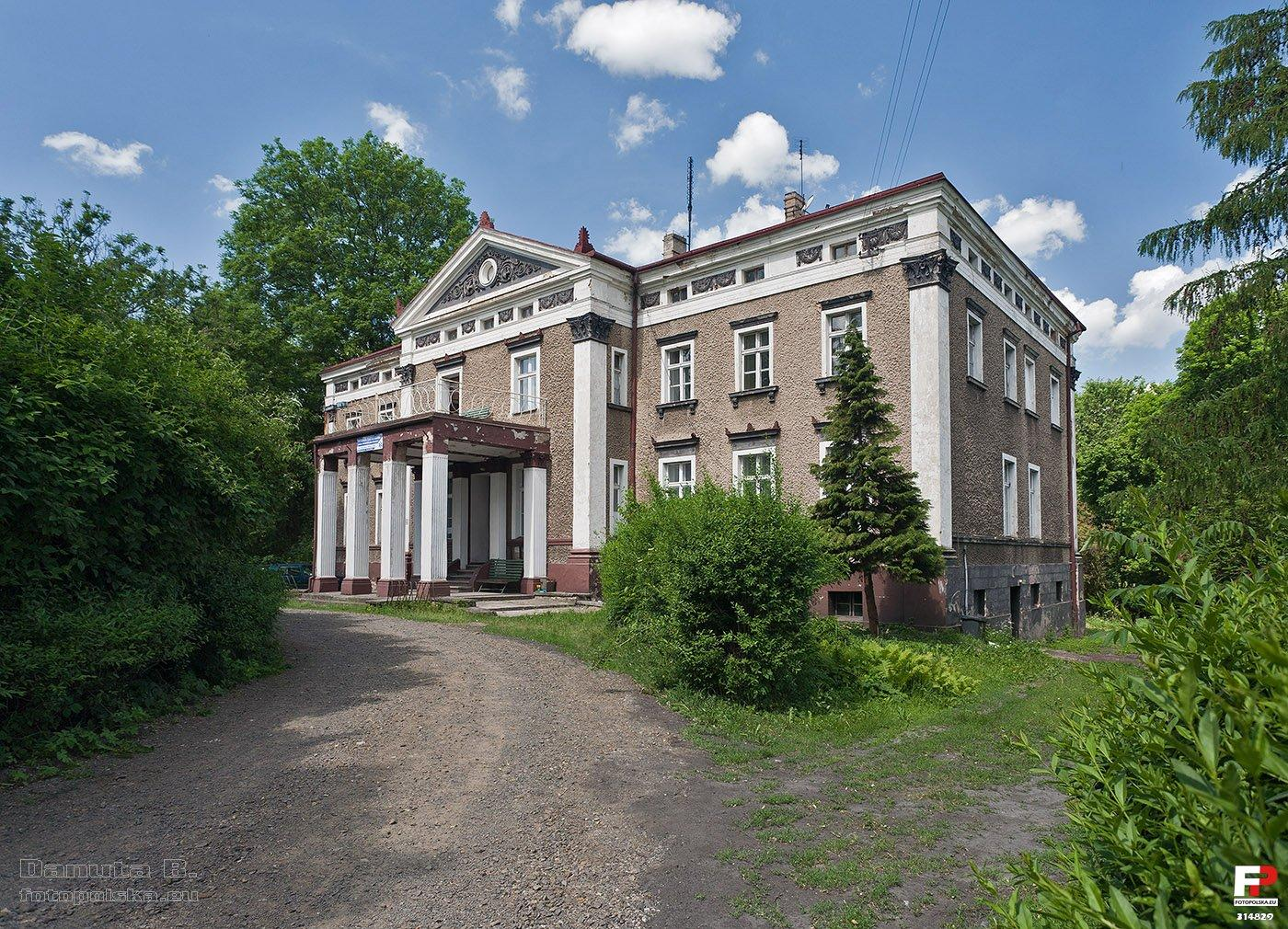
- Palace

- Location within Poland
- Coordinates: 51°6′N 18°24′E
- Country: Poland
- Voivodeship: Opole
- County: Olesno
- Gmina: Gorzów Śląski

Zdziechowice [zd͡ʑɛxɔˈvit͡sɛ] is a village in the administrative district of Gmina Gorzów Śląski, within Olesno County, Opole Voivodeship, in south-western Poland.
