= Jastrzygowice =

- Village
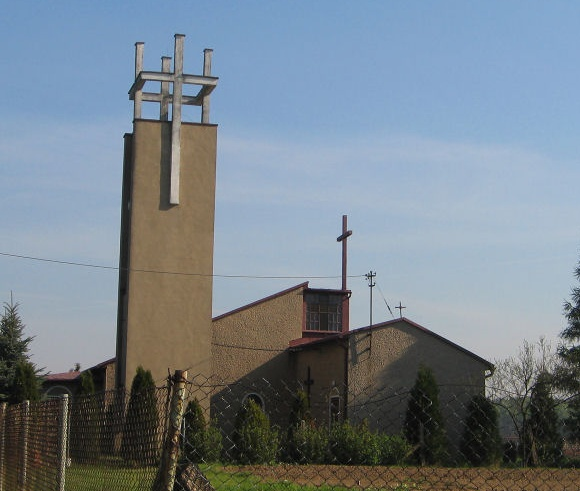
- Catholic church

- Location within Poland
- Coordinates: 50°59′44″N 18°27′22″E
- Country: Poland
- Voivodeship: Opole
- County: Olesno
- Gmina: Gorzów Śląski
- Population: 318

Jastrzygowice [jastʂɨɡɔˈvit͡sɛ] is a village in the administrative district of Gmina Gorzów Śląski, within Olesno County, Opole Voivodeship, in south-western Poland.
