= Gmina Gorzów Śląski =

Gmina Gorzów Śląski Gorzów Śląski Commune
- Gmina
- Coat of arms
- Interactive map of Gmina Gorzów Śląski
- Coordinates (Gorzów Śląski): 51°2′N 18°26′E
- Country: Poland
- Voivodeship: Opole
- County: Olesno
- Seat: Gorzów Śląski

Area
  - Total: 154.12 km^{2} (59.51 sq mi)

Population (2019-06-30)
  - Total: 7,131
  - Density: 46.27/km^{2} (119.8/sq mi)
  - Urban: 2,452
  - Rural: 4,679
- Time zone: UTC+1 (CET)
  - Summer (DST): UTC+2 (CEST)
- Vehicle registration: OOL
- Website: https://gorzowslaski.pl/

Gmina Gorzów Śląski is an urban-rural gmina (administrative district) in Olesno County, Opole Voivodeship, in southern Poland. Its seat is the town of Gorzów Śląski, which lies approximately 18 kilometres (11 mi) north of Olesno and 54 km (34 mi) north-east of the regional capital Opole.

The gmina covers an area of 154.12 square kilometres (59.5 sq mi), and as of 2019 its total population is 7,131.

== Villages ==
Apart from the town of Gorzów Śląski, Gmina Gorzów Śląski contains the villages and settlements of Budzów, Dębina, Gola, Jamy, Jastrzygowice, Kobyla Góra, Kozłowice, Krzyżańcowice, Nowa Wieś Oleska, Pakoszów, Pawłowice Gorzowskie, Skrońsko, Uszyce and Zdziechowice.

== Neighbouring gminas ==
Gmina Gorzów Śląski is bordered by the gminas of Byczyna, Kluczbork, Łubnice, Olesno, Praszka, Radłów and Skomlin.

== Twin towns – sister cities ==
Gmina Gorzów Śląski is twinned with:

- Fehérvárcsurgó, Hungary
- Landsberg, Germany
