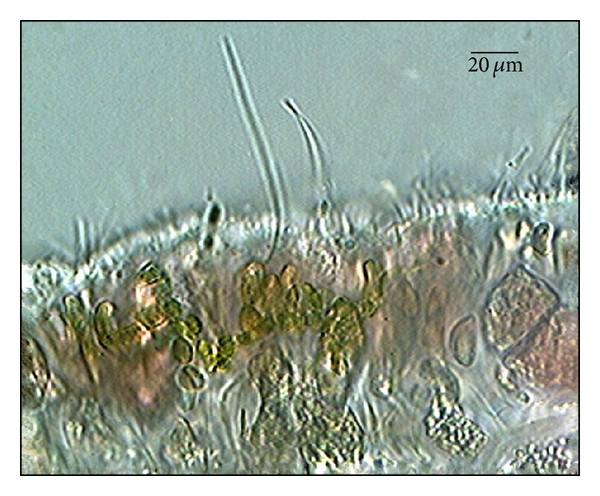
- Acrochaete repens filaments in tissues of kelp Agarum turneri

Scientific classification
- Clade: Viridiplantae
- Division: Chlorophyta
- Class: Ulvophyceae
- Order: Ulvales
- Family: Ulvellaceae
- Genus: Acrochaete; N.Pringsheim

Species
- Acrochaete endozoica; Acrochaete heteroclada; Acrochaete leptochaete; Acrochaete operculata; Acrochaete repens; Acrochaete viridis

= Acrochaete =

Genus of algae

Acrochaete is a genus of marine green algae of the family Ulvellaceae known to live as endoparasites of other algae, although they may eventually be found growing on inorganic substrates, such as rocks.

== Description ==
Species of Acrochaete are small prostrate and filamentous algae with irregularly branched filaments. The cells produce hyaline hairs, which are considered a diagnostic character of the genus.
