= Dębina, Olesno County =

Dębina
- Village
- Location within Poland
- Coordinates: 51°0′36″N 18°21′53″E
- Country: Poland
- Voivodeship: Opole
- County: Olesno
- Gmina: Gorzów Śląski

Dębina [dɛmˈbina] is a village in the administrative district of Gmina Gorzów Śląski, within Olesno County, Opole Voivodeship, in south-western Poland.
