= Pringsheimiella =

Scientific classification
- Clade: Viridiplantae
- Division: Chlorophyta
- Class: Ulvophyceae
- Order: Ulvales
- Family: Ulvellaceae
- Genus: Pringsheimiella; Höhnel, 1920

Type species
- Pringsheimiella scutata

Species
- Pringsheimiella conchyliophila; Pringsheimiella gratulans

Genus of algae

Pringsheimiella is a genus of green algae, in the family Ulvellaceae.

The genus name of Pringsheimiella is in honour of Nathanael Pringsheim (1823–1894), who was a German botanist.

The genus was circumscribed by Franz Xaver Rudolf von Höhnel in Ann. Mykol. vol.18 on page 97 in 1920.

Several species have been moved into other genera;

- P. crenulata (Lami) Nielsen & McLachlan, 1986 now accepted as Ulvella crenulata R.Lami, 1935
- P. marchantiae (Setchell & N.L.Gardner) Schmidt & Petrak, 1935 accepted as Ulvella marchantiae (Setchell & N.L.Gardner) R.Nielsen, C.J.O'Kelly & B Wysor, 2013
- P. mauritiana Børgesen, 1946 accepted as Ulvella mauritiana (Borgesen) R.Nielsen, C.J.O'Kelly & B.Wysor, 2013
- P. sanctae-luciae R.Nielsen & McLachlan, 1986 accepted as Ulvella santae-luciae (R.Nielsen & McLachlan) R.Nielsen, C.J.O'Kelly & B.Wysor, 2013
- P. scutata (Reinke) Marchewianka, 1925 accepted as Ulvella scutata (Reinke) R.Nielsen, C.J.O'Kelly & B.Wysor, 2013
- P. striata A.B.Cribb, 1995 accepted as Ulvella striata (Cribb) R.Nielsen, C.J.O'Kelly & B.Wysor, 2013
- P. udotea (Børgesen) W.R.Taylor, 1960 accepted as Ulvella udoteae (Borgesen) R.Nielsen, C.J.O'Kelly & B.Wysor, 2013
