= Goła =

- Village
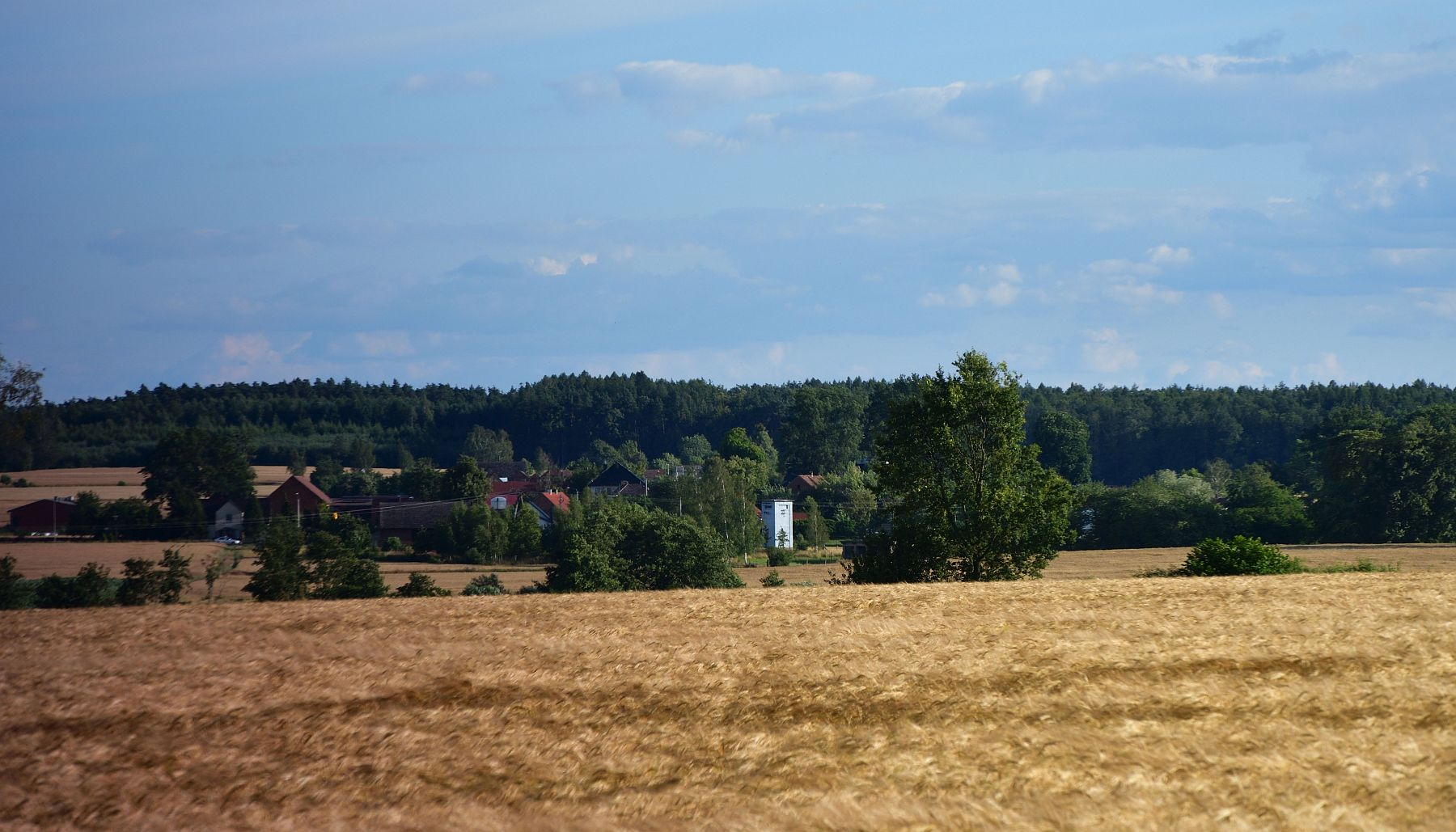

- Location within Poland
- Coordinates: 51°4′8″N 18°22′18″E
- Country: Poland
- Voivodeship: Opole
- Powiat: Olesno
- Gmina: Gorzów Śląski
- Population: 260

Goła [ˈɡɔwa] is a village in the administrative district of Gmina Gorzów Śląski, within Olesno County, Opole Voivodeship, in south-western Poland.
