= Kobyla Góra, Opole Voivodeship =

Kobyla Góra
- Village
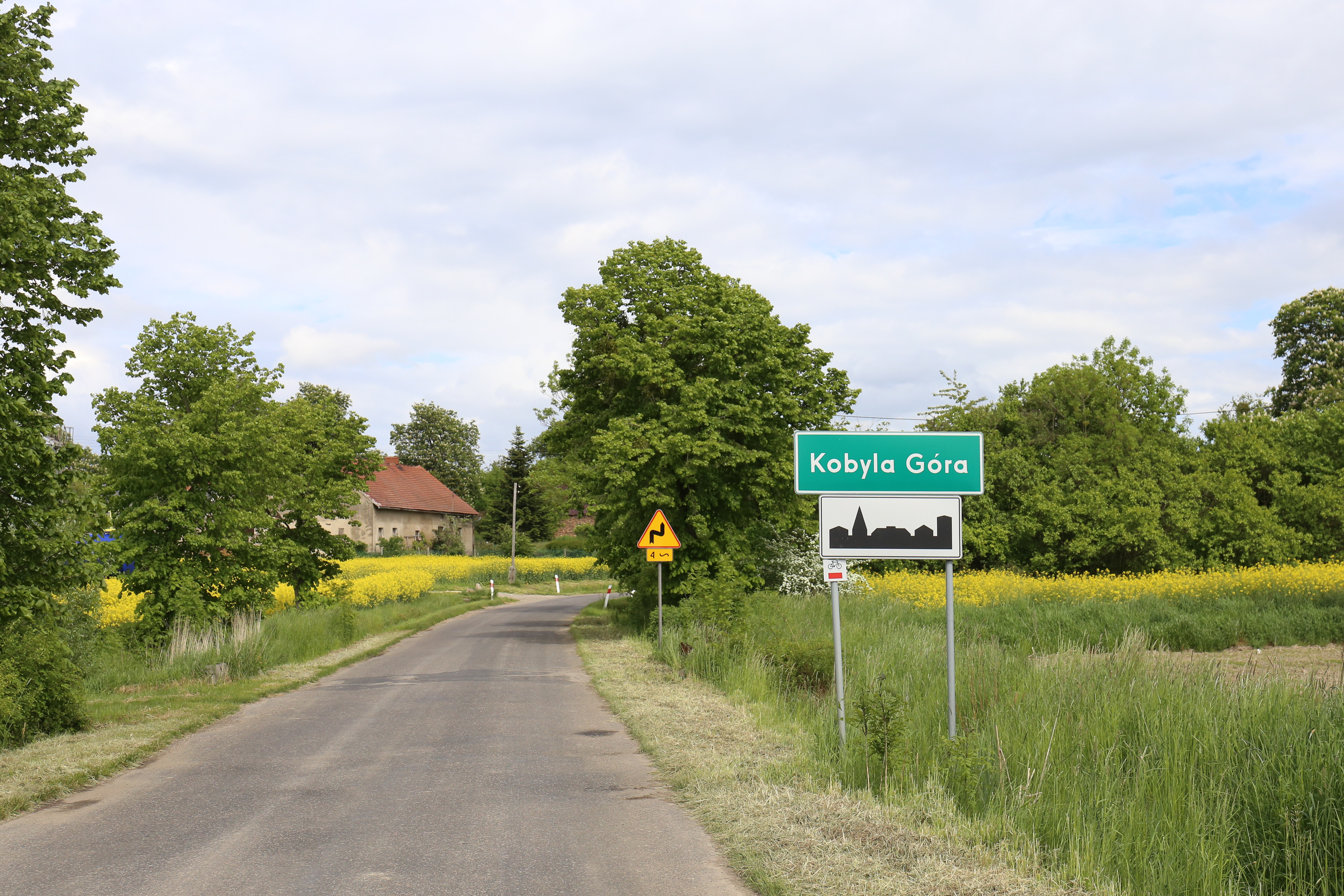

- Location within Poland
- Coordinates: 51°01′21″N 18°18′22″E
- Country: Poland
- Voivodeship: Opole
- County: Olesno
- Gmina: Gorzów Śląski

Kobyla Góra [kɔˈbɨla ˈɡura] is a village in the administrative district of Gmina Gorzów Śląski, within Olesno County, Opole Voivodeship, in south-western Poland.
