= Max Brauer =

German politician (1887–1973)

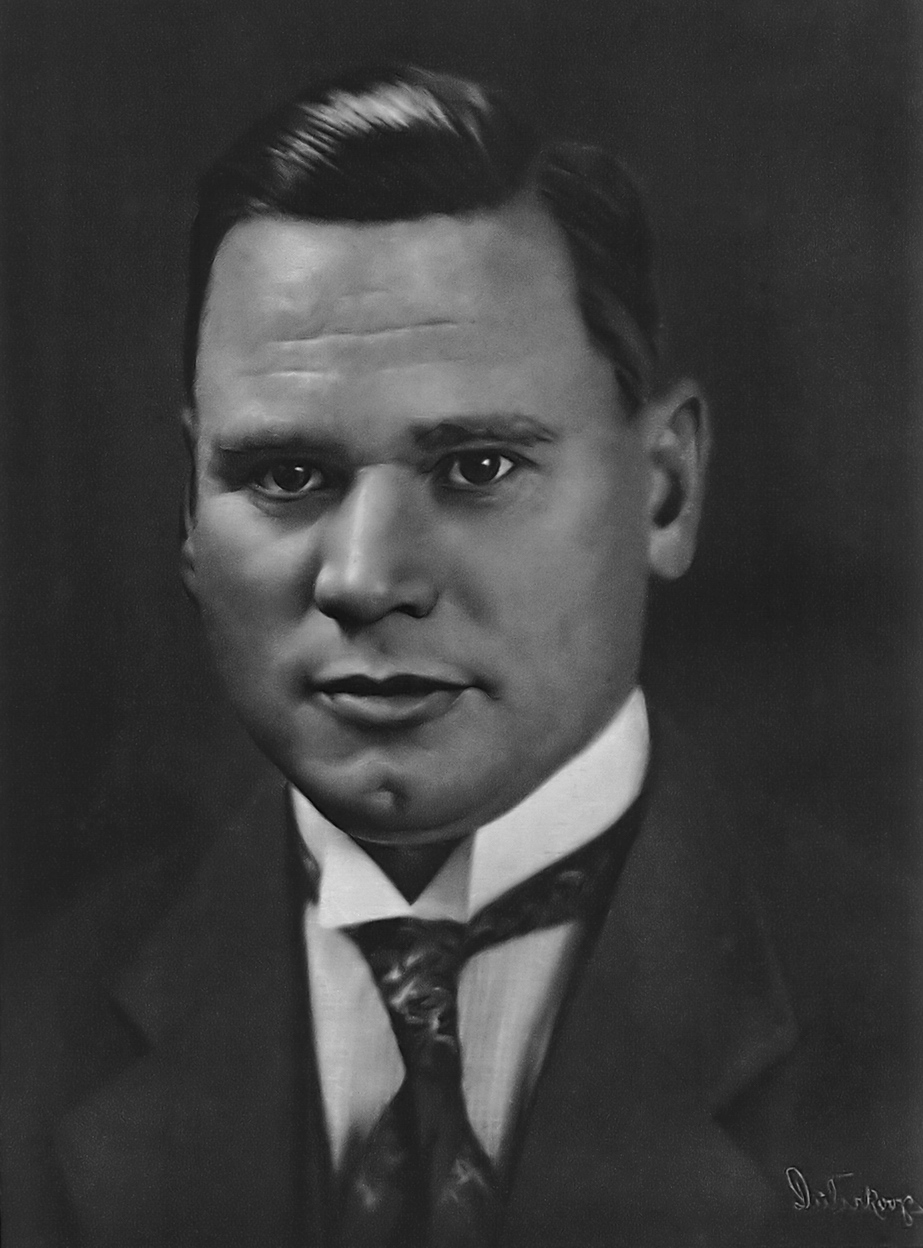
- Brauer in 1927

First Mayor of Hamburg
- In office 4 December 1957 – 31 December 1960
- Second Mayor: Edgar Engelhard
- Preceded by: Kurt Sieveking
- Succeeded by: Paul Nevermann
- In office 22 November 1946 – 2 December 1953
- Second Mayor: Christian Koch; Paul Nevermann
- Preceded by: Rudolf Hieronymus Petersen
- Succeeded by: Kurt Sieveking

Member of the Bundestag; for Hamburg IV
- In office 17 October 1961 – 19 October 1965
- Preceded by: Georg Schneider
- Succeeded by: Hans Apel

Personal details
- Born: Max Julius Friedrich Brauer; 3 September 1887 Ottensen, Germany
- Died: 2 February 1973 (aged 85) Hamburg, West Germany
- Resting place: Altona Main Cemetery
- Party: Social Democratic

Max Julius Friedrich Brauer (3 September 1887 – 2 February 1973) was a German politician of the Social Democratic Party (SPD) and the first elected First Mayor of Hamburg after World War II.

== Life ==
In 1923, Brauer was mayor of the independent city of Altona, Prussia, incorporated into Hamburg after 1937. Brauer fled the Nazi regime to the United States in 1933 with a passport of a friend. In 1934 Brauer's German citizenship was revoked. In July 1946 he came back to Hamburg working for the American Federation of Labor. In October 1946 after the election of the Hamburg Parliament, Brauer was elected as the First Mayor of Hamburg. After Brauer complained in a letter to the British forces about the supply shortfall in Hamburg, the British Governor Vaughan Berry stopped the heating in the officers' mess until there were a solution.

On 16 October 1949, the second Hamburg Parliament election took place where Brauer's party, the SPD, received 65 of the 120 seats. His new Hamburg government ("Senat Brauer II") started February 1950. In October 1953, the next election took place. The SPD received only 58 of the 120 seats; an alliance including the CDU received the other 62 seats. Kurt Sieveking (CDU) became Brauer's successor; the Senate Sieveking started in December 1953. On 10 November 1957, the SPD received 69 of the 120 seats. Brauer and his third Senate started working. Brauer had promised to Paul Nevermann (born 1902) that he would transfer power to him before the end of the term. The 'era Brauer' ended 20 December 1960 with extensive ceremonies.

By the West German federal election in September 1961, Brauer was elected as member of the German Bundestag in Bundestagswahlkreis Hamburg IV (later transformed, see Hamburg-Nord). He was not a candidate for the next federal election in 1965; his successor in his electoral ward Hans Apel (1932–2011) became an important SPD politician and minister (finance, defence).

Brauer is buried in Altona Main Cemetery.

== Honours ==
In 1960, Brauer was given the honorary citizen award of Hamburg. The street Max-Brauer-Allee in the Altona borough is named after him.

== Works ==
- Brauer, Max. 1952. Consecration of the memorial for the Hamburg air raid victims: [speech at the inauguration on 16 August 1952 at Ohlsdorf Cemetery of the memorial for the Hamburg air raid victims.] OCLC 78551498
