= Nowa Wieś Oleska =

- Village
- Location within Poland
- Coordinates: 51°3′13″N 18°24′36″E
- Country: Poland
- Voivodeship: Opole
- County: Olesno
- Gmina: Gorzów Śląski
- Population: 280

Nowa Wieś Oleska [ˈnɔva ˈvjɛɕ ɔˈlɛska] is a village in the administrative district of Gmina Gorzów Śląski, within Olesno County, Opole Voivodeship, in south-western Poland.
