= Budzów, Opole Voivodeship =

Budzów
- Village
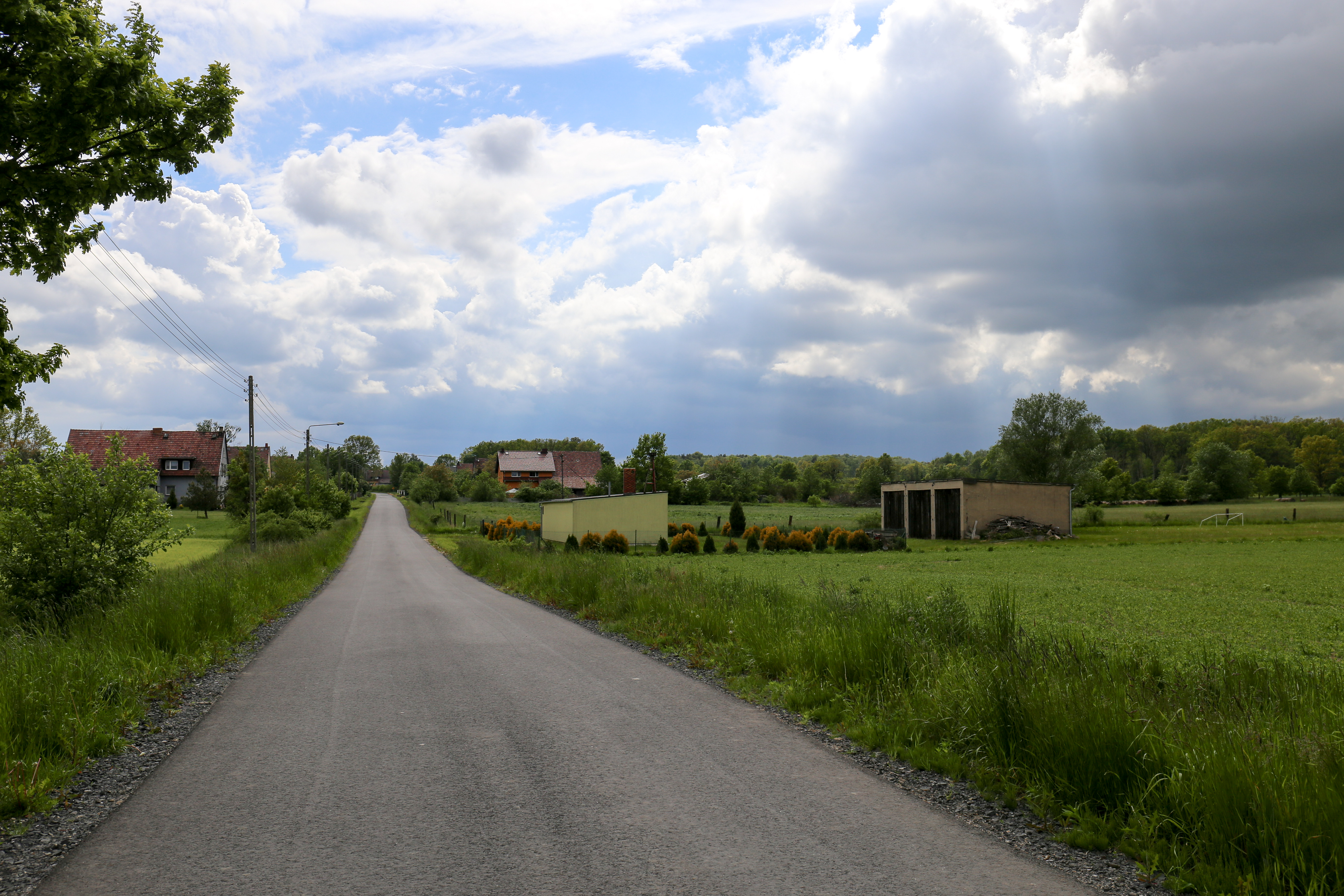

- Location within Poland
- Coordinates: 51°2′N 18°21′E
- Country: Poland
- Voivodeship: Opole
- County: Olesno
- Gmina: Gorzów Śląski

Budzów [ˈbud͡zuf] is a village in the administrative district of Gmina Gorzów Śląski, within Olesno County, Opole Voivodeship, in south-western Poland.
