= Gorzów Śląski =

Town in Silesia

Gorzów Śląski Gorzōw Ślōnski
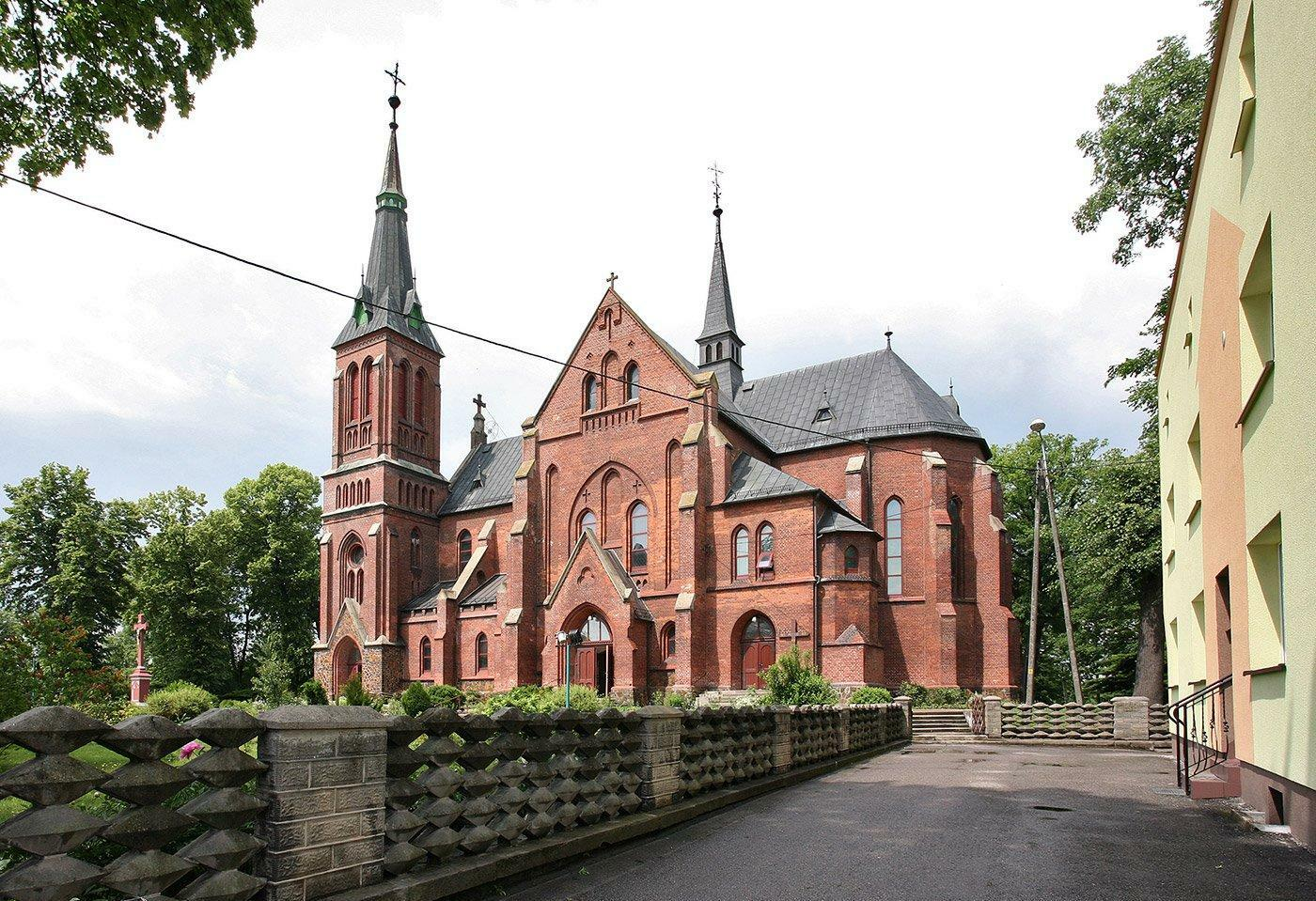
- Church of the Holy Trinity

- Flag Coat of arms

- Location within Poland
- Coordinates: 51°2′N 18°26′E
- Country: Poland
- Voivodeship: Opole
- County: Olesno
- Gmina: Gorzów Śląski
- Town rights: 1274

Area
  - Total: 18.68 km^{2} (7.21 sq mi)

Population (2019-06-30)
  - Total: 2,452
  - Density: 131.3/km^{2} (340.0/sq mi)
- Time zone: UTC+1 (CET)
  - Summer (DST): UTC+2 (CEST)
- Postal code: 46-310
- Vehicle registration: OOL
- Website: http://www.gorzowslaski.pl

Gorzów Śląski (Polish pronunciation: [ˈɡɔʐuf ˈɕlɔ̃skʲi]; German: Landsberg in Oberschlesien; Silesian: Gorzōw Ślōnski) is a town in Olesno County, Opole Voivodeship, in southern Poland, with 2,452 inhabitants (2019).

It was granted town rights in 1274.

== Notable people ==
- Nathanael Pringsheim (1823–1894), Jewish German botanist
- Herbert Weichmann (1896–1983), Jewish German politician

== Twin towns – sister cities ==
See twin towns of Gmina Gorzów Śląski.
