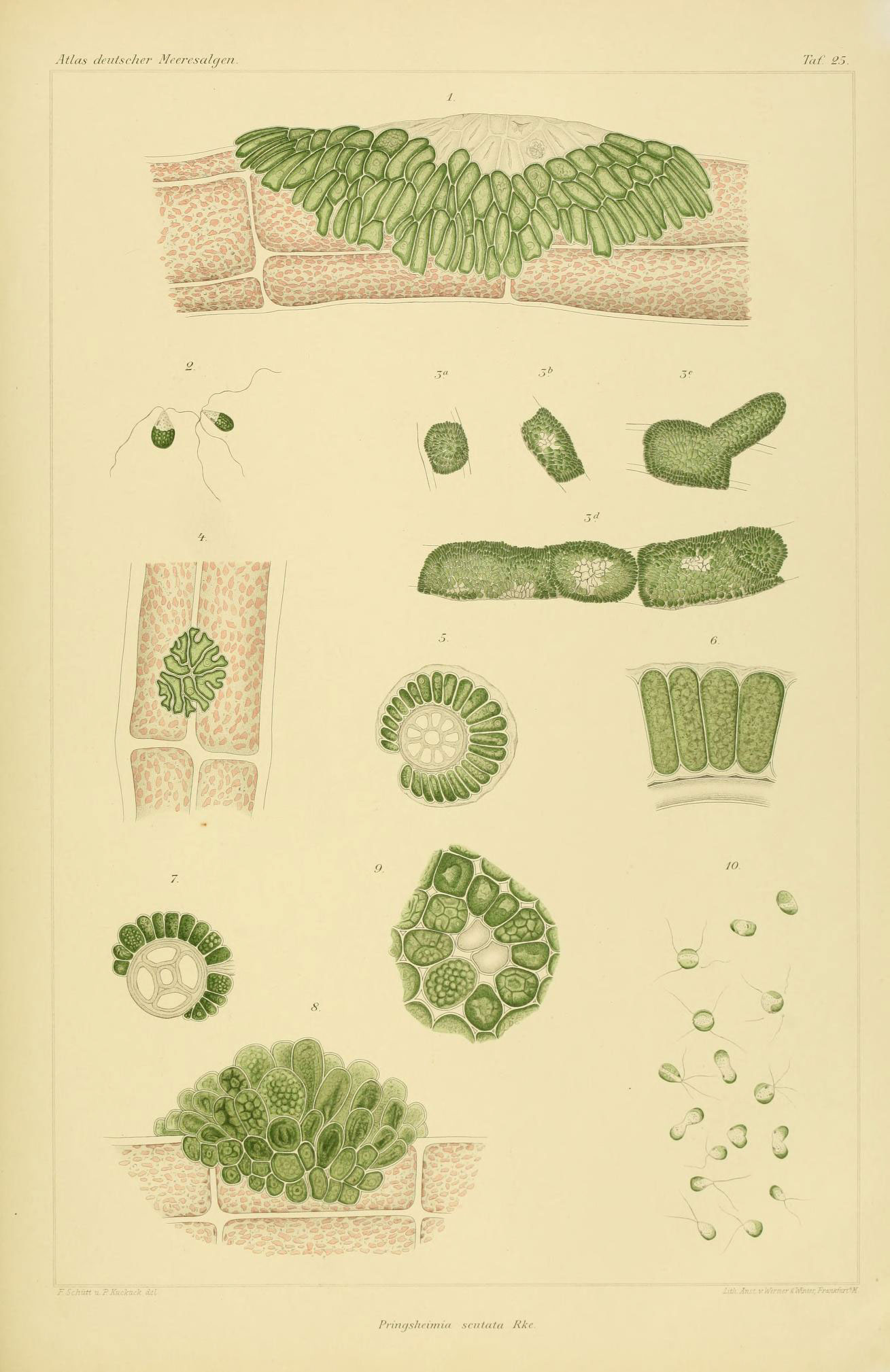
- Ulvella scutata

Scientific classification
- Kingdom: Plantae
- Division: Chlorophyta
- Class: Ulvophyceae
- Order: Ulvales
- Family: Ulvellaceae
- Genus: Ulvella; P.L.Crouan & H.M.Crouan, 1859

Type species
- Ulvella lens P.L.Crouan & H.M.Crouan

= Ulvella (alga) =

Genus of algae

Ulvella is a genus of endophytic microalgae in the family Ulvellaceae. Species of Ulvella are found growing within or on other algae, plants, or shells. Most species are found in marine habitats, but a few grow in fresh waters.

Ulvella consists of thalli in various forms, ranging from uniseriate (one cell thick) filaments, pseudoparenchymatous discs of filaments, hollow masses of cells, or some combination thereof. Vegetative cells contain a single parietal lobed chloroplast with one or several pyrenoids. Some cells produce long hair-like extensions of the cells (setae).

Ulvella reproduces asexually and sexually. Asexual reproduction occurs via zoospores with two, three or four flagella, which are produced in bottle-shaped or elongated sporangia. Sexual reproduction is anisogamous, with biflagellate gametes. The life history of Ulvella involves an alternation of generations, with haploid and diploid generations being isomorphic.
