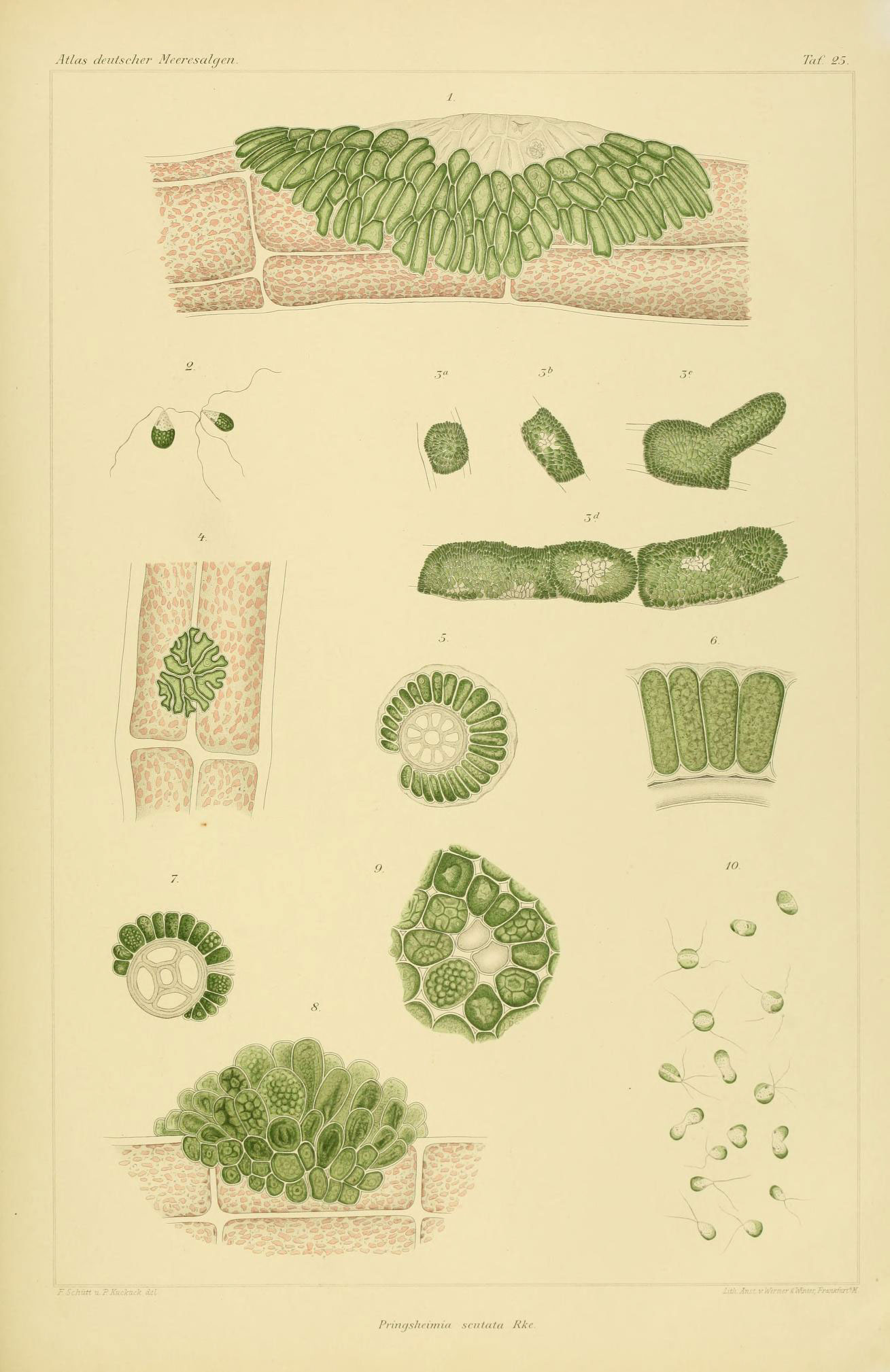
- Ulvella scutata

Scientific classification
- Kingdom: Plantae
- Division: Chlorophyta
- Class: Ulvophyceae
- Order: Ulvales
- Family: Ulvellaceae; Schmidle

Genera
- Acrochaete; Endoderma; Entocladia; Entoderma; Epicladia; Pringsheimiella; Pseudopringsheimia; Syncoryne; Trichothyra; Ulvella

= Ulvellaceae =

Family of algae

Ulvellaceae is a family of green algae in the order Ulvales.

Ulvellaceae consists of macroscopic and macroscopic algae that are usually attached to a substrate, occasionally free-living. They form branched filaments or pseudoparenchymatous masses. Cells contain a single nucleus and a single parietal chloroplast with one to several pyrenoids. Both asexual and sexual reproduction have been observed in representatives of Ulvellaceae.
