= Ulvella (fungus) =

Scientific classification
- Kingdom: Fungi
- Division: Ascomycota
- Class: incertae sedis
- Order: incertae sedis
- Family: incertae sedis
- Genus: Ulvella (Nyl.) Trevis.
- Species: U. chlorospila

Binomial name
- Ulvella chlorospila (Nyl.) Trevis.

Genus of fungus

Ulvella is a genus of fungi in the Ascomycota phylum. The relationship of this taxon to other taxa within the phylum is unknown (incertae sedis), and it has not yet been placed with certainty into any class, order, or family. This is a monotypic genus, containing the single species Ulvella chlorospila.

== See also ==
- List of Ascomycota genera incertae sedis
