= Baqi =

Baqi may refer to:

== People ==
- Baqi ibn Makhlad (820-889) Spanish scholar of Islam and warrior
- Ibn Baqi (died 1145 or 1150), Arab poet
- Mirza Baqi, 17th-century Mughal general
- Muhammad Fuad Abdul Baqi (1882–1968), Egyptian scholar of Islam, poet, editor and translator
- Sajjadullah Baqi (born 1979), Pakistani politician and businessman
- Baqi Siddiqui, pen name of Pakistani poet Muhammad Afzal (1905–1972)
- Baqi Tashqandi, also known as Mir Baqi, 16th century Mughal commander (beg) under Babur, the first Mughal emperor
- Baqi Urmançe (1897–1990), Russian Tatar painter, sculptor, graphic artist and pedagogue
- Abdul Baqi (cricketer), 21st century Afghan cricketer
- Abdul Baqi (Pakistani politician) (1939–2001), Pakistani politician
- Abdul Baqi (Taliban governor) (born 1962), former Taliban governor, diplomat and cabinet member
- Ashraf Abdel Baqi (born 1963), Egyptian actor

== Places ==
- Baqi, Iran (disambiguation), several villages

== See also ==
- Abdul Baqi (disambiguation), an Arabic theophoric name
- al-Bāqī, one of the names of God in Islam
- Baki (disambiguation)
