= Baki =

Baki (Arabic: باقي) may refer to:

== Places ==
- Baku, the capital of Azerbaijan (Azerbaijani: Bakı)
- Bąki (disambiguation), various villages in Poland
- Baki District, Awdal region, Somalia
- Baki town, Somaliland

== People ==
- Baki, an 18th dynasty ancient Egyptian prince buried in the Valley of the Queen QV72
- Bâkî, the pen name of Mahmud Abdülbâkî (1526–1600), Turkish poet of the Ottoman era
- Baki (given name)
- Baki (surname)

== In fiction ==
- Baki the Grappler, manga and anime about Baki, an unbelievably strong fighter
- Baki (Naruto), a character in the manga and anime Naruto
- A fictional country consisting of a small Pacific island north of Australia in Madeleine L'Engle's writing

== Other uses ==
- Baki language, spoken on the island of Epi in Vanuatu

== See also ==
- Baqi (disambiguation)
- Abdul Baqi (disambiguation), an Arabic theophoric name
- Bakkie (disambiguation)
