= Abd al-Baqi =

ʻAbd al-Bāqī (ALA-LC romanization of Arabic: عبد الباقي) is a male Muslim given name. It is built from the Arabic words ʻabd and al-Bāqī, one of the names of God in the Qur'an, which give rise to the Muslim theophoric names. It means "servant of the Everlasting".

It may refer to:

- Abd ol-Baghi Tabrizi (-1629), Iranian Calligrapher
- Abd-al-Baqi al-Zurqani (1611–1688) Egyptian Islamic scholar
- Abdelbaki Hermassi (born 1937), Tunisian politician
- Abdelbaki Sahraoui (1910–1995), Algerian politician
- Abdul Bagi Baryal, Afghan politician
- Abdul Baqi Jammoh (1924–2016), Jordanian politician
- Abdul Baqi Turkistani, Afghan politician
- Abdul Baqi (cricketer), Afghan cricketer
- Abdul Baqi (Pakistani politician) (1939–2001), Pakistani politician
- Abdolbaghi Darvish (1948–1986), Iranian War Martyr
- Abdul Baqi (Taliban governor) (born 1962), former Taliban governor, diplomat, and cabinet member
- Abdulbagi Ali oglu Zulalov, known as Bulbuljan (1841–1927), Azerbaijani singer
- Hussein Abdelbagi (born 1960s), South Sudanese politician
- Mahmud Abdülbâkî, pen name Bâkî (1526–1600), Turkish poet
- Muhammad Fu'ad Abd al-Baqi (1882–1967), Egyptian Qur'an and hadith scholar
- Nashwan Abdulrazaq Abdulbaqi, known as Abdul Hadi al Iraqi (born 1961), Iraqi Kurd held in Guantanamo
- Sabit Damulla Abdulbaki (1883–1934), Prime Minister of the Turkish Islamic Republic of East Turkestan
