= Sunan ibn Majah =

9th-century collection of Islamic hadith

Sunan Ibn Mājah
- An old manuscript excerpt
- Author: Ibn Mājah
- Original title: سُنَن ٱبْن مَاجَه
- Language: Arabic
- Series: Kutub al-Sittah
- Genre: Hadith collection

Sunan Ibn Mājah (Arabic: سُنَن ٱبْن مَاجَه) is one of the six major Sunni hadith collections (Kutub al-Sittah). The Sunan was authored by Ibn Mājah (born 824 CE, died 887CE). It is the sixth and last of the six canonical works of hadith.

== Description ==
It contains 4,341 ahadith in 32 books (kutub) divided into 1,500 chapters (abwāb). Some 1,329 hadith are only found in it, and not in the other five canonical works. About 20 of the traditions it contains were later declared to be forged; such as those dealing with the merits of individuals, tribes or towns, including Ibn Mājah's home town of Qazvin.

== Views ==
Sunni Muslims regard this collection as sixth in terms of authenticity of their six major hadith collections. Although Ibn Mājah related hadith from scholars across the eastern Islamic world, neither he nor his Sunan were well known outside of his native region of northwestern Iran until the 5th/11th century. Muḥammad ibn Ṭāhir al-Maqdisī (died 507/1113) remarked that while Ibn Mājah's Sunan was well regarded in Ray, Iran, it was not widely known among the broader community of Muslim jurists outside of Iran. It was also Muḥammad b. Ṭāhir who first proposed a six-book canon of the most authentic Sunni hadith collections in his Shurūṭ al-aʾimma al-sitta, which included Ibn Mājah's Sunan alongside Sahih Bukhari, Sahih Muslim, Sunan Abu Dawud, Sunan Nasai, and Jami al-Tirmidhi. Nonetheless, consensus among Sunni scholars concerning this six-book canon, which included Ibn Mājah's Sunan, did not occur until the 7th/13th century, and even then this consensus was largely contained to the Sunni scholarly community in the eastern Islamic world. Scholars such as al-Nawawi (died 676/1277) and Ibn Khaldun (died 808/1405) excluded Sunan Ibn Mājah from their lists of canonical Sunni hadith collections, while others replaced it with either the Muwatta Imam Malik or with the Sunan al-Darimi. It was not until Ibn al-Qaisarani's formal standardization of the Sunni hadith cannon into six books in the 11th century that Ibn Majah's collection was regarded the esteem granted to the five other books.

== Contents ==
Editor, Muhammad Fu'ād 'Abd al-Bāqī's 1952–53 Cairo publication, in 2 volumes, provides the standard topical classification of the hadith Arabic text. The book is divided into 37 volumes.

1. the book of purification and its sunnah
2. the book of the prayer
3. the book of the adhan (the call to prayer) and the sunnah regarding it
4. the book on the mosques and the congregations
5. establishing the prayer and the sunnah regarding them
6. chapters regarding funerals
7. fasting
8. the chapters regarding zakat
9. the chapters on marriage
10. the chapters on divorce
11. the chapters on expiation
12. the chapters on business transactions
13. the chapters on rulings
14. the chapters on gifts
15. the chapters on charity
16. the chapters on pawning
17. the chapters on shufa (preemption)
18. the chapters on lost property
19. the chapters on manumission (of slaves)
20. the chapters on legal punishments
21. the chapters on blood money
22. the chapters on wills
23. chapters on shares of inheritance
24. the chapters on jihad
25. chapters on hajj rituals
26. chapters on sacrifices
27. chapters on slaughtering
28. chapters on hunting
29. chapters on food
30. chapters on drinks
31. chapters on medicine
32. chapters on dress
33. etiquette
34. supplication
35. interpretation of dreams
36. tribulations
37. zuhd

== Commentaries ==
=== Arabic ===
1. Sharh Sunan Ibn Majah by Abu al-Hasan Ali ibn Abd Allah ibn Niamah al-Ansari al-Andalusi (d. 567 AH).
2. Sharh Sunan Ibn Majah by Abd al-Latif al-Baghdadi (d. 629 AH).
3. Al-Ilam bi Sunnatih alayh as-Salatu wa ’s-Salam Sharh Sunan Ibn Majah by Maghlatay ibn Qalij (d. 762 AH). Published by Dar Ibn Abbas in five volumes with tahqiq by Ahmad ibn Ibrahim ibn Abi ’l-Aynayn.
4. Ma Tamassu ilayhi al-Hajah min Sharh Ibn Majah by Ibn al-Mulaqqin (d. 804 AH). Published by Dar al-Muqtabis.
5. Ihda ad-Dibajah bi-Sharh Sunan Ibn Majah by Al-Damiri (d. 808 AH).
6. Al-Hawashi ala Sunan Ibn Majah by Sibt Ibn al-Ajami
7. Misbah az-Zujajah ala Sunan Ibn Majah by Al-Suyuti (d. 911 AH). Published by Dar Ibn Hazm with tahqiq by Muhammad Shaib Sharif.
8. Kifayat al-Hajah fi Sharh Ibn Majah by al-Sindi Abu al-Hasan Muhammad ibn Abd al-Hadi (d. 1138 AH). This work is a marginal commentary (hashiyah).
9. Ma Tad’u ilayhi al-Hajah ala Sunan Ibn Majah by Shams ad-Din Abu ar-Rida Muhammad ibn Hasan az-Zubaidi ash-Shafii.
10. Miftah al-Hajah bi Sharh Sunan Ibn Majah by Muhammad ibn Abd Allah al-Alawi al-Funjani (d. 1382 AH). Published by Dar al-Kutub al-Ilmiyyah in four volumes with tahqiq by Abu Abd ar-Rahman Adil ibn Saad.
11. Murshid Dhawi ’l-Hija wa ’l-Hajah ila Sunan Ibn Majah by Muhammad al-Amin ibn Abdillah al-Ithyubi al-Harari. Published by Dar al-Manhaj in twenty-six volumes, and it is regarded as the most comprehensive modern commentary on Sunan Ibn Majah.
12. Al-Imam Ibn Majah wa Kitabuhu as-Sunan by Abdul Rasheed Nomani (d. 1420 AH). Published by Dar as-Salam with tahqiq by Abd al-Fattah Abu Ghudda.

=== Urdu ===
1. Sunan Ibn Majah Sharif by Qasim Amin. Published by Maktabat al-Ilm. Although this work is mainly a translation, it still includes concise commentary.
2. Sunan Ibn Majah by 'Ata Allah Sajid. Published by I'tiqad Publishing House in five volumes with tahqiq (research) by Hafiz Abu Tahir Zubair 'Alizai.
3. Sharh Sunan Ibn Majah by Muhammad Liyaqat 'Ali Ridwi. The translation is by Muhy ad-Din Jahangir. Published by Shabbir Brothers in six volumes.
4. Misbah az-Zujajah Sharh Mushkilat Ibn Majah by As'ad Qasim Sumbhuli. Published by Maktabah Nu'maniyyah.

== See also ==
- List of Sunni books
- Sahih al-Bukhari
- Sahih Muslim
- Sunan Abu Dawood
- Sahih al-Tirmidhi
- Al-Sunan al-Sughra
- Muwatta Imam Malik
