= Baki (given name) =

Baki is a Turkish masculine given name that may refer to the following notable people:

- Baki Davrak (born 1971), Turkish-German actor
- Baki İlkin (born 1943), Turkish diplomat
- Baki Jashari (born 1960), Kosovar composer, conductor, and music educator
- Baki Mercimek (born 1982), Turkish football player
- Baki Sarısakal (born 1954), Turkish researcher, historian and author
- Baki Süha Ediboğlu (1915–1972), Turkish poet and author
