= Warlow (disambiguation) =

Warlow is a municipality in Germany.

Warlow may also refer to:

== People ==
- Anthony Warlow (born 1961), opera and musical theatre performer
- Craig Warlow (born 1975), rugby union player
- Jacob B. Warlow (1818–1890), law enforcement officer
- John Warlow (born 1939), dual-code rugby player
- Owain Warlow (born 1987), footballer
- Richard Warlow, screenwriter, co-writer of the 2021 TV series The Serpent

== Other uses ==
- Warlow (True Blood), a fictional character in American television drama series True Blood
- Warłów, village in Poland

== See also ==
- Warlow Athletic Club
