= Kolejka =

Kolejka may refer to:

- Kolejka (game)
- Kolejka, Opole Voivodeship
