= Główczyce =

Główczyce may refer to:

- Główczyce, Opole Voivodeship, Poland
- Główczyce, Pomeranian Voivodeship, Poland
