= Shufa (Islam) =

Concept in Islamic law

Shufa (Arabic: حق_الشفعة haqa al-shufea, often translated as "preemption") is an Islamic concept similar to the right of first refusal in Western law.

The ninth-century Sunan ibn Majah collects hadith related to shufa. For example:

It was narrated that Jabir said:

The Messenger of Allah (ﷺ) said:

Whoever has a date-palm tree or land, should not sell it until he has offered it to his partner.
