= Turza, Opole Voivodeship =

Turza
- Village
- Location within Poland
- Coordinates: 50°43′7″N 18°21′51″E
- Country: Poland
- Voivodeship: Opole
- County: Olesno
- Gmina: Dobrodzień
- Population: 22

Turza [ˈtuʐa] is a village in the administrative district of Gmina Dobrodzień, within Olesno County, Opole Voivodeship, in south-western Poland.
