= Szemrowice =

- Village
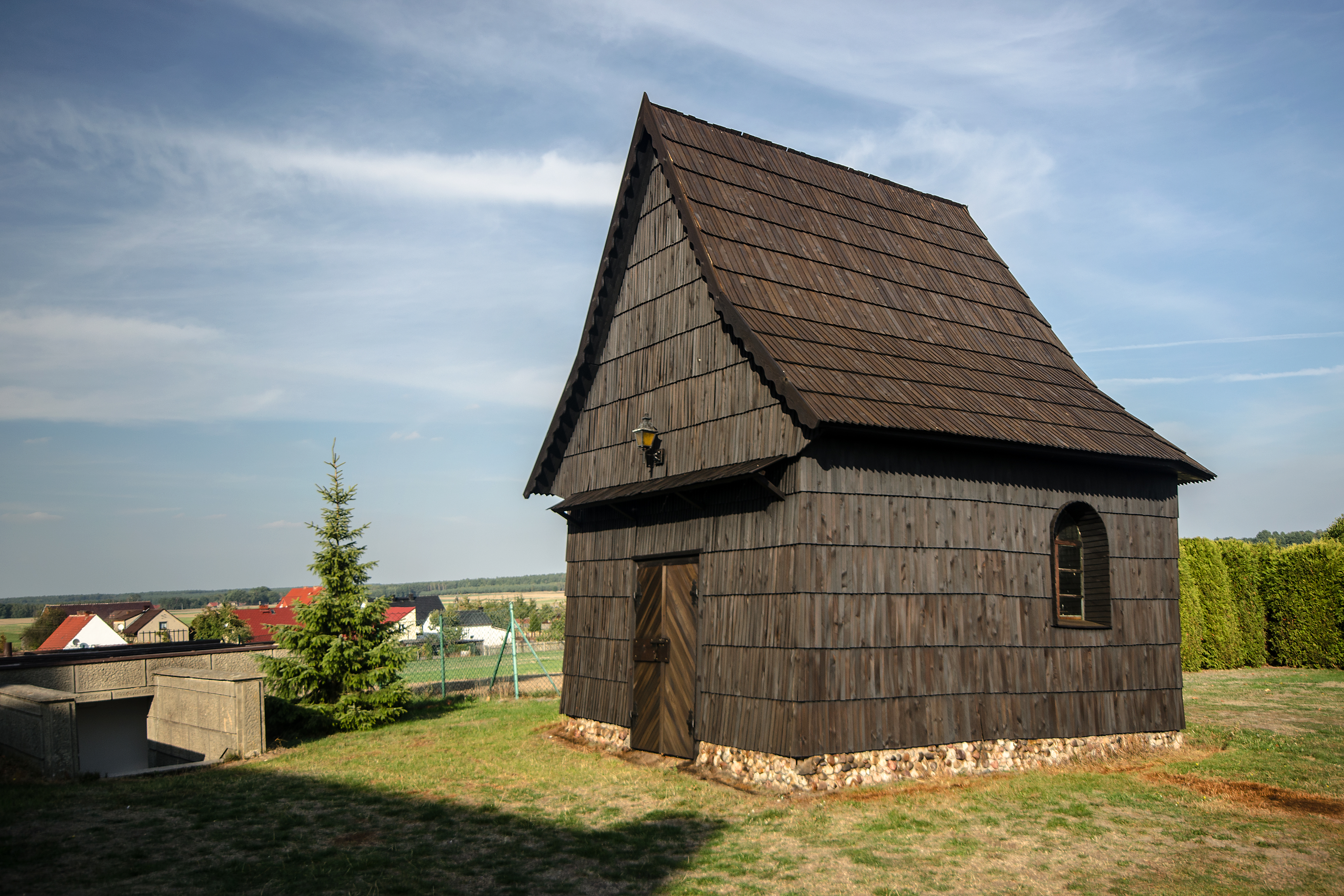
- Chapel

- Location within Poland
- Coordinates: 50°45′N 18°24′E
- Country: Poland
- Voivodeship: Opole
- County: Olesno
- Gmina: Dobrodzień

Szemrowice [ʂɛmrɔˈvit͡sɛ] is a village in the administrative district of Gmina Dobrodzień, within Olesno County, Opole Voivodeship, in south-western Poland.
