= Bakkie =

Bakkie may refer to:

- Pickup truck, a South African and Dutch informal term for a pickup truck
- Bakkie, Suriname, a resort and town in Suriname

== See also ==
- Bakkies Botha
- Baki (disambiguation)
