= Bąki =

Bąki may refer to the following villages in Poland:

- Bąki, Lower Silesian Voivodeship (south-west Poland)
- Bąki, Łódź Voivodeship (central Poland)
- Bąki, Masovian Voivodeship (east-central Poland)
- Bąki, Opole Voivodeship (south-west Poland)
