= Błachów =

- Village
- Location within Poland
- Coordinates: 50°43′22″N 18°24′51″E
- Country: Poland
- Voivodeship: Opole
- County: Olesno
- Gmina: Dobrodzień

Błachów [ˈbwaxuf] is a village in the administrative district of Gmina Dobrodzień, within Olesno County, Opole Voivodeship, in south-western Poland.
