= Baqi, Iran =

Baqi (Persian: باقی, بقی, or بقیع) may refer to:

- Baqi, Golestan, Golestan Province
- Baqi, Nishapur, Razavi Khorasan Province
- Baqi, South Khorasan, South Khorasan Province
- Baqi, Zaveh, Razavi Khorasan Province
