= Ligota Dobrodzieńska =

Ligota Dobrodzieńska Ellguth Guttentag
- Village
- Location within Poland
- Coordinates: 50°44′N 18°24′E
- Country: Poland
- Voivodeship: Opole
- County: Olesno
- Gmina: Dobrodzień
- Time zone: UTC+1 (CET)
  - Summer (DST): UTC+2 (CEST)
- Vehicle registration: OOL

Ligota Dobrodzieńska [liˈɡɔta dɔbrɔˈd͡ʑɛɲska] is a village in the administrative district of Gmina Dobrodzień, within Olesno County, Opole Voivodeship, in southern Poland.

The village is officially bilingual in both Polish and German.
