= Makowczyce =

- Village
- Location within Poland
- Coordinates: 50°44′04″N 18°23′04″E
- Country: Poland
- Voivodeship: Opole
- County: Olesno
- Gmina: Dobrodzień

Makowczyce [makɔfˈt͡ʂɨt͡sɛ] is a village in the administrative district of Gmina Dobrodzień, within Olesno County, Opole Voivodeship, in south-western Poland.
