= Bzinica Nowa =

- Village
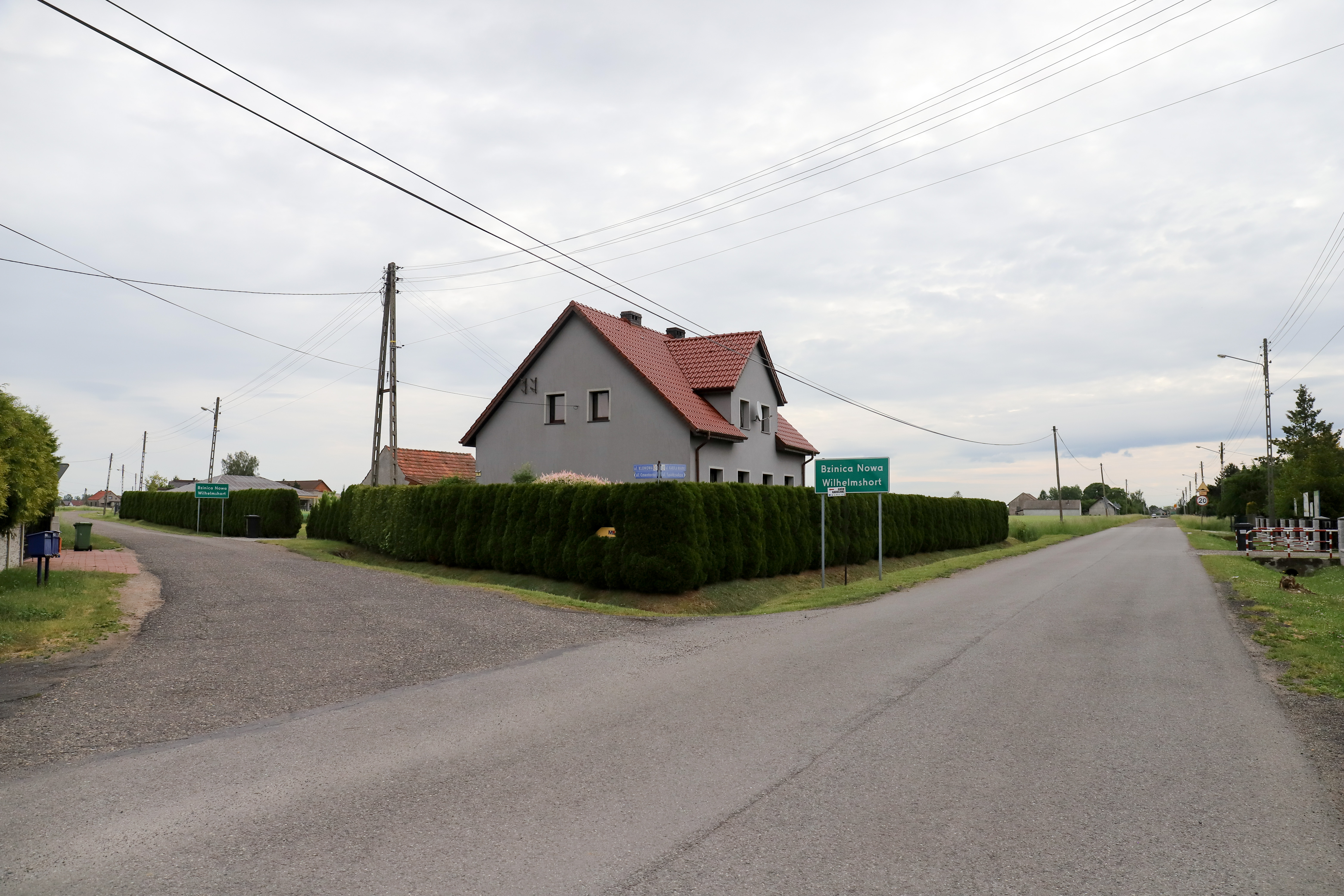

- Location within Poland
- Coordinates: 50°41′32″N 18°28′34″E
- Country: Poland
- Voivodeship: Opole
- County: Olesno
- Gmina: Dobrodzień

Bzinica Nowa [bʑiˈnit͡sa ˈnɔva] is a village in the administrative district of Gmina Dobrodzień, within Olesno County, Opole Voivodeship, in south-western Poland.
