= Pludry =

- Village
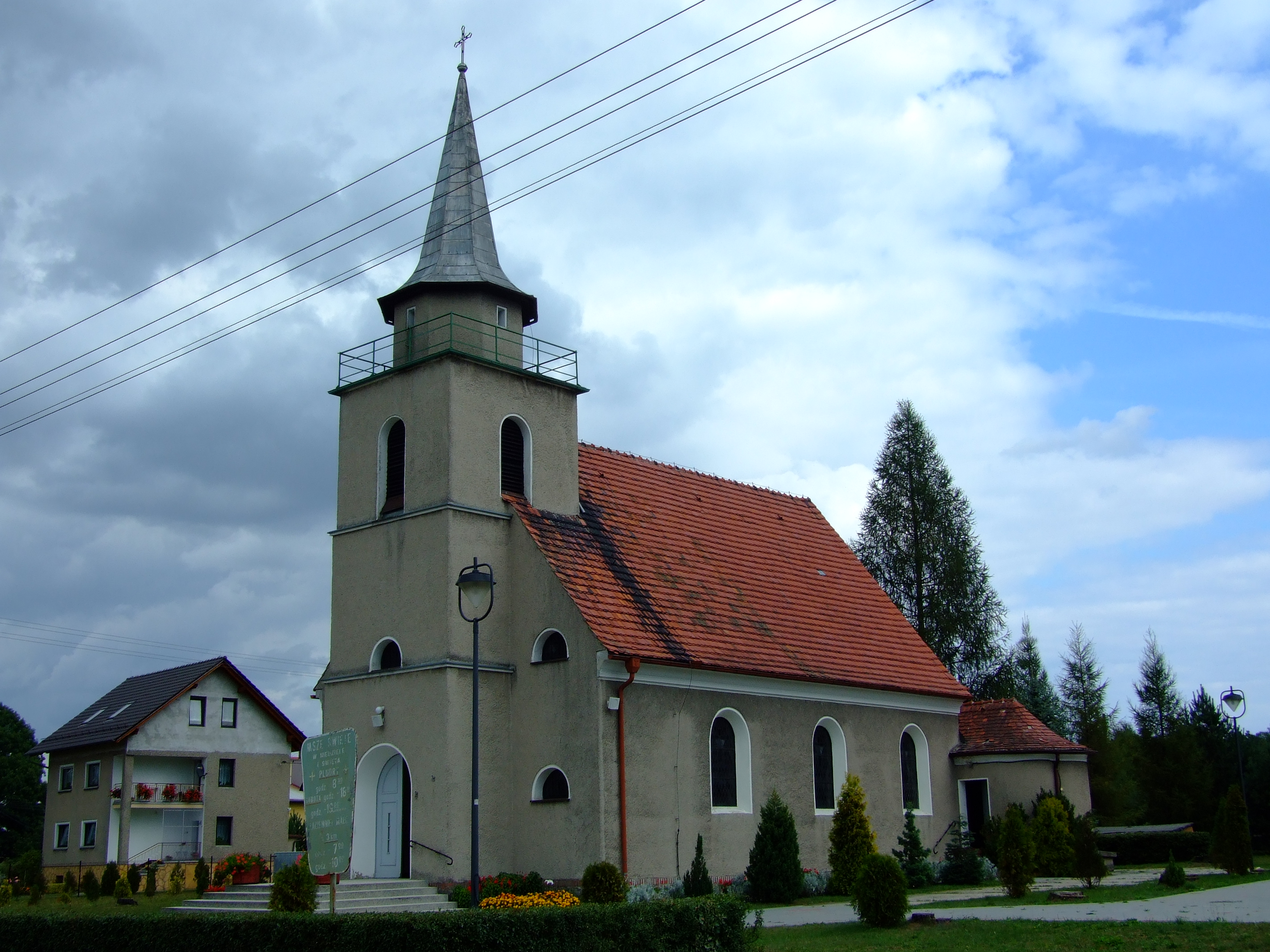
- Catholic church

- Location within Poland
- Coordinates: 50°40′N 18°28′E
- Country: Poland
- Voivodeship: Opole
- County: Olesno
- Gmina: Dobrodzień
- Time zone: UTC+1 (CET)
  - Summer (DST): UTC+2 (CEST)
- Vehicle registration: OOL

Pludry [ˈpludrɨ] is a village in the administrative district of Gmina Dobrodzień, within Olesno County, Opole Voivodeship, in southern Poland.

Like other communities in Gmina Dobrodzień, it is officially bilingual in both Polish and German.
