= Malichów =

- Village
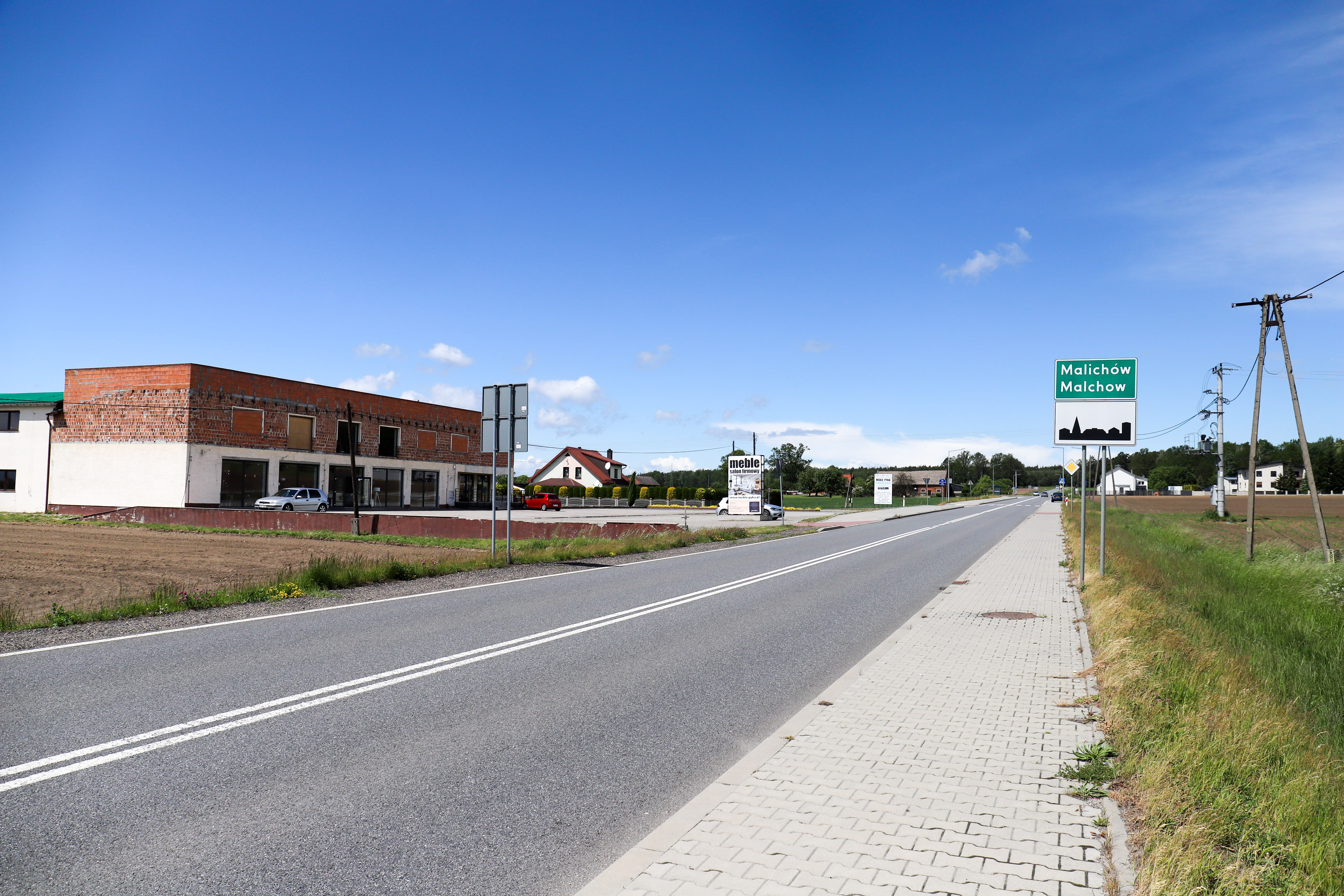

- Location within Poland
- Coordinates: 50°46′28″N 18°26′27″E
- Country: Poland
- Voivodeship: Opole
- County: Olesno
- Gmina: Dobrodzień

Malichów [maˈlixuf] is a village in the administrative district of Gmina Dobrodzień, within Olesno County, Opole Voivodeship, in south-western Poland.
