= Myślina =

- Village
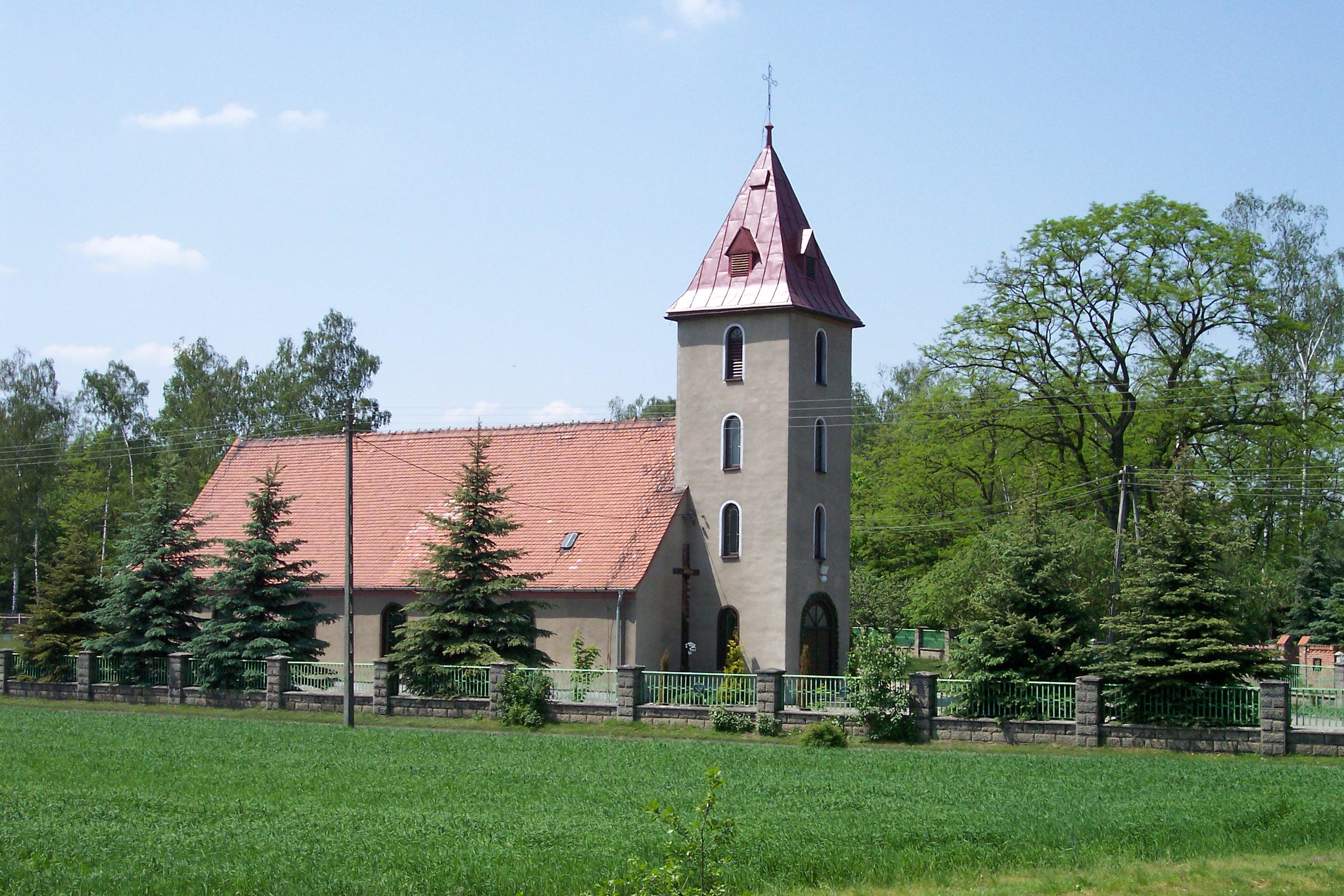
- Catholic church

- Location within Poland
- Coordinates: 50°42′N 18°22′E
- Country: Poland
- Voivodeship: Opole
- County: Olesno
- Gmina: Dobrodzień
- Population: 600

Myślina [mɨˈɕlina] is a village in the administrative district of Gmina Dobrodzień, within Olesno County, Opole Voivodeship, in south-western Poland.
