= Bzinica Stara =

- Village
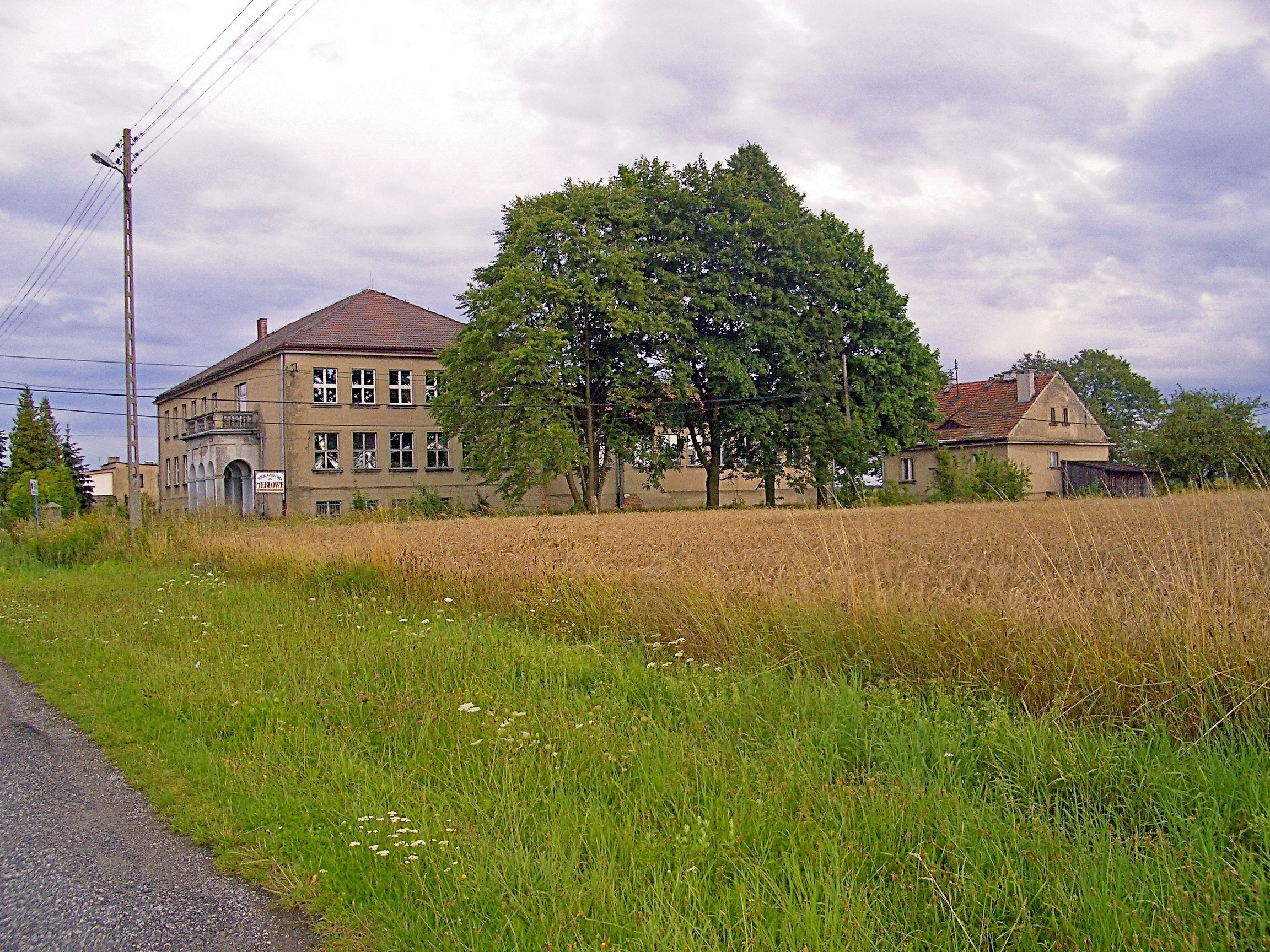

- Location within Poland
- Coordinates: 50°41′21″N 18°27′40″E
- Country: Poland
- Voivodeship: Opole
- County: Olesno
- Gmina: Dobrodzień

Bzinica Stara [bʑiˈnit͡sa ˈstara] is a village in the administrative district of Gmina Dobrodzień, within Olesno County, Opole Voivodeship, in south-western Poland.
