= Zwóz =

- Village
- Location within Poland
- Coordinates: 50°44′36″N 18°30′17″E
- Country: Poland
- Voivodeship: Opole
- County: Olesno
- Gmina: Dobrodzień

Zwóz [zvus] (German Zwoss) is a village in the administrative district of Gmina Dobrodzień, within Olesno County, Opole Voivodeship, in south-western Poland.
