= Gosławice, Opole Voivodeship =

Gosławice
- Village
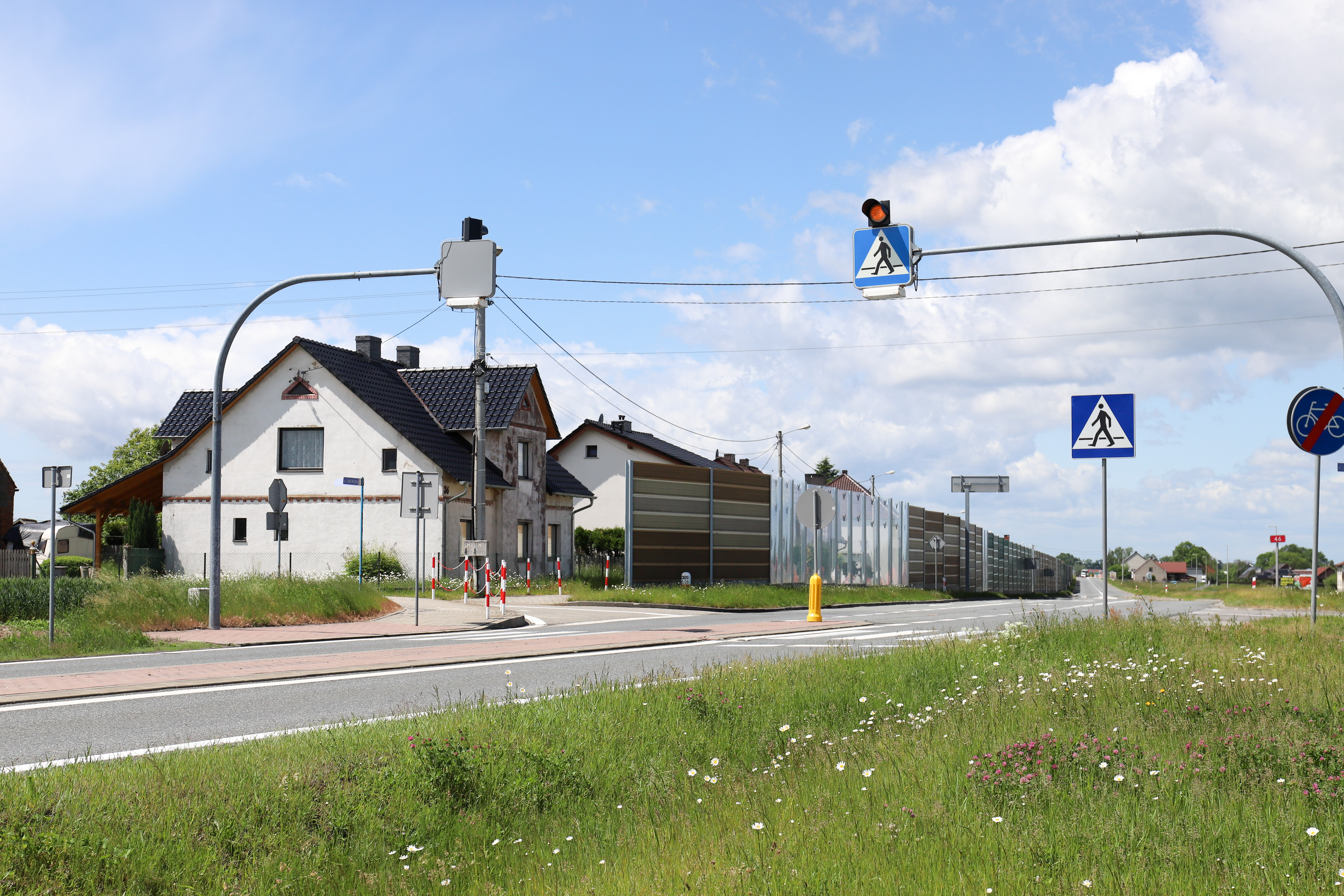

- Location within Poland
- Coordinates: 50°44′N 18°29′E
- Country: Poland
- Voivodeship: Opole
- County: Olesno
- Gmina: Dobrodzień

Gosławice [ɡɔswaˈvit͡sɛ] is a village in the administrative district of Gmina Dobrodzień, within Olesno County, Opole Voivodeship, in south-western Poland.
