= Gmina Dobrodzień =

Gmina Dobrodzień Gemeinde Guttentag Dobrodzień Commune
- Gmina
- Flag Coat of arms

- Location within Opole Voivodeship Location within Poland
- Coordinates (Dobrodzień): 50°43′40″N 18°26′40″E
- Country: Poland
- Voivodeship: Opole
- County: Olesno
- Seat: Dobrodzień

Area
  - Total: 162.84 km^{2} (62.87 sq mi)

Population (2019-06-30)
  - Total: 10,651
  - Density: 65.408/km^{2} (169.41/sq mi)
  - Urban: 3,720
  - Rural: 6,157
- Time zone: UTC+1 (CET)
  - Summer (DST): UTC+2 (CEST)
- Vehicle registration: OOL
- Website: https://dobrodzien.pl

Gmina Dobrodzień (German: Gemeinde Guttentag) is an urban-rural gmina (administrative district) in Olesno County, Opole Voivodeship, in southern Poland. Its seat is the town of Dobrodzień, which lies approximately 17 kilometres (11 mi) south of Olesno and 37 km (23 mi) east of the regional capital Opole.

The gmina covers an area of 162.84 square kilometres (62.9 sq mi), and as of 2019 its total population is 9,877.

Since 2009 the commune has been officially bilingual in Polish and German due to a sizeable German minority in the area, many ethnic Germans have remained despite the area being transferred to Poland after World War II.

== Villages ==
The commune contains the villages and settlements of:

- Dobrodzień
- Bąki
- Błachów
- Bzinica Nowa
- Bzinica Stara
- Główczyce
- Gosławice
- Klekotna
- Kocury
- Kolejka
- Ligota Dobrodzieńska
- Makowczyce
- Malichów
- Myślina
- Pietraszów
- Pludry
- Rzędowice
- Szemrowice
- Turza
- Warłów
- Zwóz

== Neighbouring gminas ==
Gmina Dobrodzień is bordered by the gminas of Ciasna, Kolonowskie, Olesno, Ozimek, Pawonków, Zawadzkie and Zębowice.

== Twin towns – sister cities ==
Gmina Dobrodzień is twinned with:

- Chortkiv, Ukraine
- Haan, Germany
