= Klekotna =

Klekotna Charlottenthal
- Village
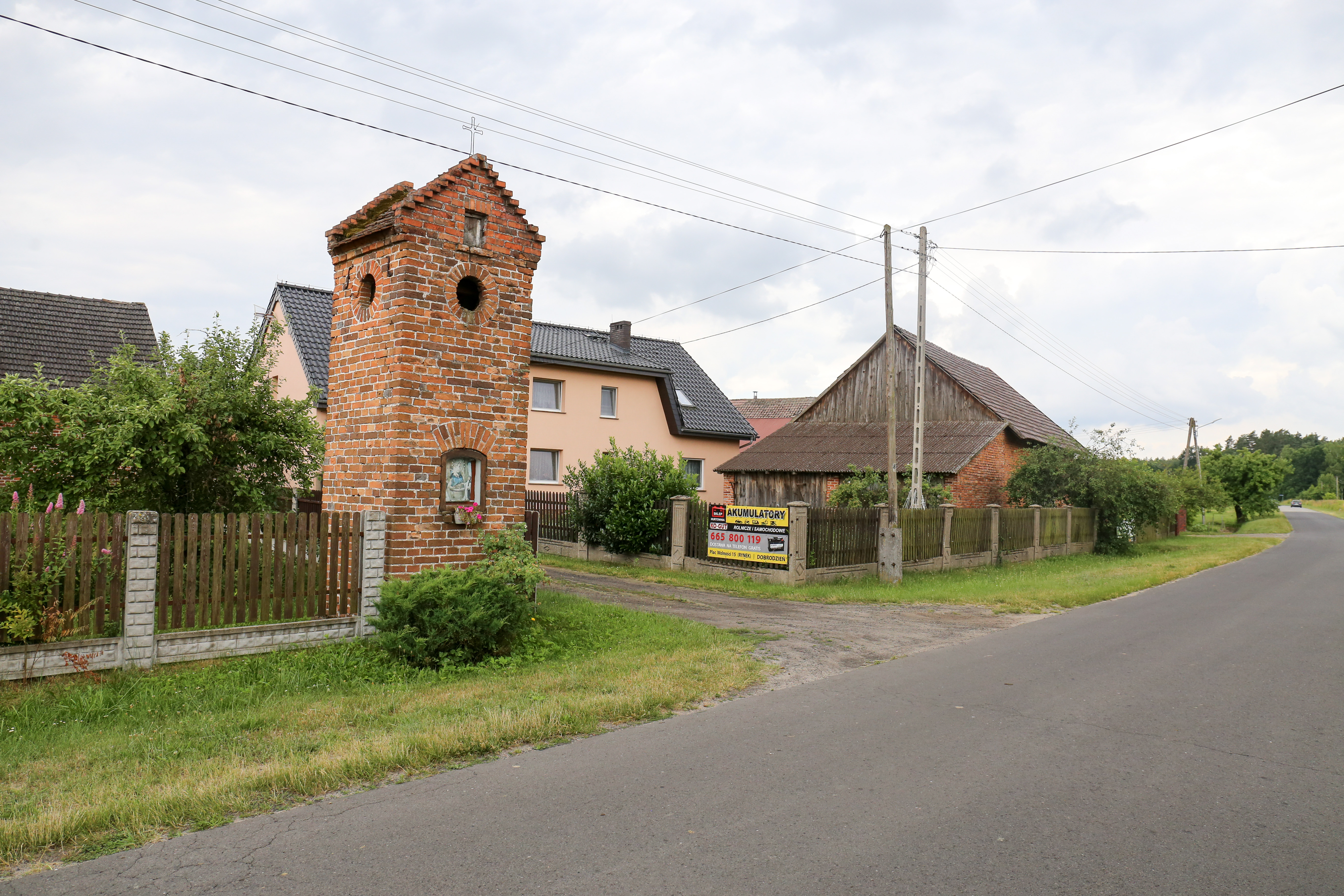

- Location within Poland
- Coordinates: 50°47′36″N 18°30′36″E
- Country: Poland
- Voivodeship: Opole
- County: Olesno
- Gmina: Dobrodzień
- Time zone: UTC+1 (CET)
  - Summer (DST): UTC+2 (CEST)
- Vehicle registration: OOL

Klekotna [klɛˈkɔtna] is a village in the administrative district of Gmina Dobrodzień, within Olesno County, Opole Voivodeship, in southern Poland.

The village is officially bilingual in both Polish and German. There is a sizeable German minority there.
