= Dobrodzień =

Dobrodzień Guttentag
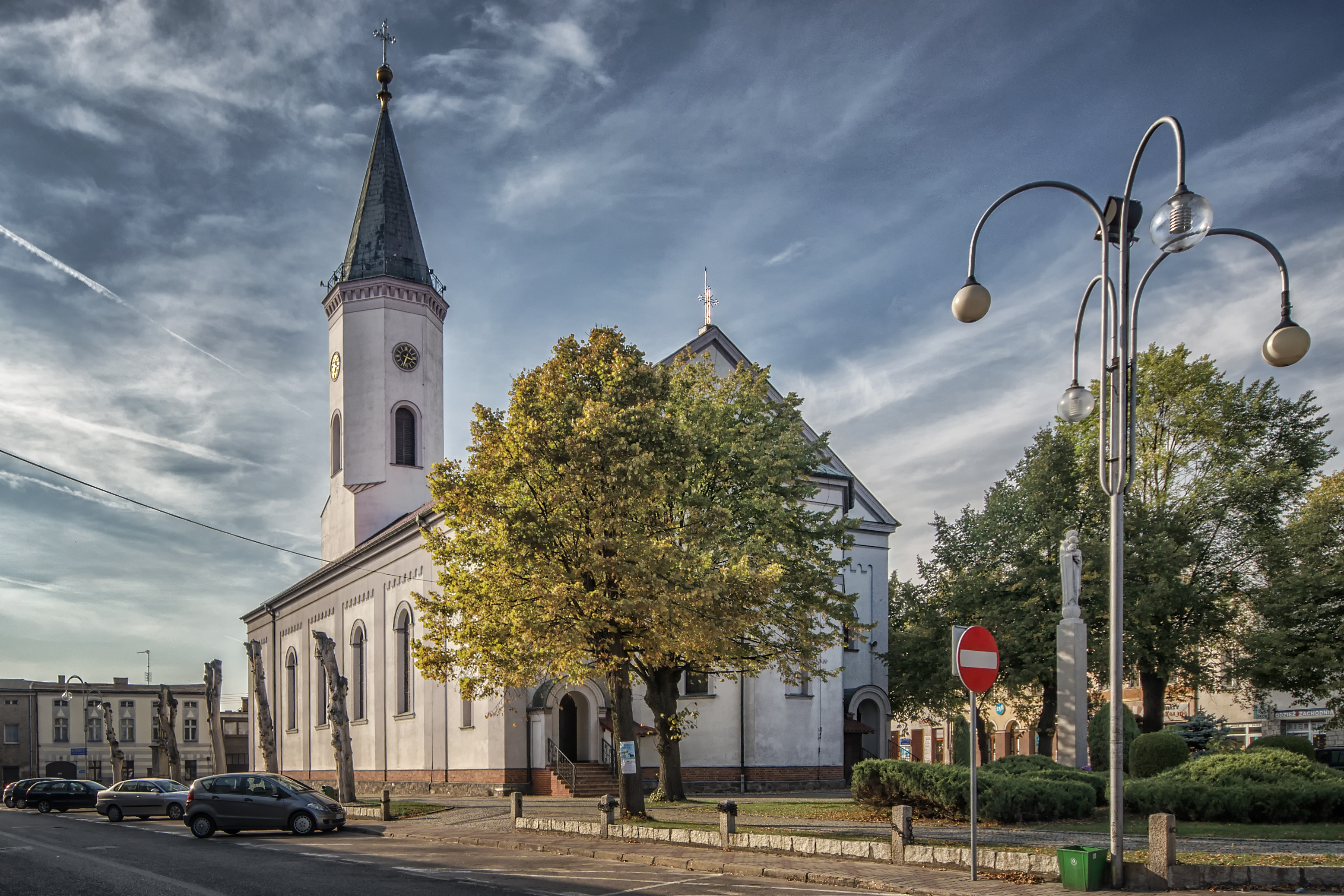
- Saint Mary Magdalene church in Dobrodzień

- Flag Coat of arms

- Location within Poland
- Coordinates: 50°43′40″N 18°26′40″E
- Country: Poland
- Voivodeship: Opole
- County: Olesno
- Gmina: Dobrodzień
- City rights: 1374

Government
  - Mayor: Andrzej Jasiński

Area
  - Total: 19.46 km^{2} (7.51 sq mi)

Population (31 December 2021)
  - Total: 3,650
  - Density: 188/km^{2} (486/sq mi)
- Time zone: UTC+1 (CET)
  - Summer (DST): UTC+2 (CEST)
- Postal code: 46-380
- Area code: +48 34
- Car plates: OOL
- Website: https://dobrodzien.pl

Dobrodzień [dɔˈbrɔd͡ʑɛɲ] (German: Guttentag, Lower Silesian: Guntag, Silesian: Dobrodźyń) is a small town in Olesno County, in Opole Voivodeship, Poland. Located in the historical region of Upper Silesia, it is the administrative seat of Gmina Dobrodzień. As of December 2021, the town has a population of 3,650.

== Name ==
Both names in Polish and German mean "Good day". Dobrodzień is an archaic variant of standard Polish Dzień Dobry, while Guttentag is an archaic variant of standard German Guten Tag.

== History ==
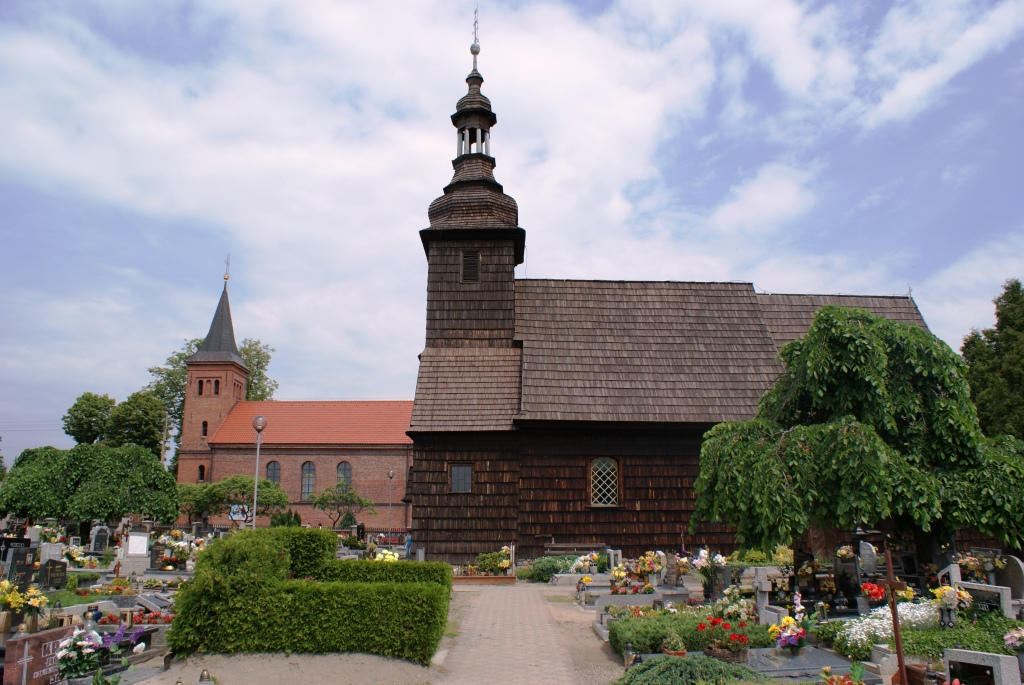
Historic churches of Dobrodzień: the Saint Valentine church in the foreground and the Saint Mary church in the background

The area is documented as part of the Upper Silesian Duchy of Opole of the fragmented Kingdom of Poland, since about 1163 under the rule of Duke Bolesław I the Tall. The name Dobrosin was first recorded in a 1279 deed; the name varied throughout the centuries (Dobradin, Dobrodzen, Dobrodzin, Dobrydzień etc.). It was granted town rights according to Magdeburg law in 1374 by Duke Vladislaus II of Opole, who then vested it with various privileges in 1384. It remained under the rule of the local Polish dukes of the Piast dynasty, although as a fief of the Bohemian Crown from 1327, until the dissolution of the Duchy of Opole and Racibórz in 1532, when it was incorporated into the Habsburg-ruled Kingdom of Bohemia, as part of which it was owned by the Posadowski, Jarocki, Blacha and Blankowski noble families. The first mention of the German name Guttentag occurred in 1636, as a literal translation of the original Polish name. In 1645 along with the former Duchy of Opole and Racibórz it returned to Poland under the House of Vasa, and in 1666 it passed to Bohemia again.

Upon the First Silesian War, in 1742, it was annexed by the Kingdom of Prussia according to the Treaty of Breslau. Incorporated into the Prussian Province of Silesia, it became part of the German Empire in 1871. Despite Germanisation policies, the town has retained its Polish character and its population was predominantly Catholic. In the Catholic church, Polish sermons took place weekly, German ones every month. Small Protestant and Jewish minorities also lived in the town. According to the German census of 1890, Guttentag town had a population of 2,426, of which 1,350 (56%) were Poles. The town suffered a fire in 1846.

After World War I, in the Upper Silesia plebiscite held in March 1921, 79.5% of the citizens of the town came out in favour of a continuance in Germany, and while most parts of the Lubliniec district were reintegrated with the re-established Polish Republic, Dobrodzień, as Guttentag, remained on the German side, within the Prussian Province of Upper Silesia and ended up very close to the new German–Polish border. In May 1921 it was still captured by Polish insurgents during the Third Silesian Uprising, however it remained part of Germany after 1922. Several Polish organizations and enterprises operated in the town in the interbellum, including the Union of Poles in Germany, a Polish scout troop and the Polish Bank Ludowy ("People's Bank"). Polish activists were persecuted since 1937. In the months before the outbreak of World War II, in 1939, the houses of Polish activists and Polish institutions and enterprises were the target of numerous attacks, anonymous threatening letters were sent to Poles, while the police refused protection. After the invasion of Poland, which started World War II, the assets of the Polish bank were confiscated by the German state. Jews, most of whom supported Germany against Poland in the 1921 plebiscite, were also persecuted by the Germans in the 1930s, resulting in their emigration to the west. The synagogue was dismantled by the Germans.

In 1945, as part of Potsdam Agreement by the Allied victors after World War II, the town became part of the Republic of Poland and the historic name Dobrodzień was restored. Up till then the town had a mostly Protestant population, but after the expulsion of most of the German inhabitants, it was resettled with mainly Catholic Poles, many of whom were expelled from former eastern Poland annexed by the Soviet Union, in particular from Barszczowice.

Dobrodzień and most of the surrounding towns are at present officially bilingual in both Polish and German; a sizable German minority (25.3% according to the 2002 census) has continued to settle in the area even after the war.

== Notable people ==
- Abraham Cohn (1832-1897), Jewish-German American Civil War soldier
- Georg Gürich (1859–1938), German geologist
- Oskar Cohn (1869–1934), Jewish-German lawyer and politician
- Anton Korol (1916–1981), Luftwaffe pilot

== Twin towns – sister cities ==
See twin towns of Gmina Dobrodzień.

== Gallery ==
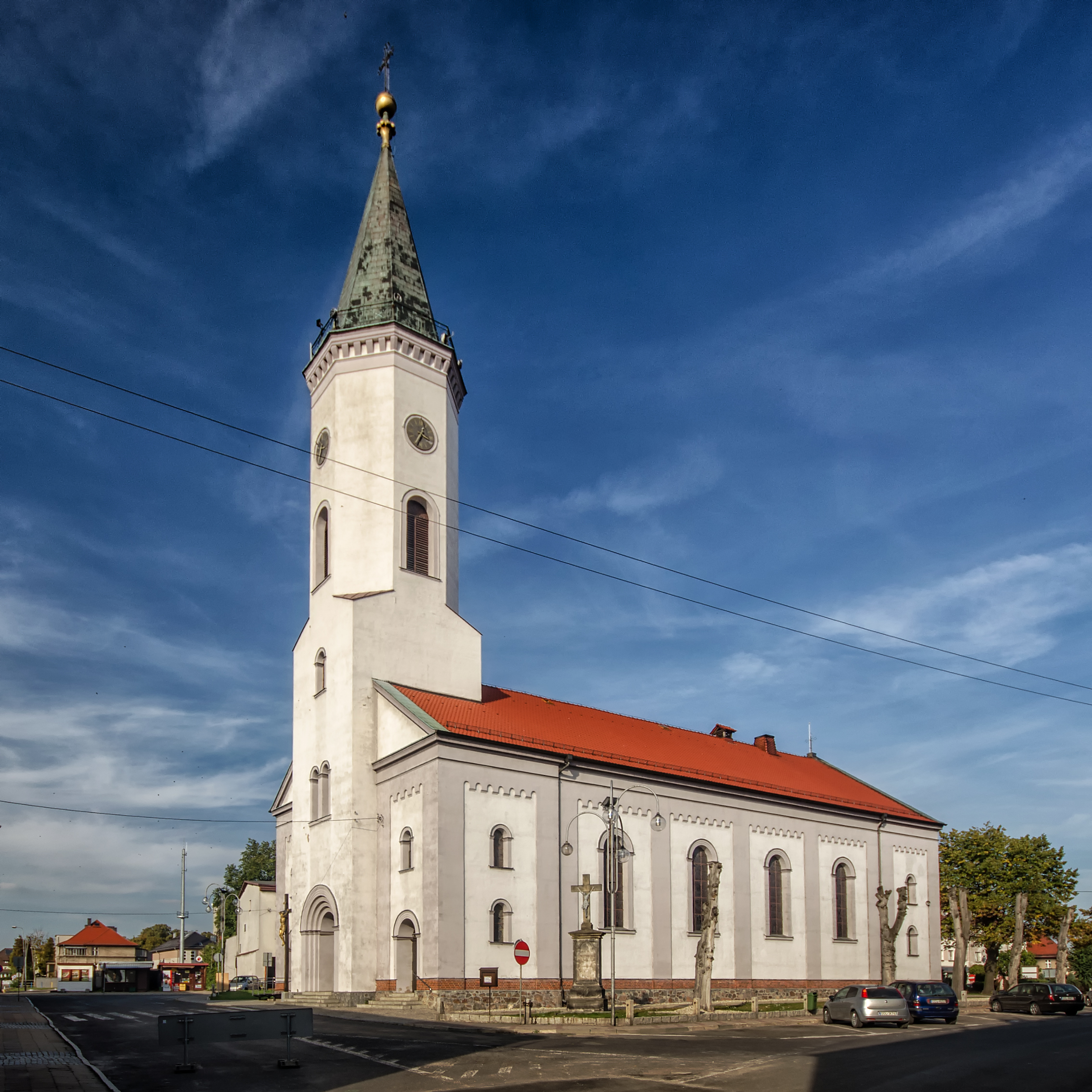
Mary Magdalene Church

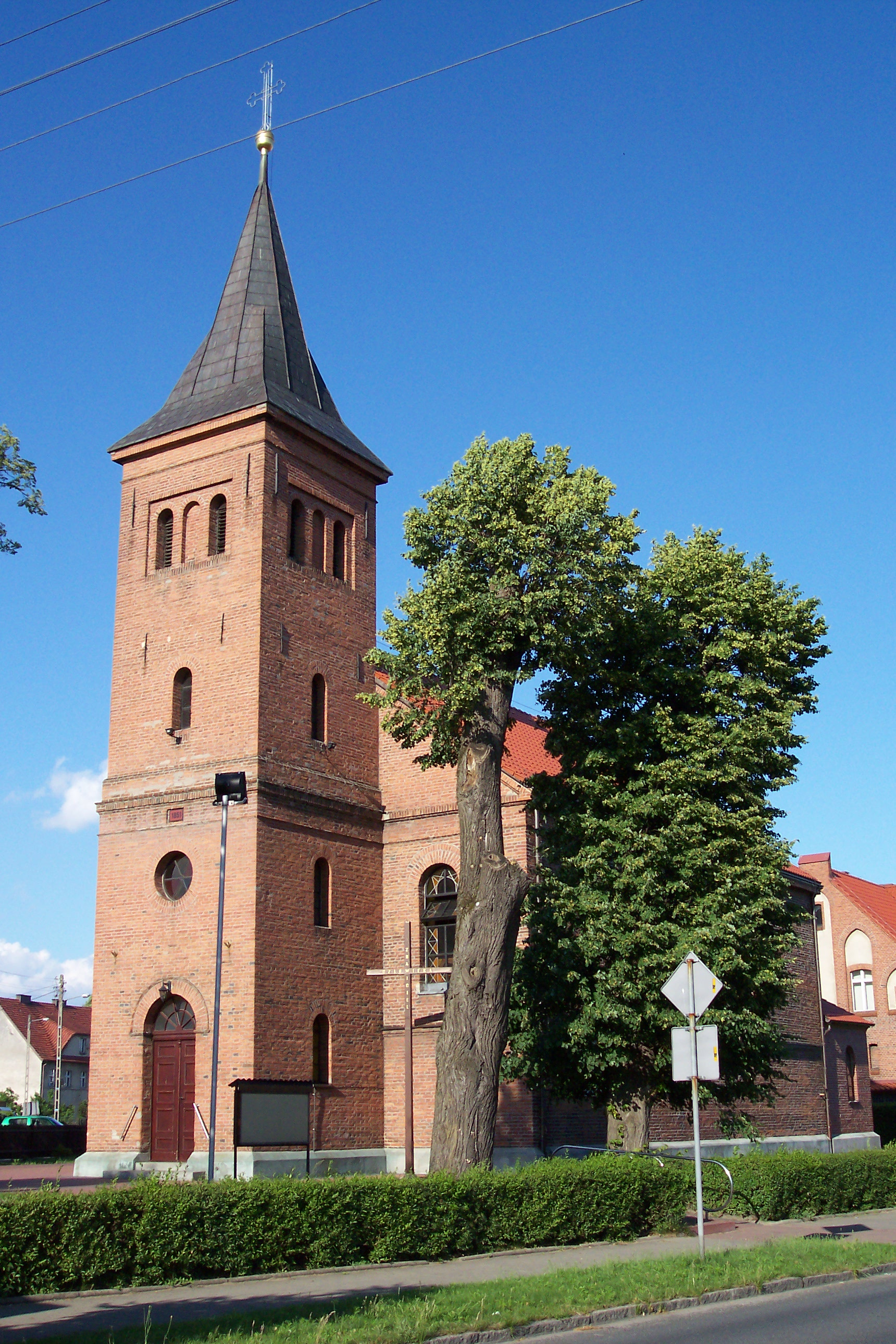
Saint Mary Church

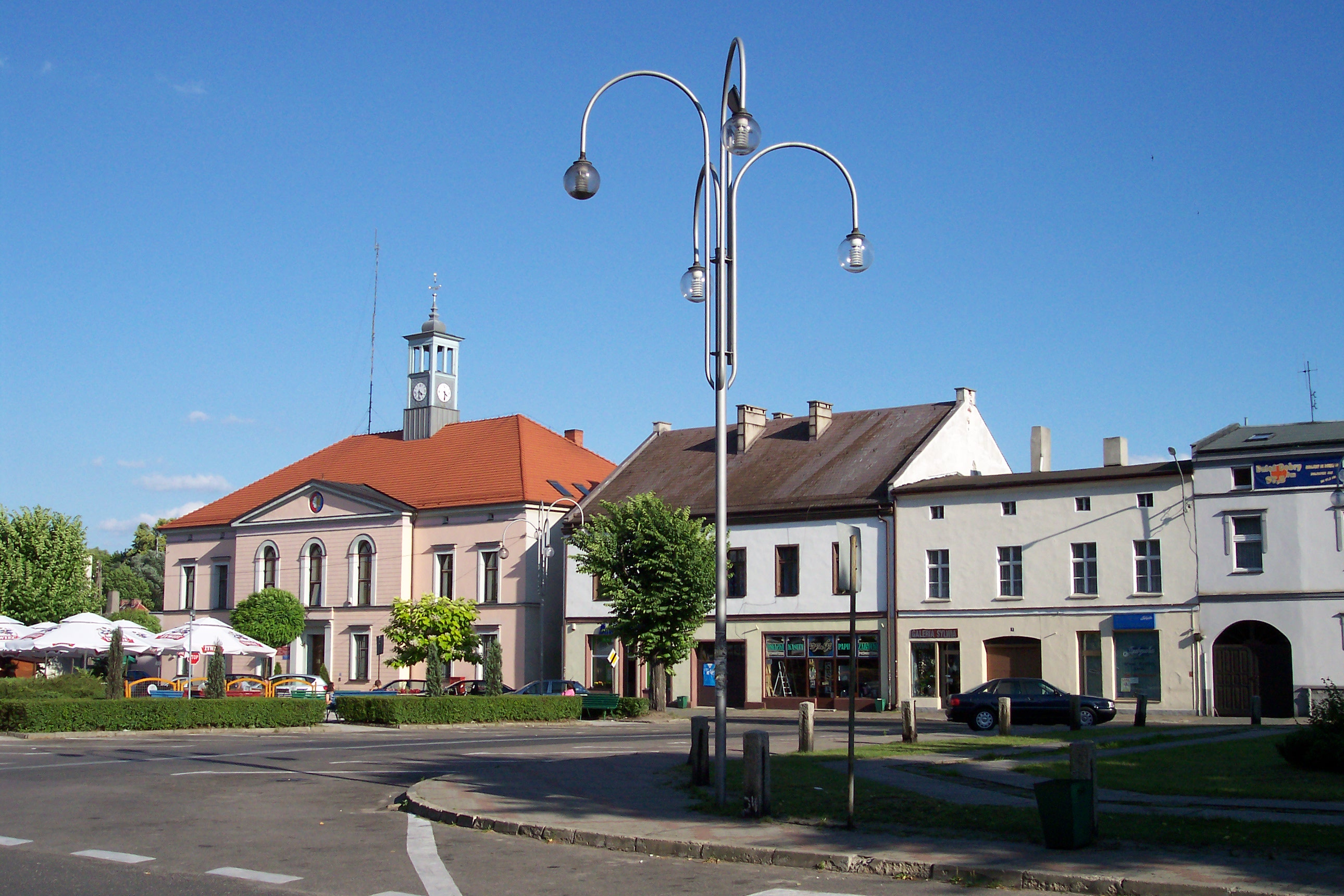
Market square (Rynek) with the town hall (Ratusz)

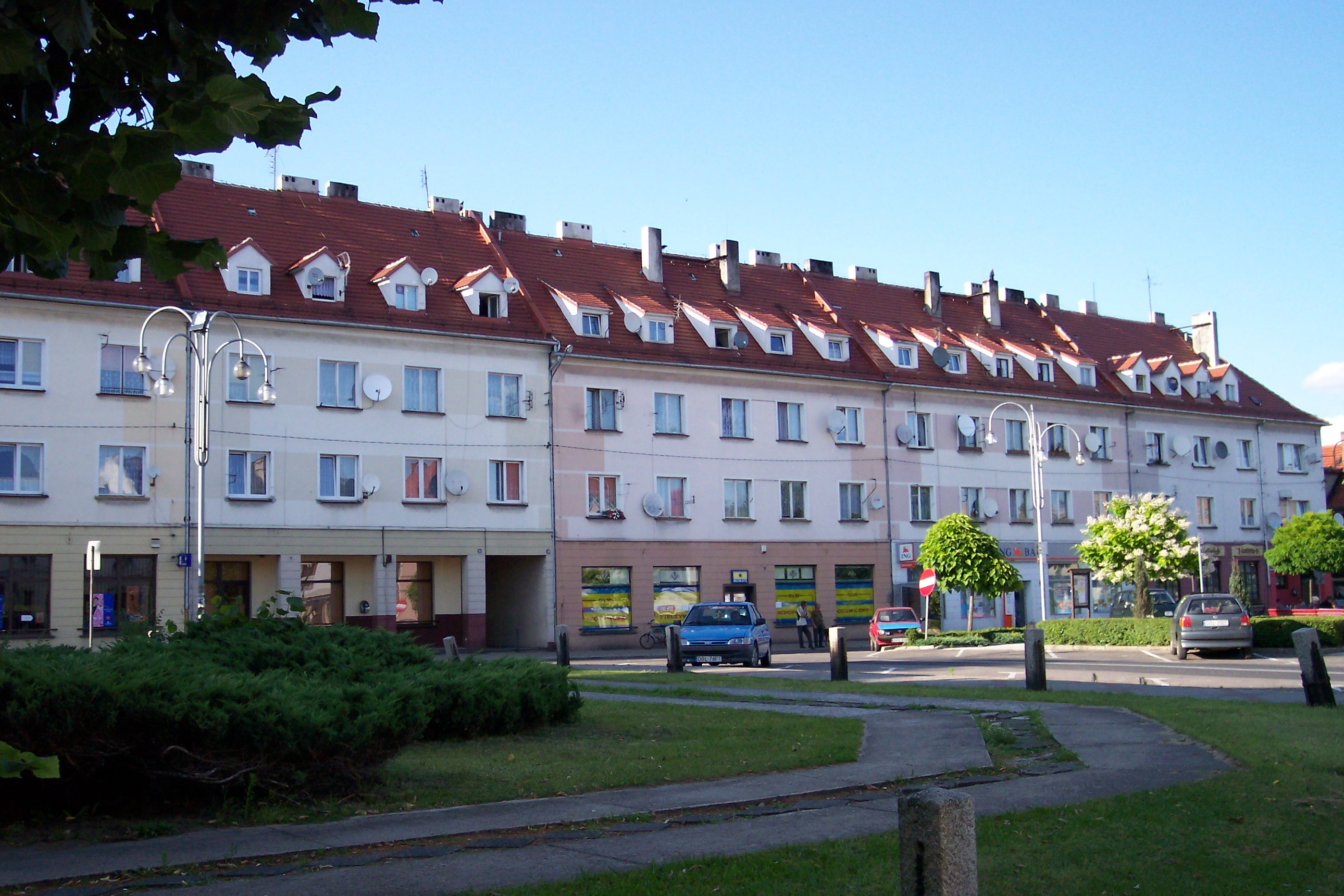
Market square

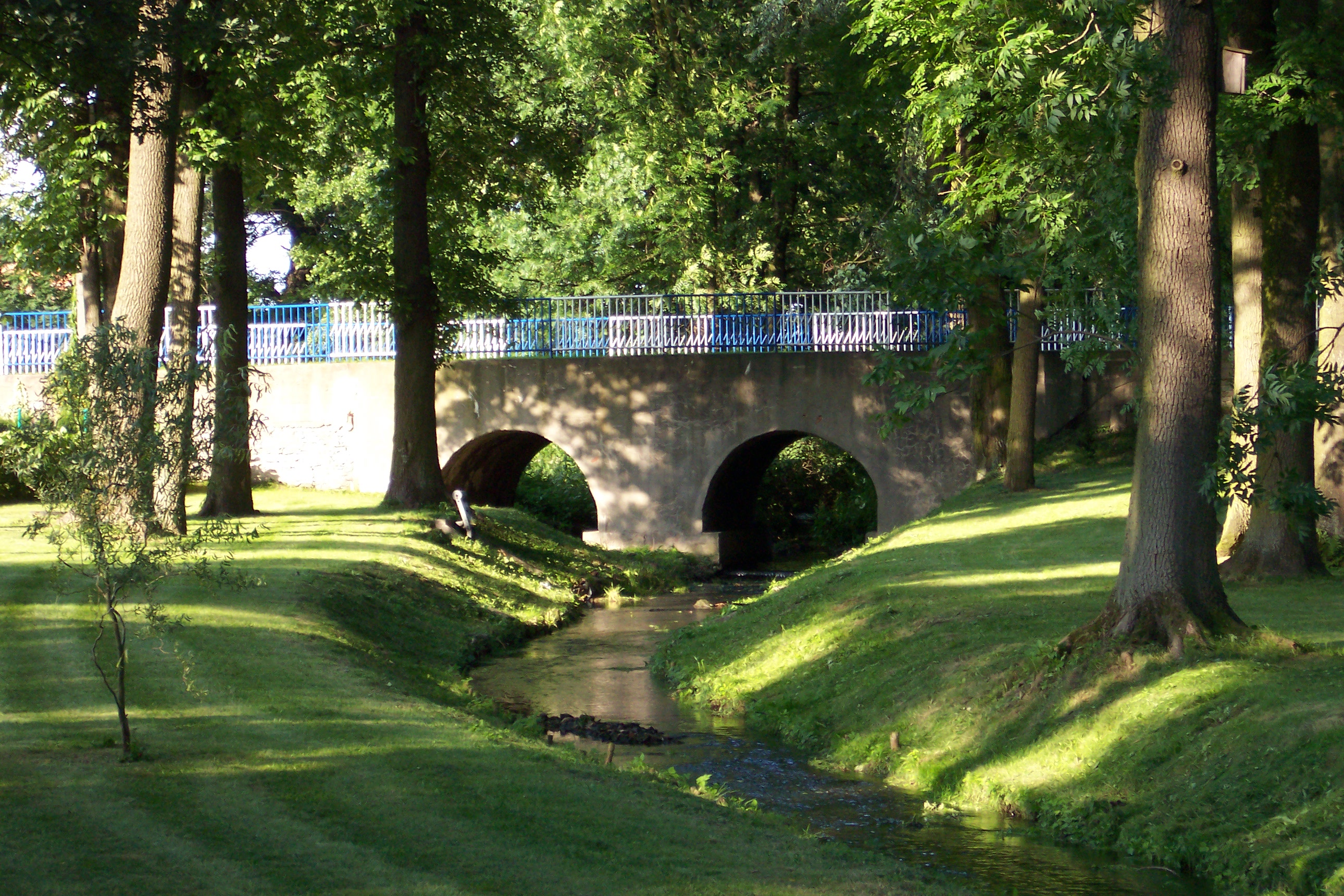
17th-century bridge
