= Abdolbaghi Darvish =

Iranian Air Force pilot

- Born: 1948; Nowshahr, Iran
- Died: 1986 (aged 37–38); Ahwaz, Iran
- Burial place: Tehran
- Military career
- Allegiance: Iran
- Branch: Air Force
- Rank: Colonel
- Conflicts: Iran–Iraq War †

Abdolbaghi Darvish (Persian: عبدالباقی درویش; 26 April 1948 – 20 February 1986) was an Iranian Air Force pilot who served during the Iran–Iraq War.

== Early life ==
He was born in 1948 in Nowshahr. After finishing school, he had accepted in Iran's air force college and after that for advance training he was sent to the United States in 1969.

== End of life ==
On 20 February 1986, Darvish was shot down by an Iraqi MiG-23ML while flying his Iranian F27-600. All 51 crew and passengers were killed. The aircraft was carrying a delegation of military and government officials on a mission. He was posthumously promoted to the rank of Major General.

== See also ==
- Iran–Iraq War
