= Maghlatay ibn Qalij =

Islamic scholar and author

Mughalṭāy ibn Qalīj

Personal life
- Born: Mughalṭāy ibn Qalīj; 1291
- Died: 1361 (aged 69–70) Cairo, Egypt
- Notable works: Ikmāl Tahdhīb al-Kamāl, Al-Wāḍiḥ al-Mubīn, Mukhtaṣar Tārīkh al-Khulafāʾ
- Known for: Islamic scholarship, Hadith studies, Historical and biographical writings
- Occupation: Scholar, Author, Historian

Religious life
- Religion: Islam
- Denomination: Sunni
- Jurisprudence: Hanafi
- Creed: Ash'ari

Mughalṭāy ibn Qalīj (1291-1361) was an Islamic scholar and author during the Mamluk era. His works span various topics, including biographical dictionaries, historical accounts, and religious studies. His works, such as Ikmāl Tahdhīb al-Kamāl and Al-Wāḍiḥ al-Mubīn, showcase his versatility, encompassing hadith studies, history, and literature. Qalīj's scholarly pursuits and writings remain invaluable resources for understanding medieval Islamic scholarship and the Mamluk Sultanate's rich intellectual traditions.

== Biography ==
Qalij was born in the late 13th century and lived until the mid-14th century. He was active during the Mamluk Sultanate, deeply engaged in his time's intellectual traditions.

Qalij made contributions to Islamic scholarship through his documentation and analysis of historical figures, events, and religious concepts. His focus on biographical dictionaries preserved important information about the narrators of hadith. Additionally, his exploration of martyrdom in love (shuhada' al-hubb) demonstrates his versatility as a writer, bridging gaps between religious devotion and human emotion.

He died in Cairo in 762 AH (1361 CE).

== Literary contributions ==
Qalīj authored several influential books across different genres. Some of his most notable works include:

- Ikmāl Tahdhīb al-Kamāl fī Asmāʼ al-Rijāl:

It is a biographical dictionary of narrators of Hadiths. It serves as a continuation and completion of earlier efforts in this field, such as Ibn Hajar al-Asqalani's Tahdhīb al-Kamāl. The book has been described as a "treasure trove" containing excerpts from many now-lost manuscripts. A modern edition of the text was published in 2001 by al-Fārūq al-Ḥadīthah lil-Ṭibāʻah wa-al-Nashr.

- Al-Wāḍiḥ al-Mubīn fī Dhikr Man Istashhada min al-Muḥibbīn:

This work focuses on individuals who died for love, blending history, literature, and spirituality. Edited versions of the manuscript exist in Istanbul.

- Mukhtaṣar Tārīkh al-Khulafāʾ

A concise history of the caliphs, this book provides insights into the political and religious leadership of the early Islamic period. Published by Dar al-Fajr lil-Nashr wa-al-Tawzi in 2001.

- 'Al-Taḥfah al-Jasīmah fī Dhikr Ḥalīmah' (The Treasured Treatise on Halimah):

which explores themes related to Halima, the wet nurse of Prophet Muhammad.

- Al-Durr al-Manẓūm min Kalām al-Muṣṭafá al-Maʿṣūm:

A classical work on Hadith, this text organizes Prophetic sayings according to subjects of Islamic law. It reflects Mughalṭāy’s systematic approach to compiling religious knowledge and demonstrates his expertise in structuring legal and theological material.

- Al-Ishārah ilá Sīrat al-Muṣṭafá wa-Tārīkh Man Baʿdahu min al-Khilāfā:

This book, published in 1996, combines a biography of Prophet Muhammad with a historical account of the caliphs who succeeded him.
