= Baqi, South Khorasan =

Baqi بقی
- Village
- Location within Iran
- Coordinates: 33°15′22″N 59°08′07″E
- Country: Iran
- Province: South Khorasan
- County: Birjand
- Bakhsh: Central
- Rural District: Fasharud

Population (2016)
  - Total: 65
- Time zone: UTC+3:30 (IRST)
  - Summer (DST): UTC+4:30 (IRDT)

Baqi (Persian: بقی, also Romanized as Baqī) is a village in Fasharud Rural District, in the Central District of Birjand County, South Khorasan Province, Iran. At the 2016 census, its population was 65, in 24 families.
