= Bąki, Opole Voivodeship =

Bąki
- Village
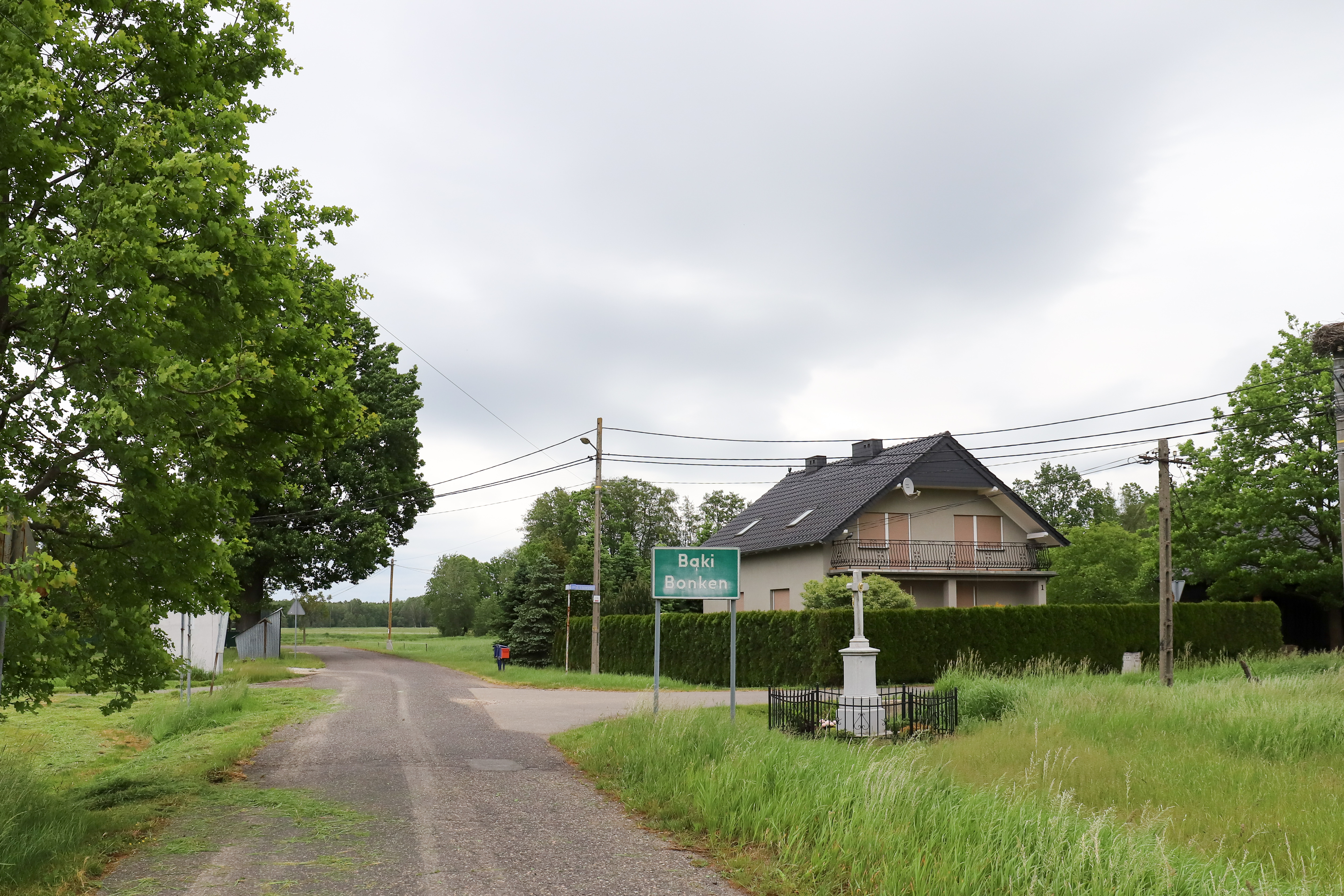

- Location within Poland
- Coordinates: 50°42′15″N 18°28′49″E
- Country: Poland
- Voivodeship: Opole
- County: Olesno
- Gmina: Dobrodzień

Bąki [ˈbɔnki] is a village in the administrative district of Gmina Dobrodzień, within Olesno County, Opole Voivodeship, in south-western Poland.
