= Abdul Baqi Jammoh =

Jordanian politician (1922–2016)

Minister of State for Legal and Parliamentary Affairs
- In office 1994–1995

Minister of State for Parliamentary Affairs
- In office 1989–1991

Personal details
- Born: 14 December 1922 Zarqa, Jordan
- Died: 11 May 2016 (aged 93)
- Education: Al-Azhar University
- Occupation: Politician

Abdul Baqi Jammoh (Chechen: Ӏабдул-Бакъи Джамо, romanized: Jabdul-Baq̇i Dƶamo; 14 December 1922 – 11 May 2016), also known as Jammu, was a Jordanian politician of Chechen descent.

== Career ==
Abdulbaki's ancestors moved from the mountain village of Khoy to the village of Gilany. Representative of the Chechen Yalkhoy taip.

He served in both houses of the Parliament of Jordan, several times as a member of the House of Deputies and as member of the Senate between 1997 and 2001. During his time in the Senate Jammoh was part of the Islamist faction. Jammoh was member of the cabinet twice. He first served as Minister of state for parliamentary affairs between 1989 and 1991. His second position was that of Minister of state for legal and parliamentary affairs between 1994 and 1995. Jammoh was born in Zarqa.
