= Baki Sarısakal =

Turkish researcher, historian and author (born 1954)

Baki Sarısakal (born 1954) is a Turkish researcher, historian and author.

== Biography ==
Baki Sarısakal was born in Samsun in 1954. He completed his primary and secondary education at Samsun. He graduated from 19 Mayıs (19 May) Highschool and then graduated from the Faculty of Languages, History and Geography of Ankara University. He prepared his thesis is named Political partys's social basisc in Turkey under Kurtuluş Kayalı. He learned from Afet İnan, Emre Kongar, Erdal Yavuz, Metin and Şerafettin Turan, Kurtuluş Kayali, Nejat Kaymaz. He worked being a history teacher at Edirne Pasinler Erzurum Aşkale and Pasinler high schools and he retired from Samsun Trade and Anatolian Trade vocational high school. His articles were published variously national and local newspaper and magazines. He contributed enlightening of history of Samsun writing name tags of historical artifacts which are located in different situations. He consulted on Samsun protocol road 'Kurtuluş wharf', Samsun Gazi Museum's restoration works and city culture studies. He is married and has two sons.

== Sarısakal's published books ==
1. Bir kentin tarihi: Samsun (I. kitap) (A Town's History: Samsun (1st book))
2. Bir kentin tarihi: Samsun (II. kitap) (A Town's History: Samsun (2nd book))
3. Samsun basın tarihi (Samsun Press History)
4. Samsun sağlık tarihi (Samsun Healthy History)
5. Samsun polis tarih (Samsun Police Forces History)
6. Samsun belediye tarihi (Samsun Municipality History)
7. Samsun eğlence tarihi (Samsun Entertainment History)
8. Belge ve tanıklarla Samsun’da mübadele (Population Exchange in Samsun with Documents and Witnesses)
9. Samsun’da unutulmayan olaylar (Unforgotton events in Samsun)(1st book)
10. Belge ve tanıklarla Samsun’dan Ankara’ya (19 mayıs 1919-23 nisan 1920) (I. kitap) (To Ankara From Samsun with Documents and Witnesses (19 May 1919 – 23 April 1920)) (1st book)
11. Belge ve tanıklarla Samsun’dan Ankara’ya (19 mayıs 1919-23 nisan 1920) (II. kitap) (To Ankara From Samsun with Documents and Witnesses (19 May 1919 – 23 April 1920)) (2nd book)
