= Baki Jashari =

Kosovar composer and music educator (born 1960)

Baki Jashari (born 1960 in Pristina) is a Kosovar composer, conductor, and music educator who directed the Kosovo Philharmonic from 2006 to 2024. He studied composition at the Academy of Music at Ljubljana, graduating in 1984. He would later move back to Ljubljana, conducting the academy's string orchestra from 1990 to 2000. He was also director of the Professional Choir of Radio Television of Pristina, from 1987 to 1990.

== Personal life ==
Jashari's wife, Elife Podvorica, and his daughter, Arta Jashari, are both sopranos. Jashari is afflicted with diabetes and a heart ailment, and came with a bout of COVID-19 in 2020, but was nursed back to health by Arta.
