= Główczyce, Opole Voivodeship =

Główczyce
- Village
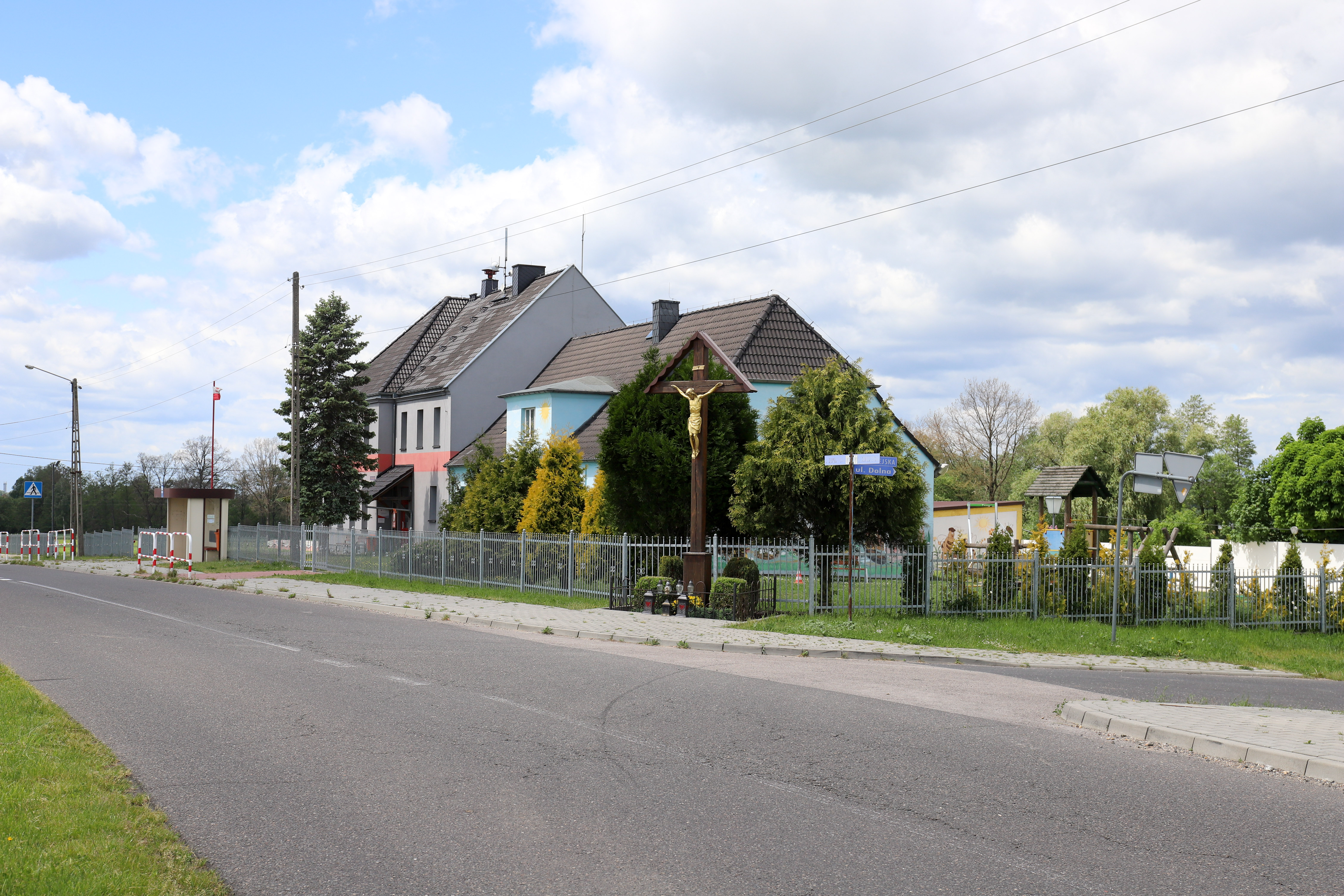

- Location within Poland
- Coordinates: 50°44′14″N 18°30′50″E
- Country: Poland
- Voivodeship: Opole
- County: Olesno
- Gmina: Dobrodzień

Główczyce [ɡwufˈt͡ʂɨt͡sɛ] is a village in the administrative district of Gmina Dobrodzień, within Olesno County, Opole Voivodeship, in south-western Poland.
