= Kolejka, Opole Voivodeship =

Kolejka
- Village
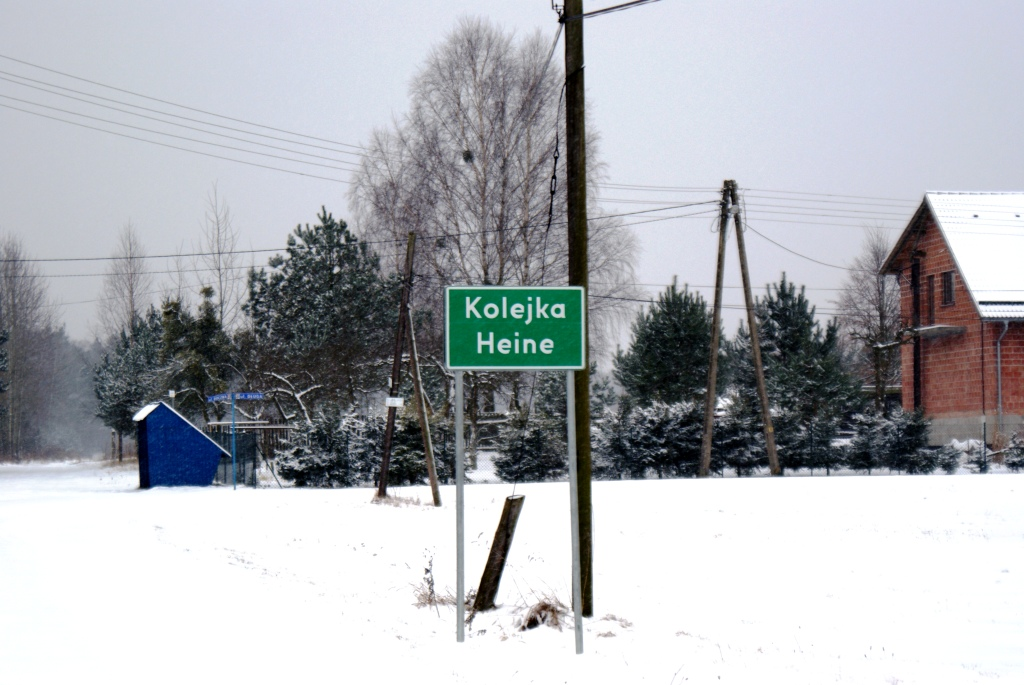

- Location within Poland
- Coordinates: 50°41′12″N 18°26′23″E
- Country: Poland
- Voivodeship: Opole
- County: Olesno
- Gmina: Dobrodzień

Kolejka [kɔˈlɛi̯ka] (German: Heine) is a village in the administrative district of Gmina Dobrodzień, within Olesno County, Opole Voivodeship, in south-western Poland.
