= Sajjadullah Baqi =

Pakistani businessman and politician

Sajjad Ullah Baqi

Member of the Provincial Assembly of Khyber Pakhtunkhwa
- In office 2011–2013
- Constituency: PK-61
- In office 2024–2029
- Constituency: PK-32

Personal details
- Born: April 4, 1979 (age 47) Peshawar, Pakistan
- Party: Jamiat Ulema-e-Islam (F)
- Children: Aamir Sajjad Baqi
- Education: University of Engineering and Technology, Peshawar
- Occupation: Businessman, politician
- Profession: Construction

Sajjad Ullah Baqi (born 4 April 1979) is a Pakistani politician and businessman from Kohistan district.He is the son of late Moulana Abdul Baqi Ex Provincial Minister NWFP. Sajjad Ullah Baqi was born on 4 April 1979 in Peshawar. He attended University Public School Peshawar and then University of Engineering and Technology Peshawar, After completion of studies he started his own business, A construction firm named (Rustum Associates) which is among the top construction companies in Pakistan. He entered politics by contesting in the 2002 general elections as an independent candidate on PK 61, he was unsuccessful in winning the seat. He again contested in the by-elections of 2011 and won the seat. He is currently affiliated with Jamiat Ulema-e-Islam (F).He is considered to be in the list of influential businessmen in Pakistan.

== Family ==
Sajjad Ullah hails from a prominent political family of Kohistan District. His father Moulana Abdul Baqi won the first ever election on PF35 Swat (currently divided into Pk 61 Pk 62 and Pk 63) after accession of Swat (princely State) to Pakistan and after the end of One Unit program in 1970.

Moulana Abdul Baqi served as Provincial Minister for over fourteen years on different occasions from 1972 to 1990. Moulana Abdul Baqi won the seat as an independent candidate and later Joined Mufti Mahmood. With the help of Moulana Abdul Baqi's led group which included four other successful independent candidates NAP and JUI formed Government in 1972. Moulana's Younger brother Moulana Obaid Ullah too was elected member of the provincial assembly in 1977 general election but the assembly was dissolved after three months by Zia-ul-Haq, Moulana Obaid Ullah later became District Nazim of Kohistan In 2001 and once again member provincial Assembly in 2008. Moulana Abdul Baqi's and Moulana Obaid Ullah's Younger brother Mehboob Ullah Jan won the 2008 election and became Member of the National Assembly.

== Member Provincial Assembly ==
Sajjad Ullah as Member Provincial Assembly KPK visited the Islamic republic of Iran on invitation of the Iranian consulate to attend a conference in 2012, he was also part of the parliamentary delegation representing Pakistan at the 2012 Summer Olympics in London, England.
