= Muhammad Fuad Abdul Baqi =

Egyptian Islamic scholar

Muḥammad Fu'ād ʿAbd al-Baqī (Mit Helfa, Qalyub, 1882 – Cairo, 1968) was a prolific Egyptian scholar of Islam, a poet and a translator from French and English. He wrote and compiled many books related to the Qur'an and the sunnah, including indices which give the reader access to the hadith of the Islamic prophet Muhammad.

As editor, his 1955 Cairo publication provided the standard topical classification of hadith Arabic text in Sahih Muslim. The work was reprinted many times. Likewise his 1952-53 publication in 2 volumes provides the standard for Sunan ibn Majah.

== Books ==
His works include:

1. Al-Muʿjam al-Mufahras li-Alfāẓ al-Qur'an al-Karīm, a thorough concordance of the Qur’ān.
2. Jamīʿa Masaned Saheeh Al-Bukhari, Bukhārī's Classified Hadith.
3. Miftāḥ Kunūz al-Sunnah, 1934, Arabic translation from the English of ARENT JAN WENSINCK's "Handbook of Early Muhammadan Tradition" (Leiden, 1927).
4. Al-Lu'lu wa-al-Marjān, a collection of ahadith from Sahih Al-Bukhari and Sahih Muslim.
5. A translation of Al-Muʿjam al-Mufahras in the vocabulary of Hadith.
