= Abdul Baqi (Pakistani politician) =

Pakistani politician

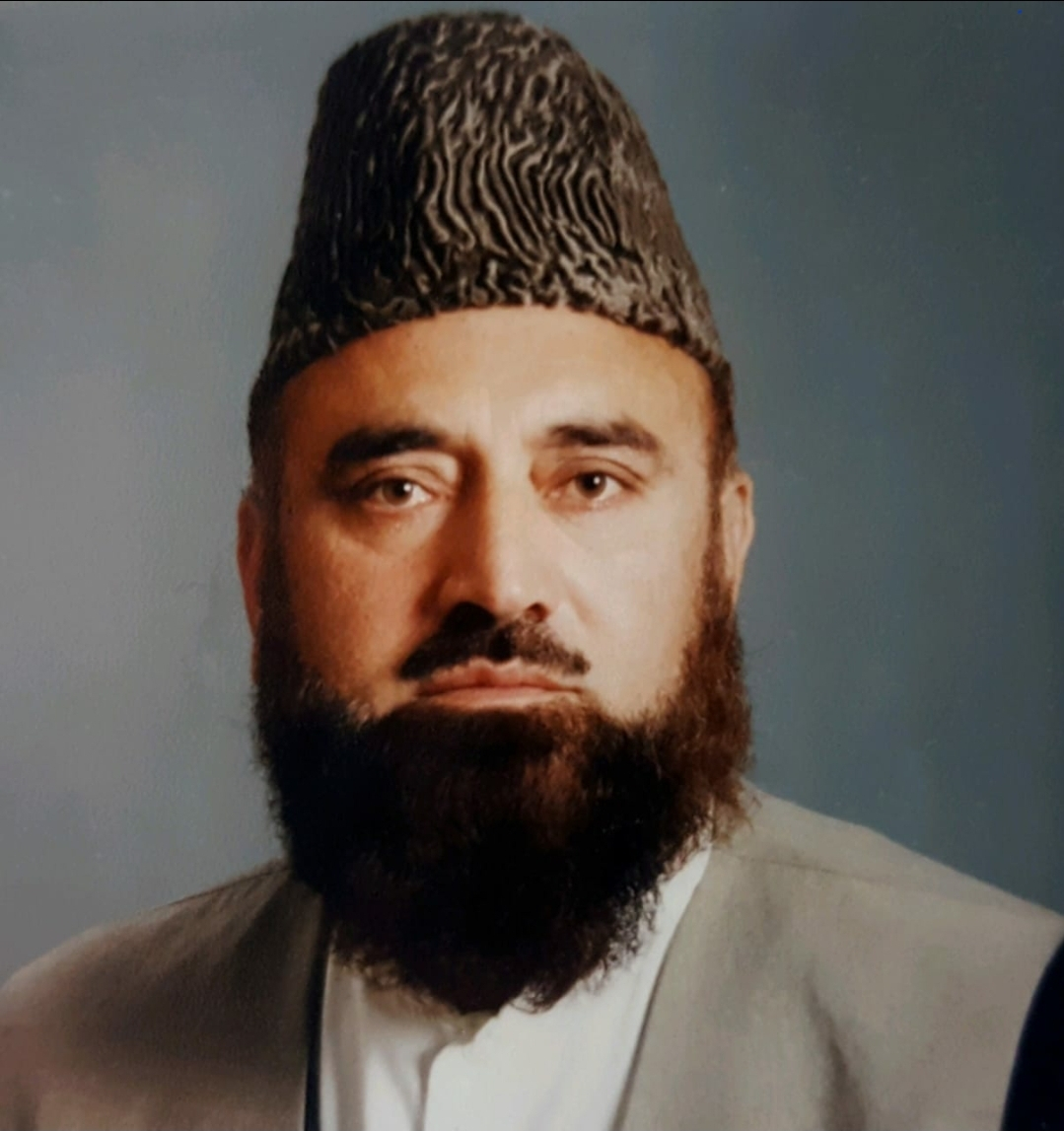

Molana Abdul Baqi (1939–2001) was a prominent political figure of North West Frontier Province, Pakistan during the 1970s, 80 and 90s. He was elected as Member of the Provincial Assembly from the constituency of PF-35, Swat 2, in the 1970 General Elections and appointed as Senior Provincial Minister in Mufti Mehmood's cabinet, the then Chief Minister of North West Frontier Province (Khyber Pakhtunkhwa) of Pakistan.He remained Minister from 1972 till 1977. He also served in the selected Provincial Cabinet of General Zia-ul-Haq from 1980 to 1985. In 1985 non party based elections were held in which he was again elected member of provincial assembly and served as Minister of Religious Affairs and Revenue. In 1988 early elections were called he contested for the Provincial Assembly on the ticket of IJI and was successful, again he served as Provincial Minister for two years until 1990 when assemblies were dissolved. Molana Abdul Baqi's efforts unified the divided Kohistan into one administrative unit, part of which was previously under the administration of Swat Princely State and part was a belt of Tribal settlements without any rit of the government. Kohistan achieved the status of a District in 1975 after protests led by Molana Abdul Baqi . He was also the chairman of Motamar-e-alam e Islam for 15 years.

Death: He died in Abbottabad on 24 June 2001, due to cardiac arrest.

Successors: His younger brothers Moulana Ubaidullah and Mehboobullah Jan got elected as members of the Provincial and National assemblies from PF-61 and NA-23 Kohistan respectively in the February 2008 General Elections. Moulana Ubaidullah died on 7th Oct 2011.

After the death of his younger brother Molvi Ubaidullah, his son Sajjad Ullah Baqi was elected as MPA in 2011.and in 2024 his son sajjad ullah baqi elected as MPA.he contest election on JUI ticket
