= Koj =

Surname

Koj is a surname. It may have multiple origins. Some surname references list it as a possible variant romanization of Chinese surnames including Guo and Gao, and also as a Dutch or Ashkenazic Jewish variant of De Koe.

== People ==
People with the surname include:

- Aleksander Koj (1935–2016), Polish physician, biochemist, academic and former rector of the Jagiellonian University
- Michał Koj (born 1993), Polish footballer
- Sabah Koj (born c. 1998), South Sudanese-Australian fashion model
