= Jacob Mordecai Löwinsohn =

Russo-Polish scholar and journalist

- Born: 1832; Grodno, Russian Empire
- Died: 13 February 1878 (aged 45–46); Warsaw, Russian Poland
- Writing career
- Pen name: ימ״ל, י.מ.ל.

Jacob Mordecai ben Judah Löb Löwinsohn (Hebrew: יעקב מרדכי בן יהודה לייב לעווינזאהן, romanized: Yaʻakov Mordekhai ben Yehudah Leyb Levinzohn; 14 December 1832 – 13 February 1878) was a Russo-Polish scholar and journalist.

== Biography ==
A son of Rabbi Judah Löb, rosh beit din of Grodno, Löwinsohn was trained in Talmud, and then studied Russian, German, Polish, and French, which he mastered in a very short time. Thus equipped he entered upon a journalistic career. He published numerous articles in Russian papers, and when, in 1862, Daniel Neufeldt founded the Jutrzenka, Löwinsohn became an active collaborator on it, always defending the interests of his coreligionists. He was a great controversialist, and had heated discussions with Hirsch Kalischer in Ha-Maggid, and with L. J. Shapiro in the Jutrzenka.

He settled in Serhei, Suwalki Governorate, where he made the acquaintance of David Gordon, editor of Ha-Maggid, and Rabbi Ḥayyim Fillippower. About 1868 he passed his examination at the Rabbinical Seminary of Vilna, where he was ordained rabbi; but he never accepted a rabbinate.

Of his first work, Ha-Adam be-Ẓelem Elohim (Königsberg, 1855), only a limited number of copies were printed, which he distributed among his friends. His numerous articles and essays on Jewish literature and science he published under the pen name Y. M. L. (ימ״ל or י.מ.ל.).
