= Kozioł =

Kozioł or Koziol may refer to:

== Places ==
- Kozioł, Lublin Voivodeship (east Poland)
- Kozioł, Podlaskie Voivodeship (north-east Poland)

== Other uses ==
- Kozioł (bagpipe), a family of bagpipes played in Poland
- Kozioł (surname)

== See also ==
- Kozieł (south-west Poland)
