= Kowale, Opole Voivodeship =

Kowale
- Village
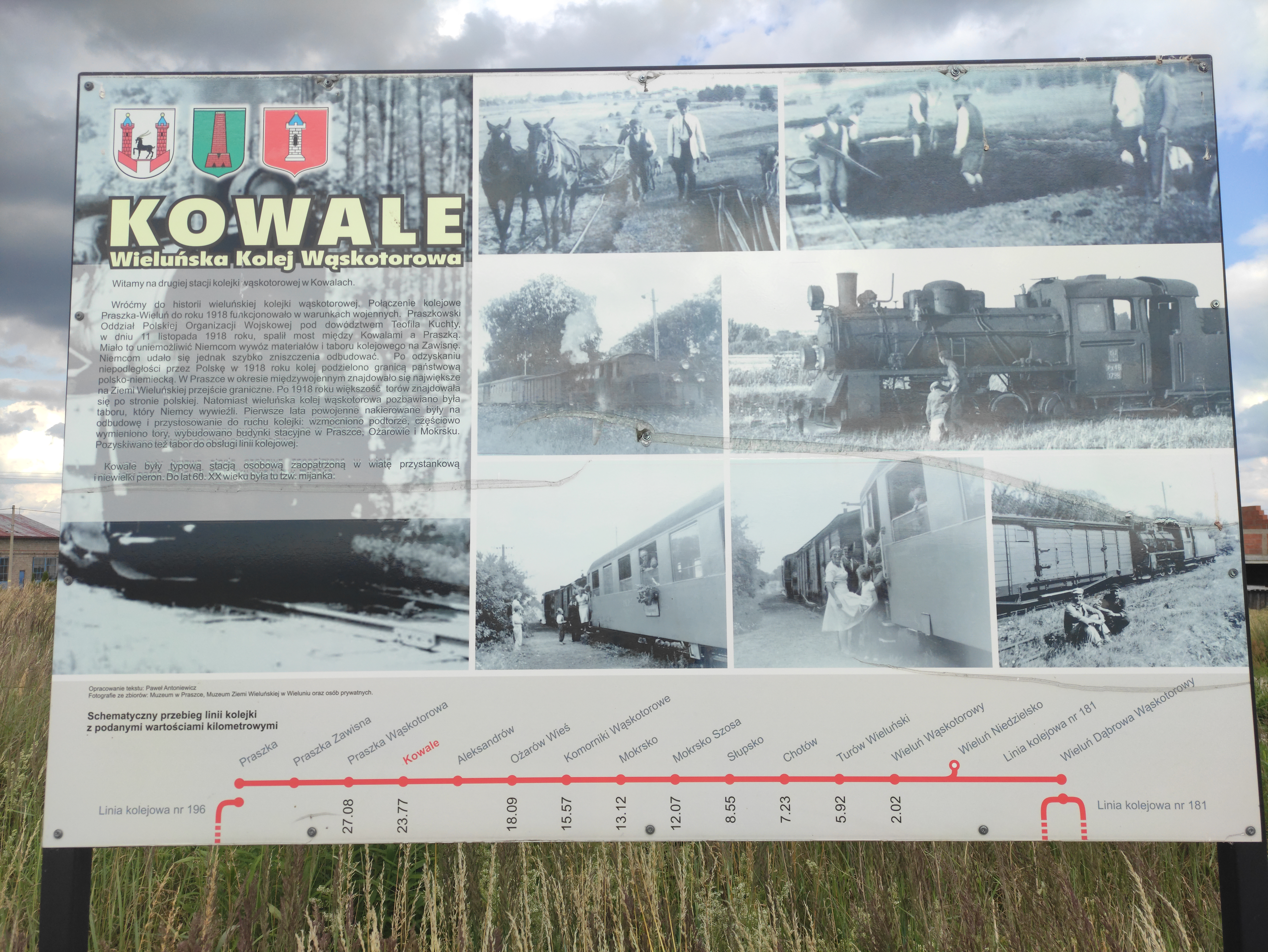

- Location within Poland
- Coordinates: 51°5′N 18°29′E
- Country: Poland
- Voivodeship: Opole
- County: Olesno
- Gmina: Praszka

Kowale [kɔˈvalɛ] is a village in the administrative district of Gmina Praszka, within Olesno County, Opole Voivodeship, in south-western Poland.
