= Battle of Praszka =

The Battle of Praszka, one of many skirmishes of the January Uprising, took place on 11 April 1863 near Praszka in southwestern corner of Russian-controlled Congress Poland. Polish forces under Jozef Oxinski clashed with troops (mostly Cossacks) of the Imperial Russian Army, commanded by Mayor Yakov Ogalin.

== The battle ==
In early April 1863, Oxinski's unit stationed for a while at a folwark in the village of Kuzniczka, one kilometer from Praszka. Polish insurgents were closely watched by the Russians, and Oxinski was well aware of it, so he decided to march northeast, closer to the Prussian border, to spend Easter there. An insurgent patrol, sent out on 11 April, spotted a group of Cossacks, stationed in the village of Strojec. As turned out later, it was a trap, as a large Russian force was hidden in a forest. Oxinski, who at some point sensed the danger, decided to break through Russian lines in their weakest point, and flee to Wielun.

The battle took place in a dense forest, and Polish insurgents used bayonets. Using the element of surprise, Oxinski and his men managed to escape encirclement. Poles lost 10 men, while Russian losses amounted to 28 killed. A few days after the skirmish, bodies of 9 unnamed Poles were buried in a mass grave in Praszka. A monument in their memory was later unveiled at the cemetery.

== Sources ==
- Stefan Kieniewicz: Powstanie styczniowe. Warszawa: Państwowe Wydawnictwo Naukowe, 1983. ISBN 83-01-03652-4.
