= Tokary, Opole Voivodeship =

Tokary
- Village
- Location within Poland
- Coordinates: 51°2′N 18°32′E
- Country: Poland
- Voivodeship: Opole
- County: Olesno
- Gmina: Praszka
- Time zone: UTC+1 (CET)
  - Summer (DST): UTC+2 (CEST)

Tokary [tɔˈkarɨ] is a village in the administrative district of Gmina Praszka, within Olesno County, Opole Voivodeship, in southern Poland.
