= Gmina Praszka =

Gmina Praszka Praszka Commune
- Gmina
- Coat of arms
- Interactive map of Gmina Praszka
- Coordinates (Praszka): 51°3′N 18°27′E
- Country: Poland
- Voivodeship: Opole
- County: Olesno
- Seat: Praszka

Area
  - Total: 102.8 km^{2} (39.7 sq mi)

Population (2019-06-30)
  - Total: 13,537
  - Density: 131.7/km^{2} (341.1/sq mi)
  - Urban: 7,655
  - Rural: 5,882
- Time zone: UTC+1 (CET)
  - Summer (DST): UTC+2 (CEST)
- Vehicle registration: OOL
- Website: http://praszka.pl

Gmina Praszka is an urban-rural gmina (administrative district) in Olesno County, Opole Voivodeship, in southern Poland. Its seat is the town of Praszka, which lies approximately 20 kilometres (12 mi) north of Olesno and 56 km (35 mi) north-east of the regional capital Opole.

The gmina covers an area of 102.8 square kilometres (39.7 sq mi), and as of 2019 its total population is 13,537.

== Villages ==
Apart from the town of Praszka, Gmina Praszka contains the villages and settlements of Aleksandrów, Brzeziny, Gana, Kowale, Kozieł, Kuźniczka, Lachowskie, Marki, Prosna, Przedmość, Rosochy, Rozterk, Skotnica, Sołtysy, Strojec, Szyszków, Tokary, Wierzbie and Wygiełdów.

== Neighbouring gminas ==
Gmina Praszka is bordered by the gminas of Gorzów Śląski, Mokrsko, Pątnów, Radłów, Rudniki and Skomlin.

== Twin towns – sister cities ==
Gmina Praszka is twinned with:

- Bohorodchany, Ukraine
- Mutterstadt, Germany
