= Strojec, Opole Voivodeship =

Strojec
- Village
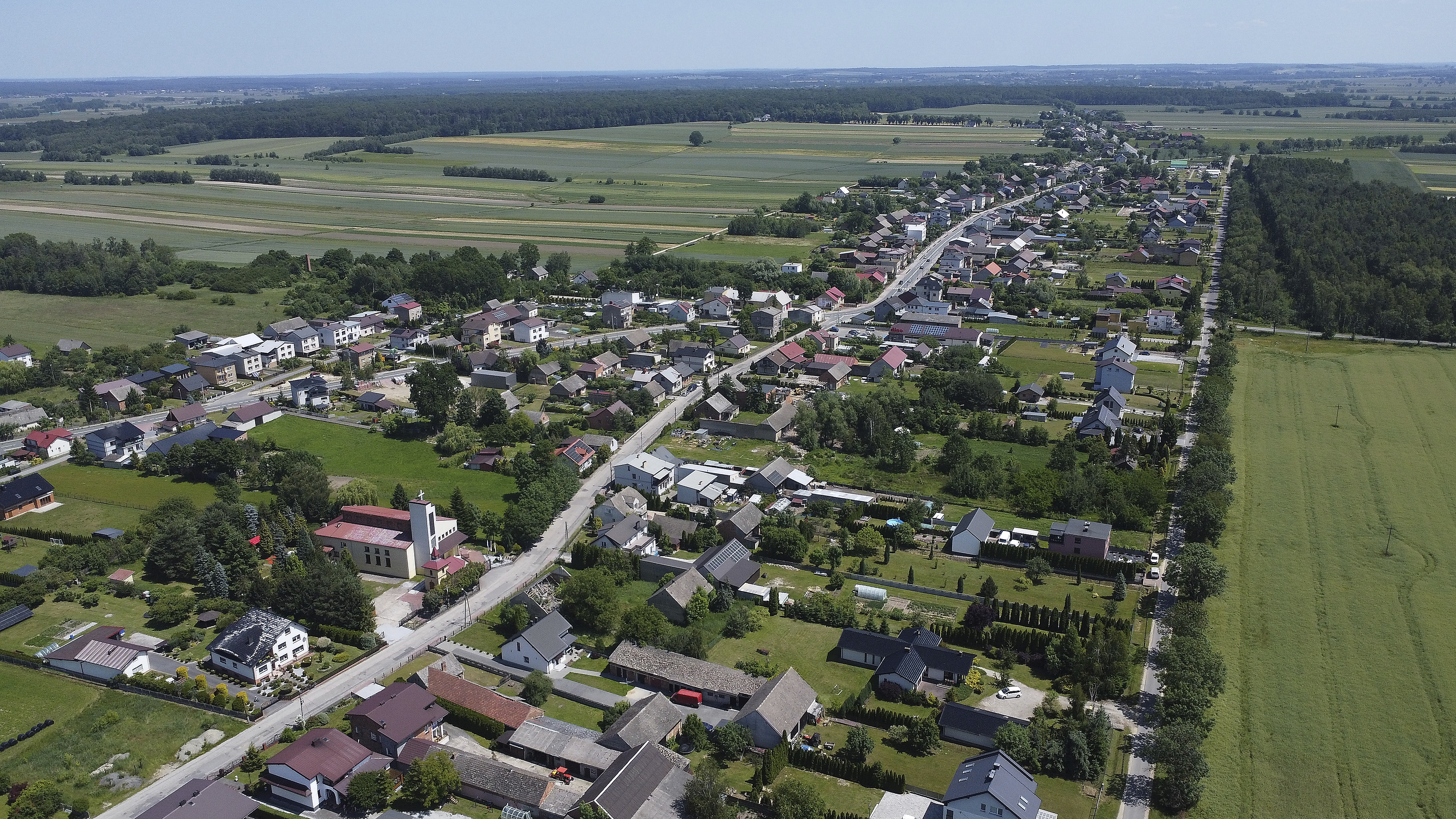

- Location within Poland
- Coordinates: 51°2′15″N 18°30′3″E
- Country: Poland
- Voivodeship: Opole
- County: Olesno
- Gmina: Praszka
- Population (approx.): 1,100
- Website: http://www.strojec.pl

Strojec [ˈstrɔjɛt͡s] is a village in the administrative district of Gmina Praszka, within Olesno County, Opole Voivodeship, in south-western Poland.
