= Aleksandrów, Opole Voivodeship =

Aleksandrów
- Village
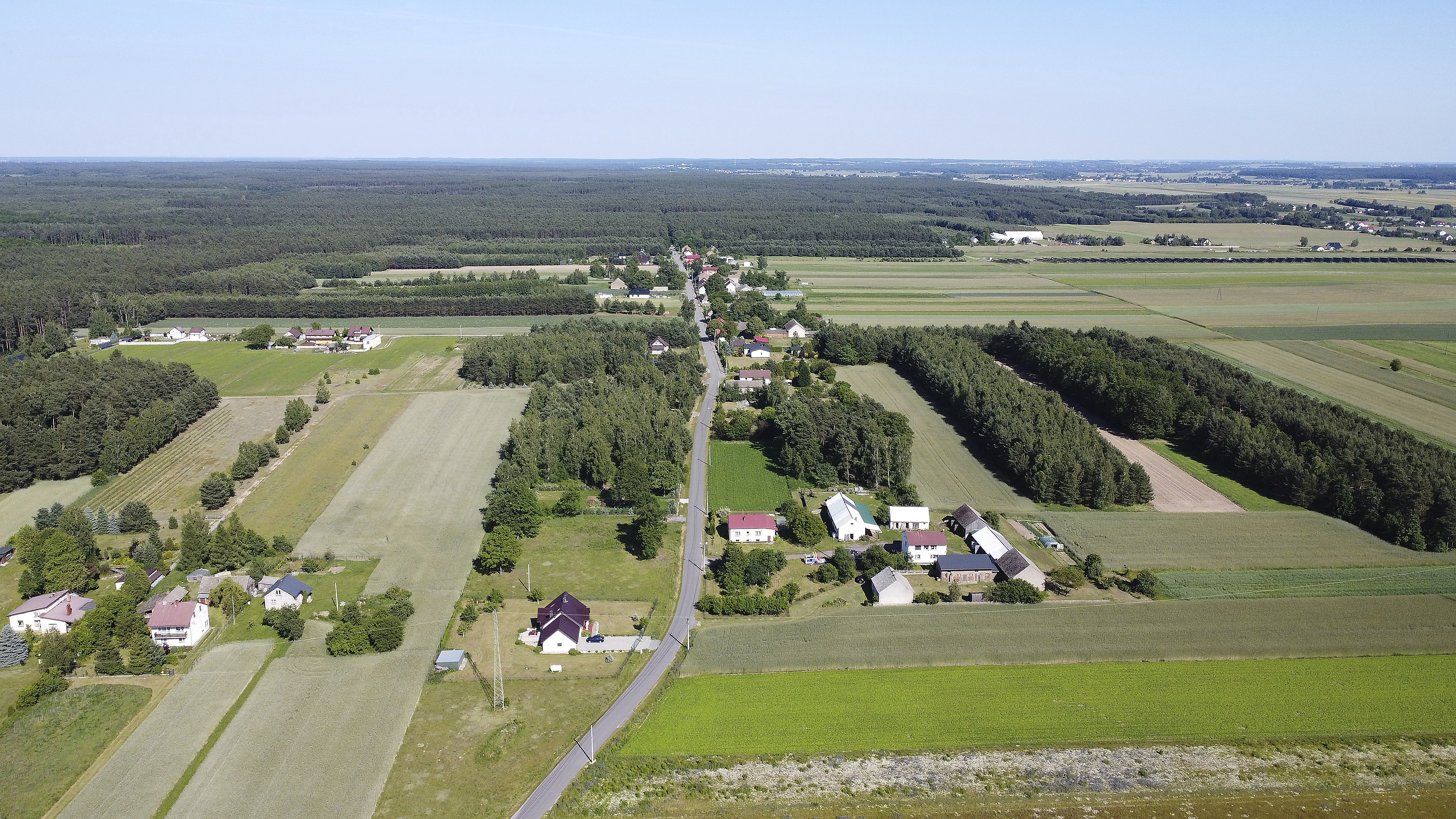

- Location within Poland
- Coordinates: 51°6′N 18°29′E
- Country: Poland
- Voivodeship: Opole
- County: Olesno
- Gmina: Praszka
- Time zone: UTC+1 (CET)
  - Summer (DST): UTC+2 (CEST)
- Postal code: 46-320
- Vehicle registration: OOL

Aleksandrów [alɛkˈsandruf] is a village in the administrative district of Gmina Praszka, within Olesno County, Opole Voivodeship, south-western Poland.

According to the 1921 census, the village had a population of 157, entirely Polish by nationality and Roman Catholic by confession.
