= Wierzbie, Olesno County =

Wierzbie
- Village
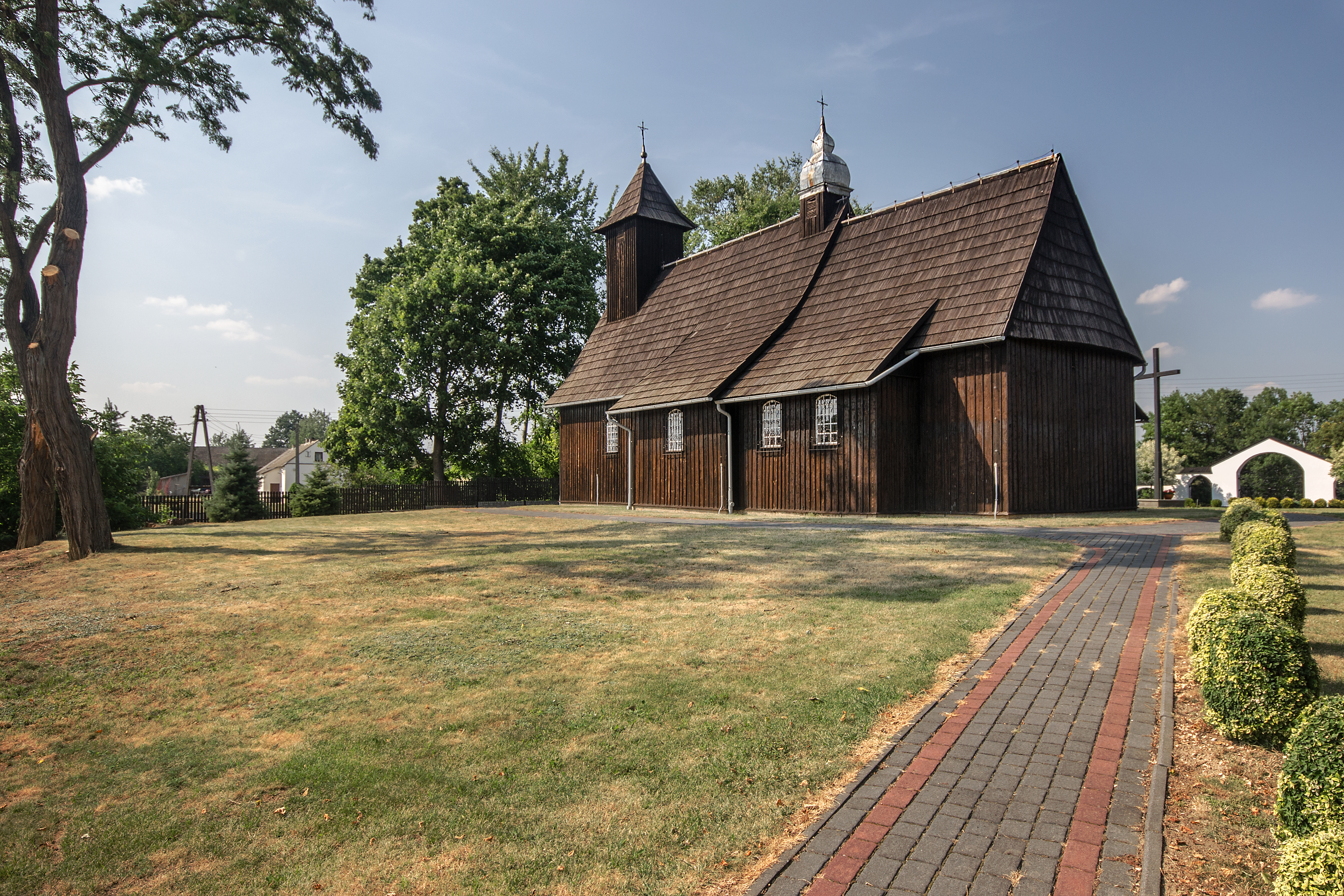
- Church of St. Leonard in Wierzbie

- Location within Poland
- Coordinates: 51°07′35″N 18°32′15″E
- Country: Poland
- Voivodeship: Opole
- County: Olesno
- Gmina: Praszka
- Time zone: UTC+1 (CET)
  - Summer (DST): UTC+2 (CEST)
- Postal code: 46-320
- Vehicle registration: OOL

Wierzbie [ˈvjɛʐbjɛ] is a village in the administrative district of Gmina Praszka, within Olesno County, Opole Voivodeship, in southern Poland.

According to the 1921 census, the village with the adjacent manor farm had a population of 916, 99.0% Polish and 1.0% Jewish.
