= Przedmość =

- Village
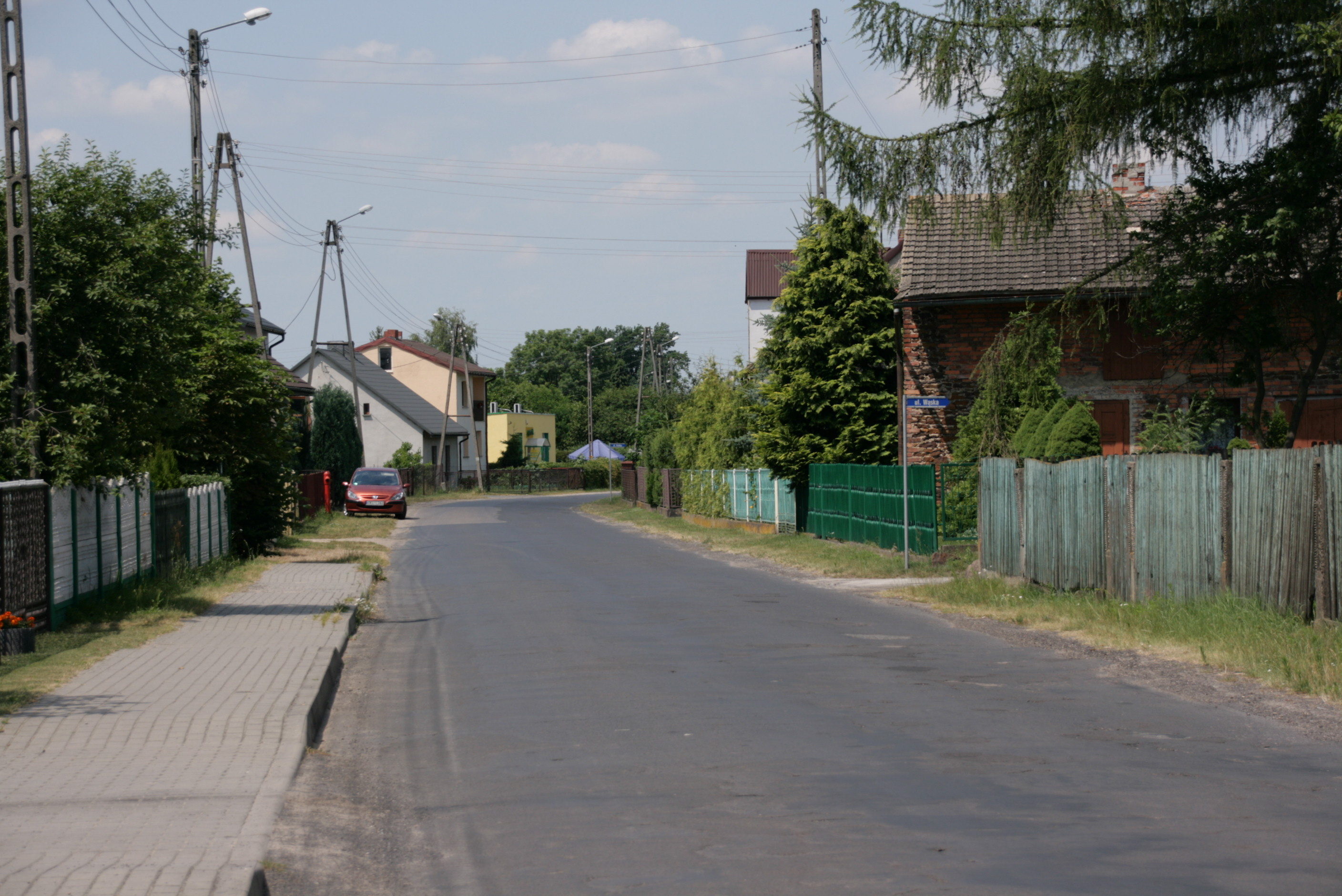

- Location within Poland
- Coordinates: 51°6′N 18°26′E
- Country: Poland
- Voivodeship: Opole
- County: Olesno
- Gmina: Praszka
- Population (approx.): 650

Przedmość [ˈpʂɛdmɔɕt͡ɕ] is a village in the administrative district of Gmina Praszka, within Olesno County, Opole Voivodeship, in south-western Poland.
