= Praszka =

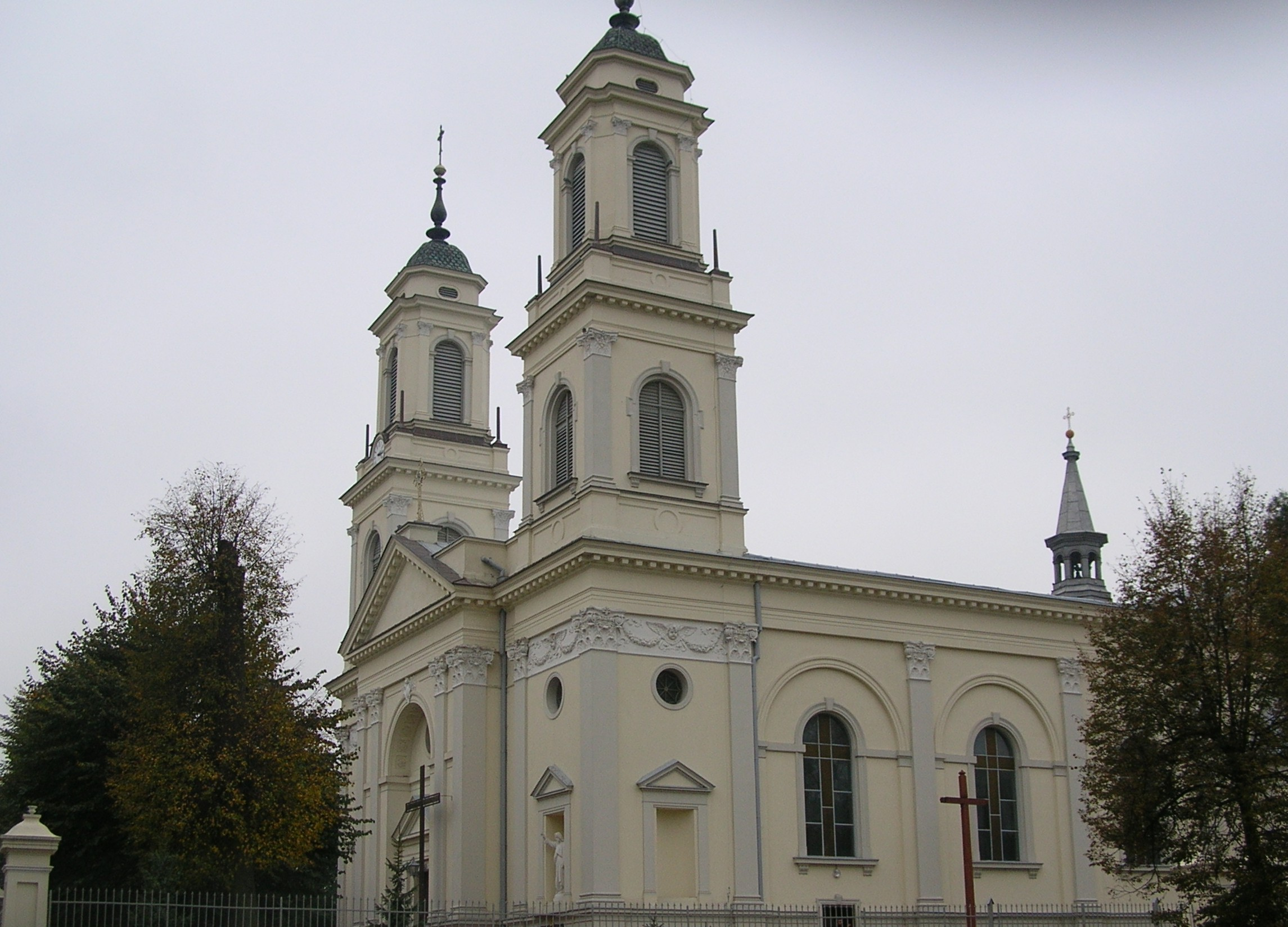
- Church of the Assumption in Praszka

- Flag Coat of arms

- Location within Poland
- Coordinates: 51°3′N 18°27′E
- Country: Poland
- Voivodeship: Opole
- County: Olesno
- Gmina: Praszka
- First mentioned: 1260
- Town rights: 1392

Government
  - Mayor: Mateusz Konwerski

Area
  - Total: 9.45 km^{2} (3.65 sq mi)

Population (2019-06-30)
  - Total: 7,655
  - Density: 810/km^{2} (2,100/sq mi)
- Time zone: UTC+1 (CET)
  - Summer (DST): UTC+2 (CEST)
- Postal code: 46-320
- Area code: +48 34
- Car plates: OOL
- Website: http://praszka.pl

Praszka ([ˈpraʂka]) is a town in Olesno County, Opole Voivodeship, in southern Poland, with 7,655 inhabitants (2019).

== History ==
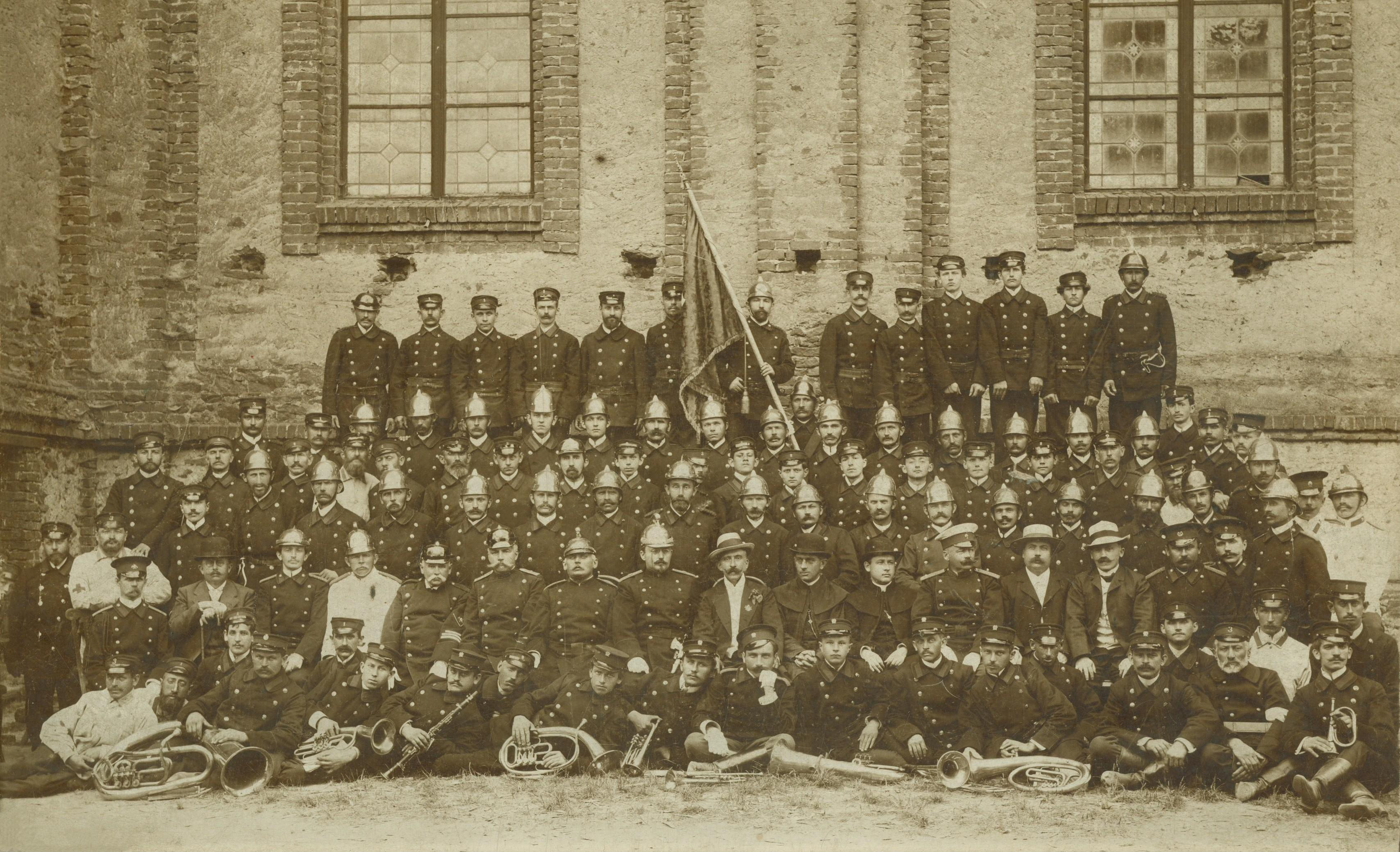
19th-century volunteer fire department in Praszka

The oldest known mention of the settlement dates back to 1260. It was granted town rights in 1392 by Polish King Władysław II Jagiełło and new privileges in 1542 and 1620. It was annexed by Prussia in the Second Partition of Poland in 1793. In 1807 regained by the Poles as part of the short-lived Duchy of Warsaw, in 1815 it became part of Congress Poland, later forcibly integrated with Imperial Russia. During the January Uprising weapons for Polish insurgents were smuggled through the town and on April 11, 1863, a Polish unit commanded by Józef Oxiński fought the Battle of Praszka against the Russians nearby. As part of Russian reprisals after the uprising, Praszka was stripped of its town rights in 1870. During World War I the town was occupied by Germany. It became again part of Poland after the county regained its independence in 1918, and town rights were restored in 1919. According to the 1921 census, the town had a population of 4,478, 65.8% Polish and 34.0% Jewish.

During the German–Soviet invasion of Poland, which started World War II, in September 1939, it was invaded by Germany, and the Einsatzgruppe II entered the town to commit various atrocities against the populace. The Germans robbed, conscripted labor, forced into a ghetto, and then murdered almost all of the town's Jewish population. Most were deported to the Chełmno extermination camp where they were immediately gassed. Others were murdered in the town or at the Jewish cemetery. Only about 10 of Plaszka's pre-war Jewish population of around 1000 is thought to have survived the war. In 1943, the Germans expelled 252 Poles and deported them to forced labour to Germany. The local Polish police chief was murdered by the Russians in the Katyn massacre in 1940. More than 30% of the town's population died. The German occupation ended in 1945.

== Culture ==
There is a museum in Praszka, dedicated to the history of the town and its surroundings.

== Sports ==
The local football team is Motor Praszka. It competes in the lower leagues.

== Notable people ==
- Daniel Neufeld (1814–1874), Jewish Polish poet
- Franciszek Maryański (1869–1933), politician, activist, member of the Sejm (Polish parliament)
- Stefan Korboński (1901–1989), politician, lawyer, journalist, member of the Polish resistance movement in World War II

== Twin towns – sister cities ==
See twin towns of Gmina Praszka.
