= Aleksander Koj =

Polish biochemist (1935–2016)

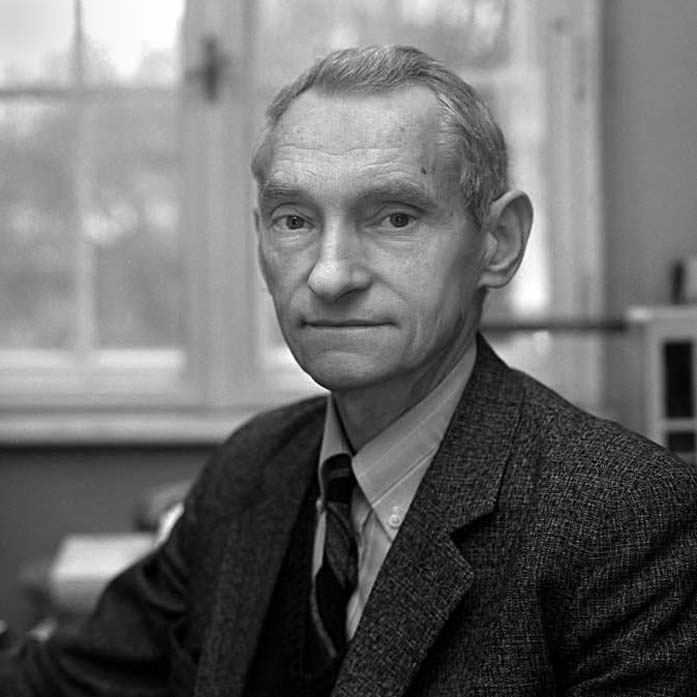
- Born: 26 February 1935; Gana, Poland
- Died: 29 December 2016 (aged 81)
- Citizenship: Polish
- Education: Jagiellonian University
- Occupations: physician biochemist
- Known for: research on immunology, zymology and molecular biology

Aleksander Koj (Polish pronunciation: [alɛˈksandɛr ˈkɔj]; 26 February 1935 – 29 December 2016) was a Polish physician and scientist, a member of Polish Academy of Learning and Polish Academy of Sciences, honorary doctor of Cleveland University and University of Hartford.

He was a rector of Jagiellonian University for three cadences: 1987–1990, 1993–1996 and 1996–1999.

In his scientific work he is known for researches in the field of immunology, zymology and molecular biology. In 1996 he received Prize of the Foundation for Polish Science for his researches on acute-phase protein.

In 1976 he was decorated with a Knight's Cross, in 1999 with an Officer's Cross, and in 2011 with a Commander's Cross of Polonia Restituta.
