= Szyszków, Opole Voivodeship =

Szyszków
- Village
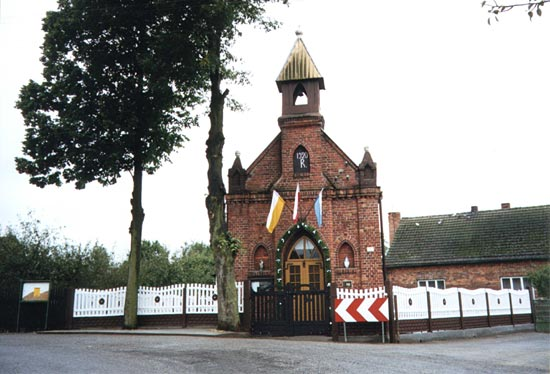
- Chapel

- Location within Poland
- Coordinates: 51°2′N 18°26′E
- Country: Poland
- Voivodeship: Opole
- County: Olesno
- Gmina: Praszka

Szyszków [ˈʂɨʂkuf] is a village in the administrative district of Gmina Praszka, within Olesno County, Opole Voivodeship, in south-western Poland.
