= Rozterk =

- Village
- Location within Poland
- Coordinates: 51°03′34″N 18°29′06″E
- Country: Poland
- Voivodeship: Opole
- County: Olesno
- Gmina: Praszka

Population
  - Total: 270
- Time zone: UTC+1 (CET)
  - Summer (DST): UTC+2 (CEST)
- Postal code: 46-320
- Vehicle registration: OOL

Rozterk [ˈrɔstɛrk] is a village in the administrative district of Gmina Praszka, within Olesno County, Opole Voivodeship, in southern Poland.

According to the 1921 census, the village had a population of 34, entirely Polish by nationality and Roman Catholic by confession.
