= Gana, Poland =

Gana
- Village
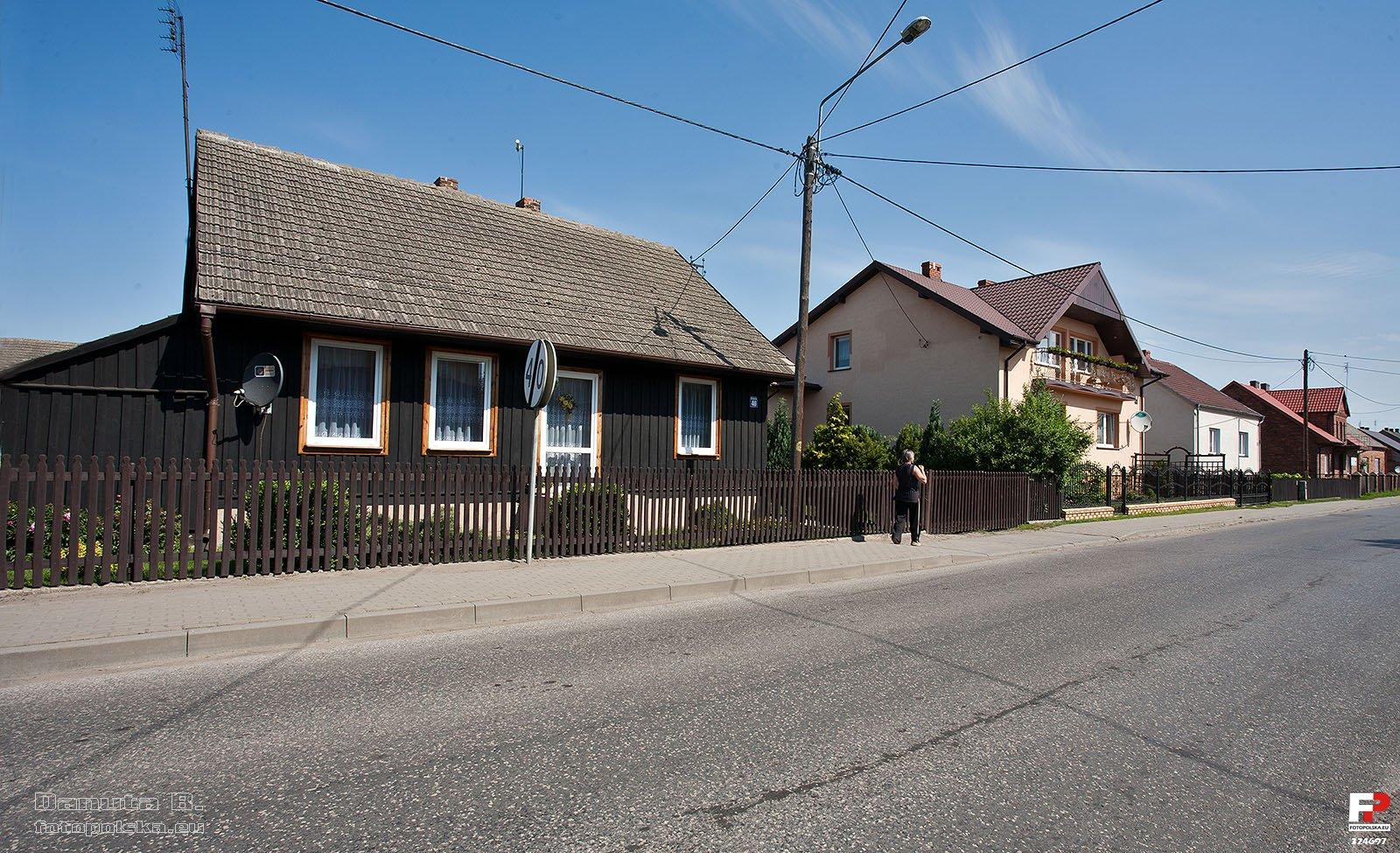

- Location within Poland
- Coordinates: 51°4′10″N 18°31′51″E
- Country: Poland
- Voivodeship: Opole
- County: Olesno
- Gmina: Praszka

Population (approx.)
  - Total: 300
- Time zone: UTC+1 (CET)
  - Summer (DST): UTC+2 (CEST)
- Postal code: 46-320
- Vehicle registration: OOL

Gana [ˈɡana] is a village in the administrative district of Gmina Praszka, within Olesno County, Opole Voivodeship, in southern Poland.

== History ==
According to the 1921 census, the village had a population of 757, entirely Polish by nationality and Roman Catholic by confession.

During World War II, the local school principal was murdered by the Russians in the Katyn massacre in 1940.
