= Kozieł =

- Village
- Location within Poland
- Coordinates: 51°05′51″N 18°27′51″E
- Country: Poland
- Voivodeship: Opole
- County: Olesno
- Gmina: Praszka

Kozieł [ˈkɔʑɛu̯] is a village in the administrative district of Gmina Praszka, within Olesno County, Opole Voivodeship, in south-western Poland.
